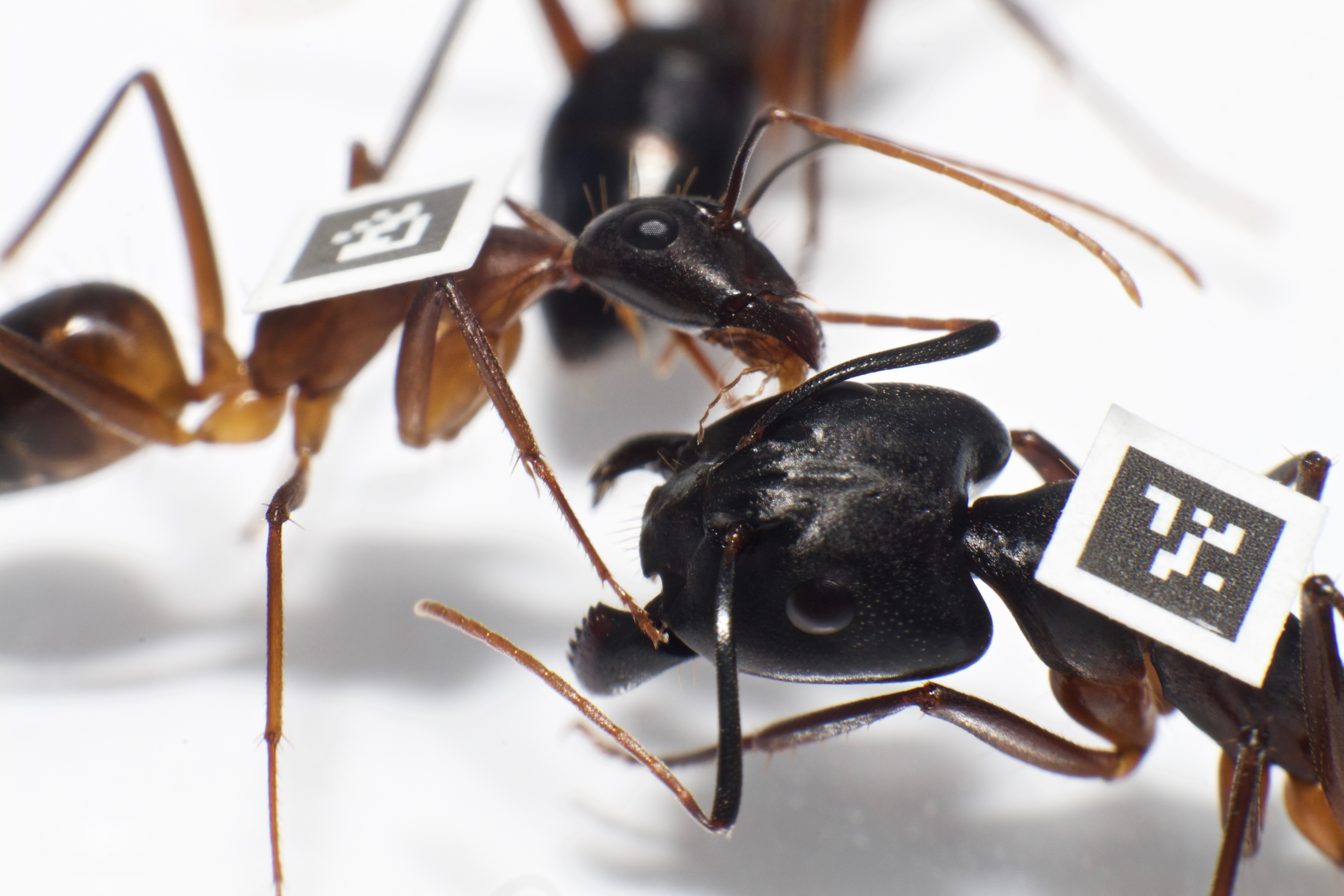
- Camponotus fellah workers (a major and a minor) tagged with fiducial markers

Scientific classification
- Kingdom: Animalia
- Phylum: Arthropoda
- Clade: Pancrustacea
- Class: Insecta
- Order: Hymenoptera
- Family: Formicidae
- Subfamily: Formicinae
- Genus: Camponotus
- Species: C. fellah

Binomial name
- Camponotus fellah Dalla Torre, 1893

Synonyms
- Camponotus oasium var. fellah Dalla Torre, 1893

= Camponotus fellah =

Species of carpenter ant

Camponotus fellah is a species of carpenter ant found across the Middle East and North Africa. This species was named as a variety of Camponotus maculatus race oasium by Emery in 1891, as cited by Dalla Torre in 1893. A C. fellah queen holds the record for Israeli ant longevity, surviving for 26 years (1983–2009) in a laboratory environment.

== Basic biology ==
Camponotus fellah is monogynous (i.e., colonies consist of a single queen), with polymorphic workers. Queens are singly inseminated meaning that all workers in a colony are full sisters. Colonies are generally found in dry and warm habitats including coastal dunes and deserts.

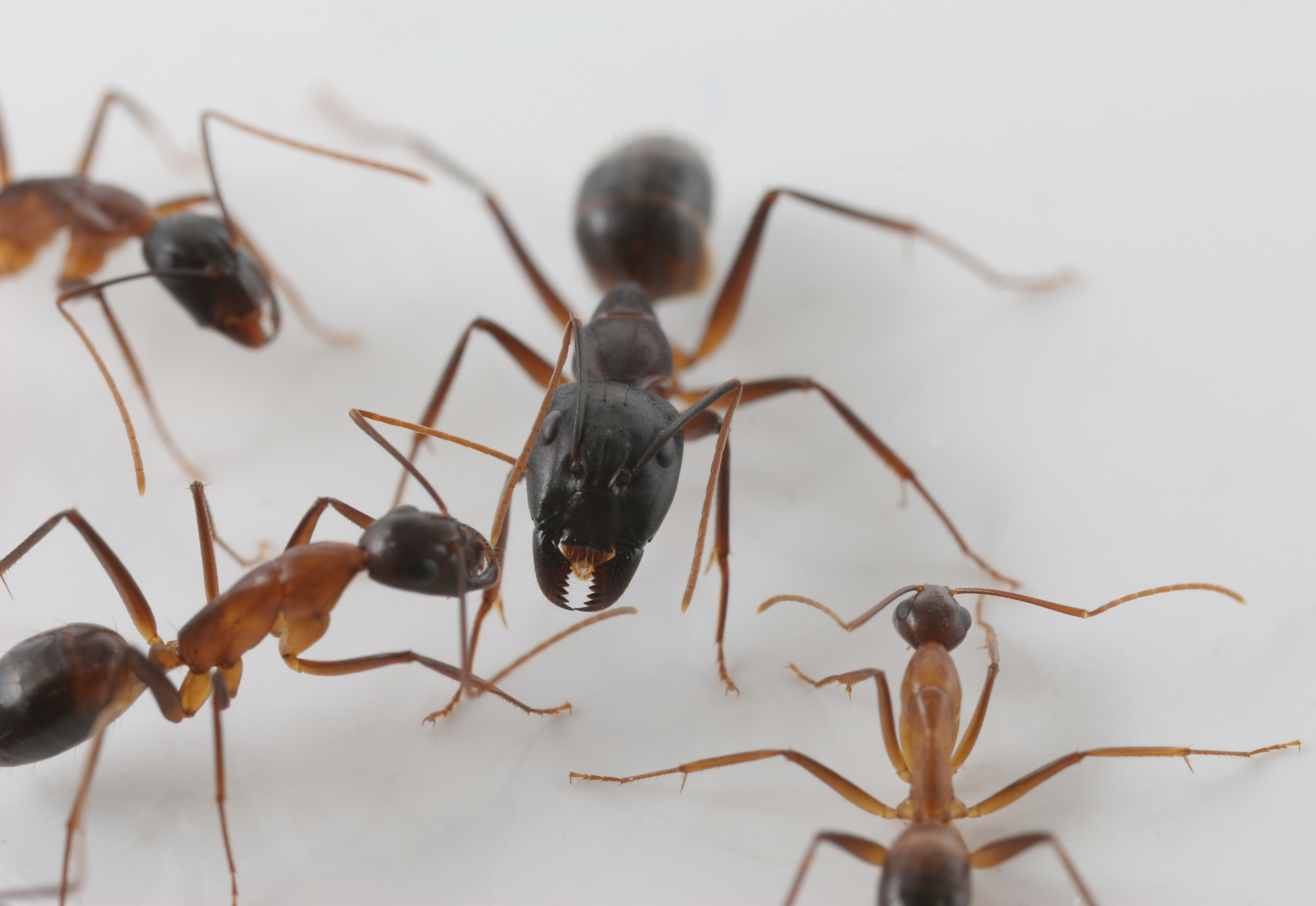
C. fellah workers are polymorphic (i.e., they vary markedly in size)

== Nestmate recognition ==
Ant nest-mate recognition is mediated by low volatile cuticular hydrocarbons. Isolated workers are unable to frequently exchange hydrocarbons with nest-mates, and their hydrocarbon profiles diverge from that of the colony. After 20–40 days in isolation, the hydrocarbon profiles of workers diverges to such an extent that they are no longer accepted by the colony. However, aggression is reduced if the isolated workers are exposed to airflow from the colony, indicating that volatile nest chemicals also contribute to nest-mate recognition.

== The role of trophallaxis ==
Trophallaxis – the mouth-to-mouth transfer of liquid food – is a main mechanism of food dissemination in ant colonies. In C. fellah, the colony trophallactic network has been quantified by combining unique marking of individuals with fluorescently labelled food. This procedure refined our understanding of trophallaxis, revealing that transfer flow can switch direction during a trophallaxis event, that foragers receive (as well as unload) food, that foragers often leave the nest after offloading only a small amount of the food in their crop, and that non-foragers also offload considerable amounts of food. Further, the vast majority of trophallaxis events were short in duration, possibly functioning to maintain the colony odour rather than disseminate food. Indeed, when the hydrocarbon profiles of members of C. fellah colonies are artificially modified, the colony reaches homogeneity more rapidly than non-trophallaxing species. Through maintaining homogenous hydrocarbon profiles, trophallaxis mediates colony cohesion. The engagement of workers in socially cohesive trophallaxis may be underpinned by levels of octopamine in the brain. Usually after isolation, upon return to the colony, workers perform trophallaxis at an elevated rate. However, if workers are treated with octopamine, this increase in trophallaxis is not observed.

== Social structure ==
A combination of automated behavioural tracking and social network analysis revealed that colony social networks comprise two communities: a nurse community of the queen and young workers who care for the brood, and a forager community of older workers who leave the nest to forage. This structure is thought to emerge from age-associated changes in the behaviour of individual workers.

== Effects of social isolation ==
Socially isolated workers rapidly lose weight, and exhibit reduced lifespans and behavioural changes including increased locomotion. This effect is markedly reduced when workers are isolated with just one other individual. The increase in the mortality of isolated workers likely results from an increase in energy expenditure and a decrease in energy income. Through energy balance, social interactions therefore seem to influence health and ageing.

== Microbiota ==
Camponotus fellah, like all tested carpenter ant species, harbours an intracellular endosymbiotic bacteria from the genus Blochmannia. This endosymbiont contributes to host nutrition by recycling nitrogen into aminoacid biosynthesis, and when levels are experimentally reduced colony growth decreases. Blochmannia is harboured in specialised cells (bacteriocytes) in the midgut epithelium, and transmitted exclusively horizontally.

Since Blochmannia's closest sister taxa are endosymbionts of sap-feeding insects, and ants often associate with sap-feeding insects, it is possible that the Blochmannia ancestor was acquired by the Camponotini ancestor via sap-feeding insects.

== Learning and memory ==
In general ants rely heavily on olfactory cues and have well-developed olfactory centres in their brains. This is particularly true of carpenter ants, and C. fellah workers can be trained to associate odours with gustatory reinforcers in lab conditions. They will choose the branch of a Y-maze according to odours they have learnt to associate with gustatory reward.

== Navigation ==
Foraging above ground the workers rely heavily on vision for navigation. Below ground, workers combine spatial memory, chemical signals, and gravity. When faced with catastrophe, the workers dynamically adjust which of these sources of information they rely on through individual and collective learning.
