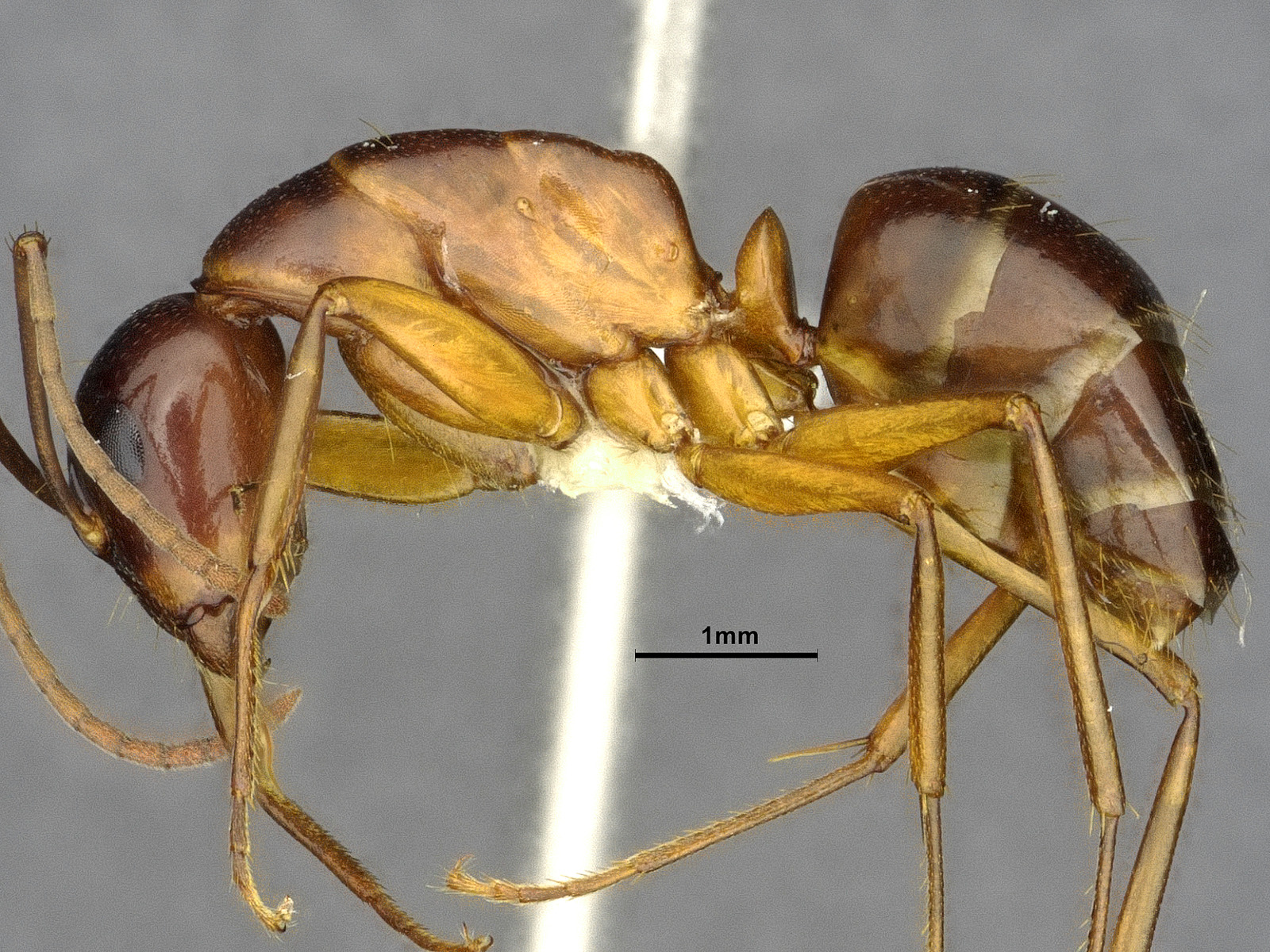
- A worker specimen from AntWeb

Scientific classification
- Kingdom: Animalia
- Phylum: Arthropoda
- Clade: Pancrustacea
- Class: Insecta
- Order: Hymenoptera
- Family: Formicidae
- Subfamily: Formicinae
- Tribe: Camponotini
- Genus: Retalimyrma
- Species: R. wroughtonii

Binomial name
- Retalimyrma wroughtonii (Forel, 1893)

= Retalimyrma =

Genus of ant

Retalimyrma is a monotypic genus of ants in the subfamily Formicinae, consisting of the sole species Retalimyrma wroughtonii, native to the Himalayas of Nepal and India. R. wroughtonii was previously placed in the genus Camponotus as Camponotus wroughtonii, although it was separated in 2025 into its own genus based on ultraconserved element phylogenomic analysis. Its scientific name means "remnant ant" from Ancient Greek retáli (ῥετάλι, "remnant") + myrma (μύρμα, "ant").

== Taxonomy ==
The species was originally described as Camponotus (Camponotus) Wroughtonii by Auguste Forel in 1893, based on syntype workers and males collected by Smythies in the Himalayas at 9,000 feet. Bingham (1903) provided descriptions of the major worker and queen. The species was subsequently placed in the subgenus Myrmentoma by Emery (1920, 1925). A syntype worker (CASENT0910427) in the Muséum d'histoire naturelle de Genève was designated as the lectotype by Ward et al. (2025). The species is named after Robert Charles Wroughton (1849–1921), a British naturalist and Inspector General of Forests in India who collected numerous ant specimens and sent them to Forel for study.

Phylogenomic analysis using ultraconserved elements by Ward et al. (2025) revealed that Camponotus wroughtonii could not be placed in any existing genus and represented an isolated lineage within the tribe Camponotini. Along with two other novel genera, Lathidris from Mesoamerica and Uwari from eastern Asia, it was erected as a new monotypic genus.

== Biology ==
Like all members of the tribe Camponotini, Retalimyrma wroughtonii harbours the obligate bacterial endosymbiont Blochmannia, which provides nutritional benefits to its host.

A nest of R. wroughtonii was found in Nepal at 2,550 metres elevation in open pine–cypress forest (Pinus excelsa, Cupressus torulosa) on the west side of the Kali Gandaki River. The nest, located under several adjacent small stones, contained workers, larvae, and cocoons; no queen or major workers were found.

== Distribution ==
Retalimyrma wroughtonii occurs in the Indian Himalayas and Nepal. The presumptive type locality is Deoban (30.75° N, 77.85° E) in Uttarakhand, India. The species has been recorded from six locations in Nepal at elevations ranging from 900 to 4,000 metres. A historical literature record from Upper Burma (the Shan States at 4,000 feet) reported by Bingham (1903) requires verification.

== See also ==
- Camponotini
- Camponotus
