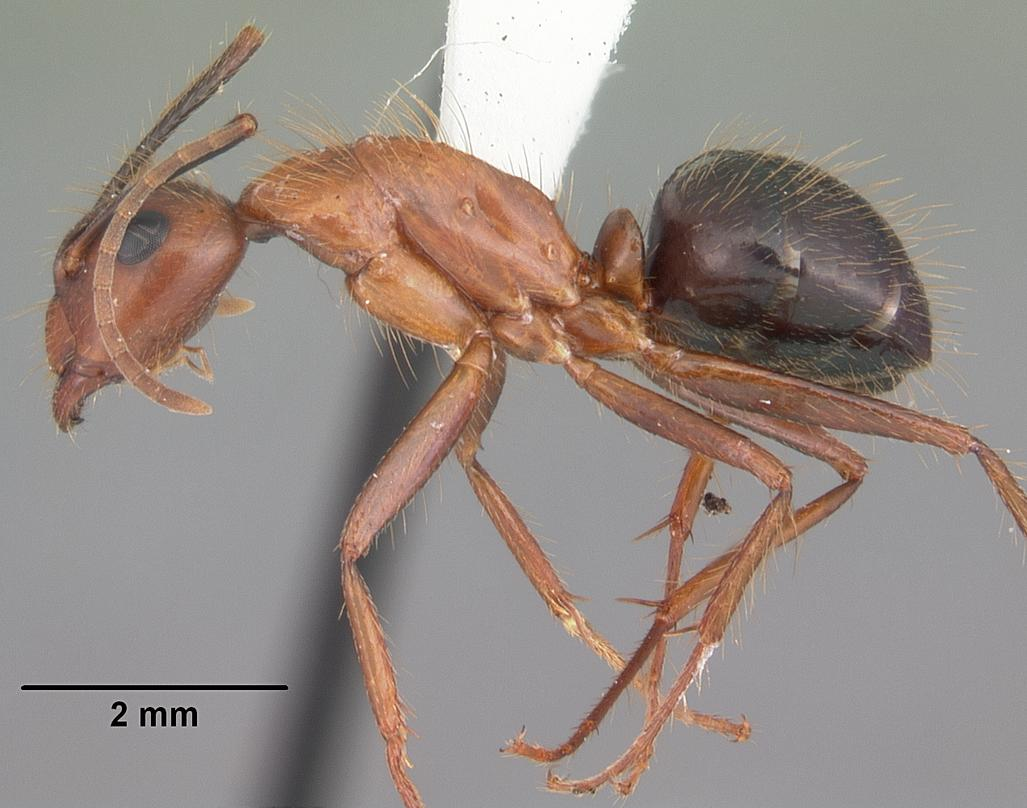
- Camponotus floridanus worker

Scientific classification
- Kingdom: Animalia
- Phylum: Arthropoda
- Clade: Pancrustacea
- Class: Insecta
- Order: Hymenoptera
- Family: Formicidae
- Subfamily: Formicinae
- Genus: Camponotus
- Subgenus: Myrmothrix
- Species: C. floridanus

Binomial name
- Camponotus floridanus (Buckley, 1866)

= Camponotus floridanus =

Species of ant known as the Florida carpenter ant

Camponotus floridanus, or Florida carpenter ant, is a species of ant in the genus Camponotus. First described as Formica floridana by Buckley in 1866, the species was moved to Camponotus by Mayr in 1886. The ant is widespread in Florida and occurs as far north as North Carolina and as far west as Mississippi.

== Description ==
Camponotus floridanus is one of the most familiar ant species in Florida owing both to its large size and conspicuous coloration. Workers and queens are bicolored, having a reddish-orange head and a bright to dullish orange colored mesosoma and legs, contrasted sharply by a deep black gaster. Male alates of this species are more concolorous, primarily ranging in the rusty to cider oranges. Camponotus floridanus can be distinguished from its visually similar, but smaller relative Camponotus tortuganus by its wider than long head, smaller but stockier legs relative to the body, and overall stouter build.

Queens on average vary 14–16 mm in length, and the highly polymorphic workers can potentially attain similar lengths, with the largest majors reaching 11–13 mm. Minors and mediae are typically around 4–9 mm.

== Distribution ==
Florida carpenter ants' native range is most highly concentrated throughout Florida, though it is also spread predominantly along the coastal areas northwards into Georgia and southern South Carolina, with minor reports as far north as Clayton, North Carolina. Their prominent range also spreads west along the Florida panhandle, through southern Alabama's Baldwin and Mobile Counties and into the very southeast of Mississippi. There have also been numerous reports of the species around Houston, Texas.

== Biology ==
=== Behavior ===
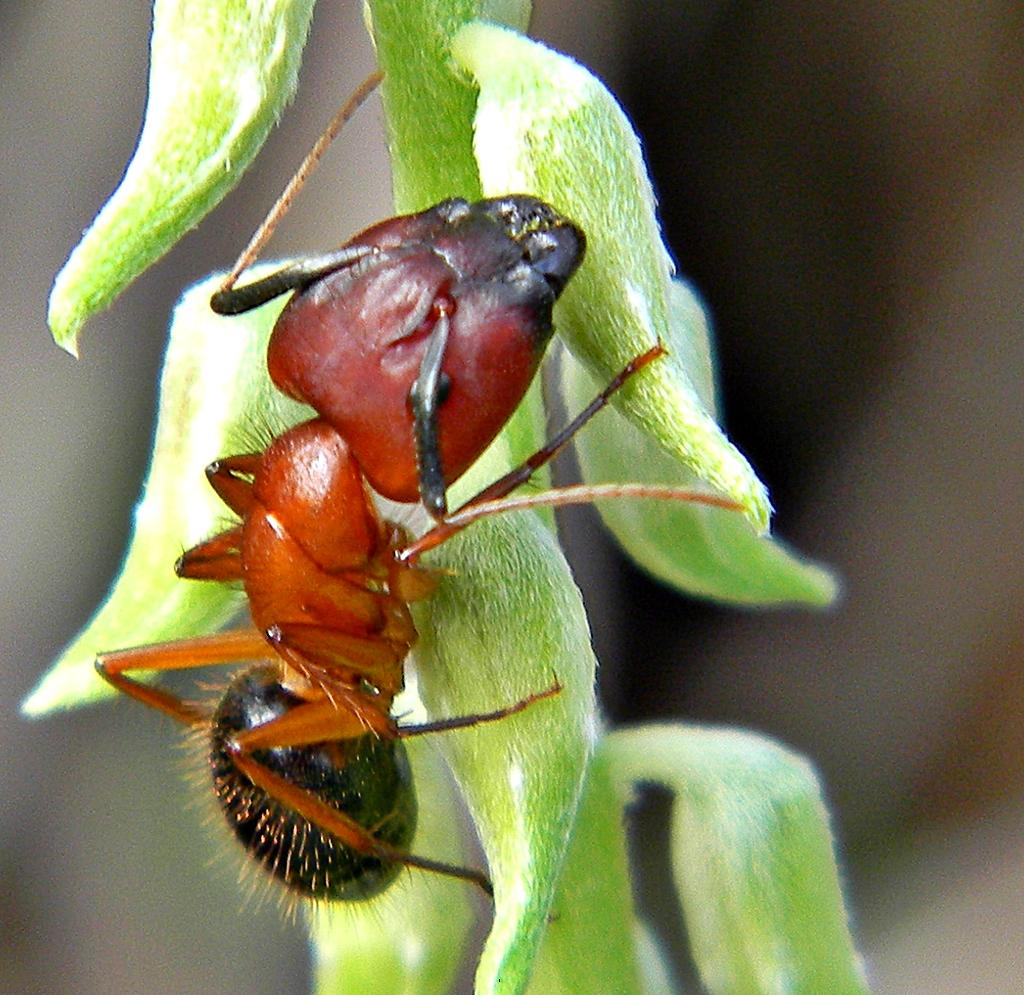
Major worker of the Florida carpenter ant

These ants are highly aggressive and fast moving, being quick to swarm any disturbance to their nest. Workers are relentless as they attack, searching meticulously for weaknesses in the skin and targeting vulnerable areas such as the skin creases or the nail cuticles. Major workers can deliver particularly devastating bites as their mandibles more readily pierce the skin, where bite wounds may draw blood and into which they will attempt to spray noxious formic acid. The unusual aggression of this Camponotus species may be an adaptation in response to its nesting habits, as they commonly inhabit extensively rotted deadwood that can easily be broken apart by hand.

Outside of deadwood, colonies may be found nesting underground within the base of a living tree or inside tree cavities. Even artificial structures such as hollow poles or fencing may be taken residence. Colonies prefer shaded areas in which to nest, such as in dense woodlands, though any area with many trees that provide adequate shade is potential suitable habitat. The Florida carpenter ant is readily tolerant of disturbed areas of human habitation, making them a common sight in the densely populated suburbs of Florida. In certain areas these ants can be quite populous and during mating flights the winged individuals numerous, leading to concerned property owners finding them on the walls of stores, buildings, and homes. These ants are not generally considered a threat to structures as they do not normally excavate into wood, unlike some wood-boring species of Camponotus, instead preferring existing cavities to nest in.

Camponotus floridanus primarily forages at night, though workers from larger colonies may be seen foraging during the day in areas with lots of shade. Different worker castes also perform different roles in the colony, with the smaller workers caring for the brood and queen, maintaining the nest and foraging for food. Major workers however only defend the nest and do not venture far, unless travelling to and from the numerous satellite nests the colony occupies. Northern populations undergo a diapause during the winter, while southernmost populations do not experience much dramatic and extensive diapause periods, if not at all, due to the warm tropical climate of South Florida. Compared to other members of its genus, C. floridanus is one of the most active and faster growing Camponotus species in North America.

=== Reproduction ===
Nuptial flights begin around May and peak in the summer months. Flights are triggered after heavy rains have raised the humidity of the air to 80-90% and temperatures around 80+°F are present half an hour after sunset. The female alates mate in the air once then ground themselves to search for a location to establish a new colony. The Florida carpenter ant is highly productive with colonies growing rapidly, reaching 1,000 workers within the first year and potentially exceeding 8,000 individuals in a mature colony 2–3 years later. Both male and female alates are attracted to bright white lights and can be found en masse around street, court, and field lights.

Queens are fully claustral and colonies are monogynous (contain one queen).

=== Diet and endosymbiosis ===
The Florida carpenter ant is omnivorous, taking arthropod food items as well as sweets, such as nectar or the sugary secretions produced by aphids in which they care for and defend. Like other Camponotus, they have their own species of symbiotic bacteria in the genus Blochmannia that inhabit bacteriocytes in their midgut to supplement their nitrogen-poor diets. These bacteria recycle waste products, such as urates from animal urine, into usable amino acids for the ants. The number of Blochmannia floridanus bacteria within the Florida carpenter ant's midgut increases significantly when the ant pupates, with the bacteria inhabiting cells other than bacteriocytes throughout the gut, suggesting they may also play a role in metamorphosis.

=== Wound-care amputations ===
Ecologists have discovered that Florida carpenter ants instinctively perform the behavior of amputation of nestmate's injured legs. The purpose of the amputation is to prevent pathogenic infections from spreading throughout the injured ant's body. Observation showed that leg amputations increased survival odds for ants with femur injuries, but not tibia injuries. Researchers reason that this is due to the fact that the spreading of pathogens throughout the body is slower for femur injuries than for distal tibia injuries. Further experimentation showed that ants are capable of differentiating between wound types, and adapt their wound-care treatment accordingly.

This proactive behavior of addressing potential pathogenic infections bears resemblance to other wound-care behavior such as the antimicrobial wound-licking behavior of nestmates observed in the megaponera ant species.

== Taxonomic status ==
Camponotus floridanus is closely related to Camponotus atriceps, and could be considered a subspecies of C. atriceps that diverged after becoming isolated within Florida. More phylogenetic and biochemical analysis is needed to determine the evolutionary history between C. floridanus and C. atriceps and in order ascertain the former's status as a separate species or a subspecies.
