= Metalasius myrmidon =

Scientific classification
- Kingdom: Animalia
- Phylum: Arthropoda
- Clade: Pancrustacea
- Class: Insecta
- Order: Hymenoptera
- Family: Formicidae
- Subfamily: Formicinae
- Genus: Metalasius
- Species: M. myrmidon

Binomial name
- Metalasius myrmidon (Mei, 1998)

Species of ant

Metalasius myrmidon is a species of ant in the subfamily Formicinae. It is found only in Greece.
