= Acrostigma =

Acrostigma may refer to:

- "Acrostigma" O.F.Cook & Doyle, synonym of the palm genus Wettinia
- "Acrostigma" Forel, 1902, synonym of the ant genus Stigmacros
