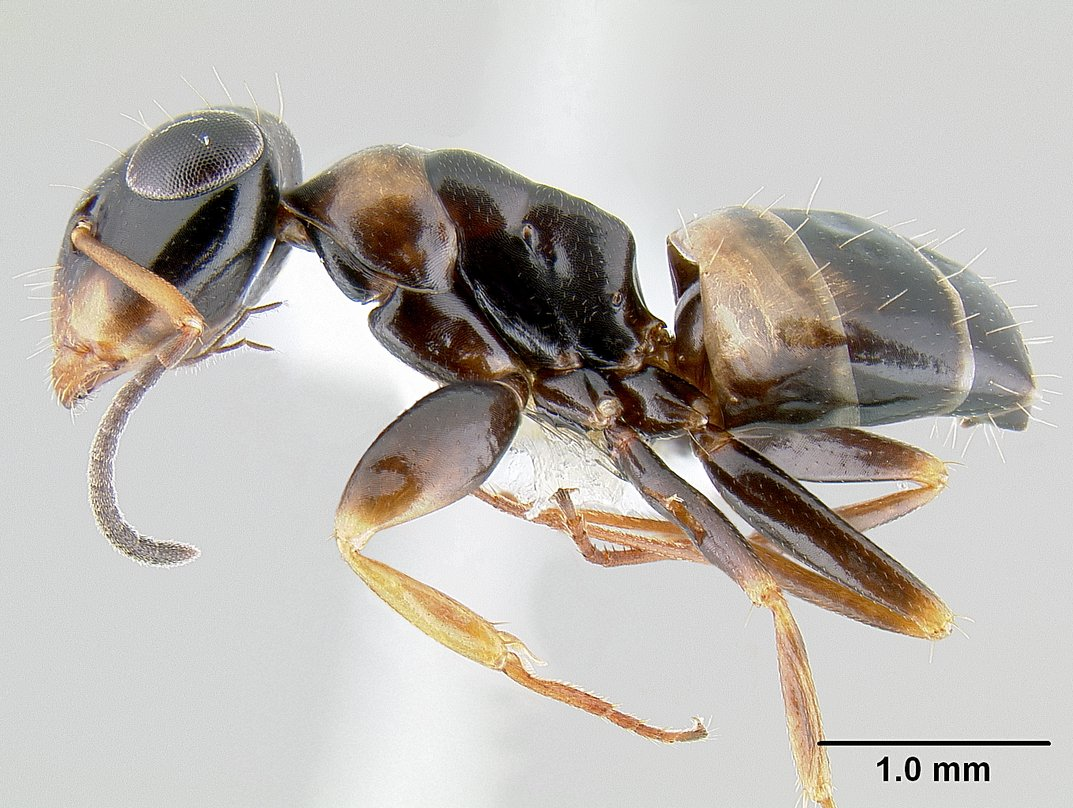
- Opisthopsis respiciens worker from Australia

Scientific classification
- Domain: Eukaryota
- Kingdom: Animalia
- Phylum: Arthropoda
- Class: Insecta
- Order: Hymenoptera
- Family: Formicidae
- Subfamily: Formicinae
- Tribe: Camponotini
- Genus: Opisthopsis; Dalla Torre, 1893

Diversity
- 13 species

Synonyms
- Myrmecopsis Smith, 1865

= Opisthopsis =

Genus of ants

Opisthopsis is a genus of ants in the subfamily Formicinae. Its 13 species are found in Australasia.

== Species ==
- Opisthopsis diadematus Wheeler, 1918
- Opisthopsis haddoni Emery, 1893
- Opisthopsis halmaherae Karavaiev, 1930
- Opisthopsis jocosus Wheeler, 1918
- Opisthopsis lienosus Wheeler, 1918
- Opisthopsis linnaei Forel, 1901
- Opisthopsis major Forel, 1902
- Opisthopsis manni Wheeler, 1918
- Opisthopsis maurus Wheeler, 1918
- Opisthopsis panops Bolton, 1995
- Opisthopsis pictus Emery, 1895
- Opisthopsis respiciens (Smith, 1865)
- Opisthopsis rufithorax Emery, 1895
