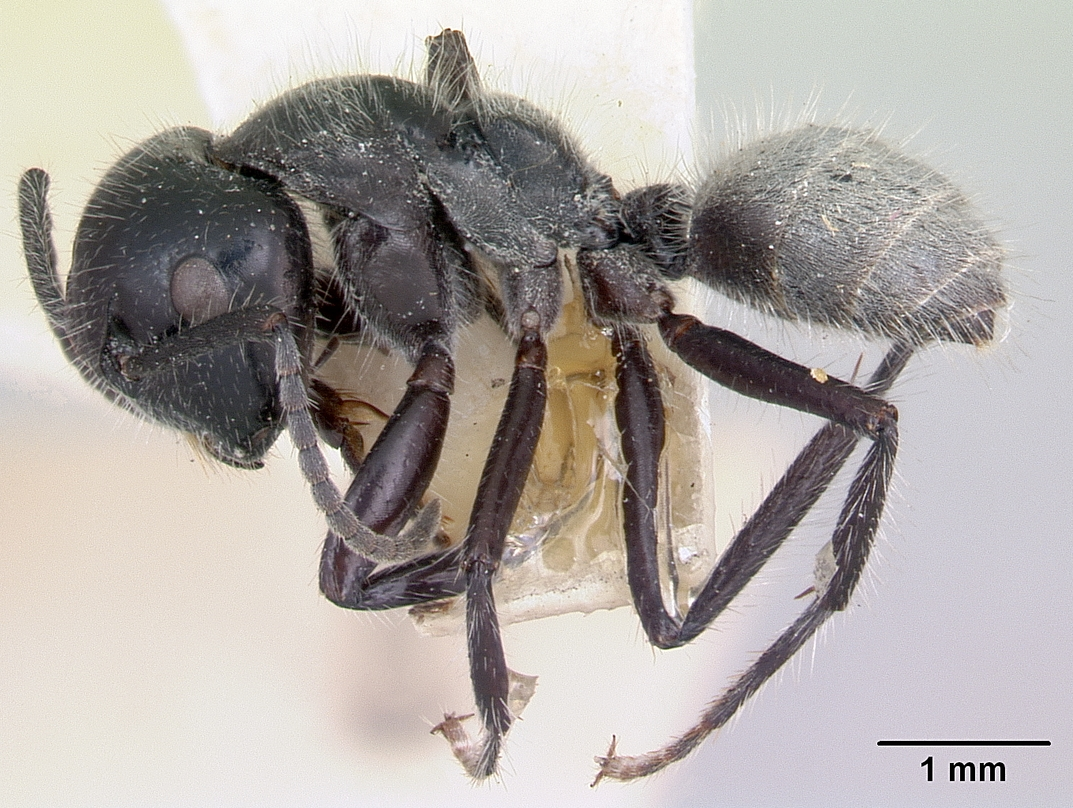
- Calomyrmex albertisi worker from Australia

Scientific classification
- Kingdom: Animalia
- Phylum: Arthropoda
- Class: Insecta
- Order: Hymenoptera
- Family: Formicidae
- Subfamily: Formicinae
- Tribe: Camponotini
- Genus: Calomyrmex; Emery, 1895

Type species
- Formica laevissima Smith, 1859

Diversity
- 9 species

= Calomyrmex =

Genus of ants

Calomyrmex is a genus of ants in the subfamily Formicinae. The genus is known from Indonesia, New Guinea and Australia. Calomyrmex has a mandibular gland that secretes red droplets on the sides of its head with a strong and unpleasant odor when disturbed.

== Species ==
- Calomyrmex albertisi (Emery, 1887)
- Calomyrmex albopilosus (Mayr, 1876)
- Calomyrmex glauerti Clark, 1930
- Calomyrmex impavidus (Forel, 1893)
- Calomyrmex laevissimus (Smith, 1859)
- Calomyrmex purpureus (Mayr, 1876)
- Calomyrmex similis (Mayr, 1876)
- Calomyrmex splendidus (Mayr, 1876)
- Calomyrmex tropicus (Smith, 1861)
