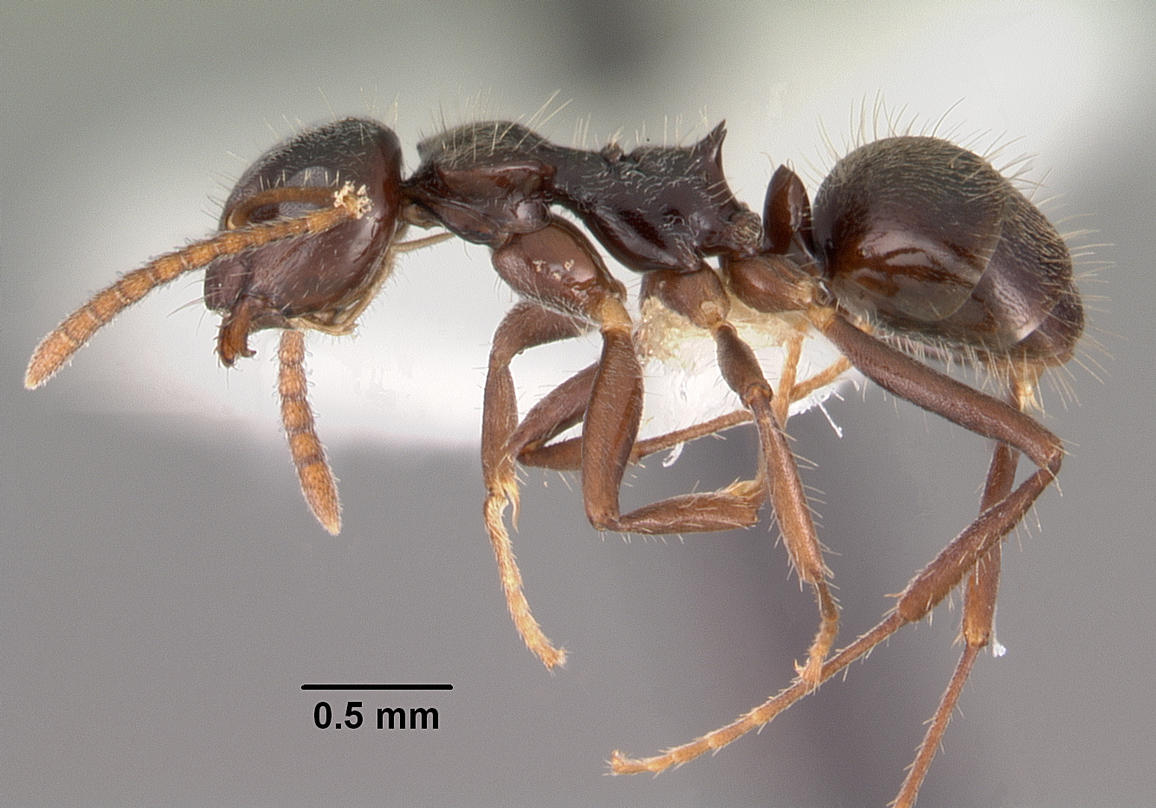
- Teratomyrmex greavesi worker from Australia

Scientific classification
- Kingdom: Animalia
- Phylum: Arthropoda
- Class: Insecta
- Order: Hymenoptera
- Family: Formicidae
- Subfamily: Formicinae
- Tribe: Melophorini
- Genus: Teratomyrmex; McAreavey, 1957

Type species
- Teratomyrmex greavesi

Diversity
- 3 species

= Teratomyrmex =

Genus of ants

Teratomyrmex is a genus of ants in the subfamily Formicinae. The genus is known only from forested areas on the east coast of Australia.

== Species ==
- Teratomyrmex greavesi McAreavey, 1957
- Teratomyrmex substrictus Shattuck & O'Reilly, 2013
- Teratomyrmex tinae Shattuck & O'Reilly, 2013
