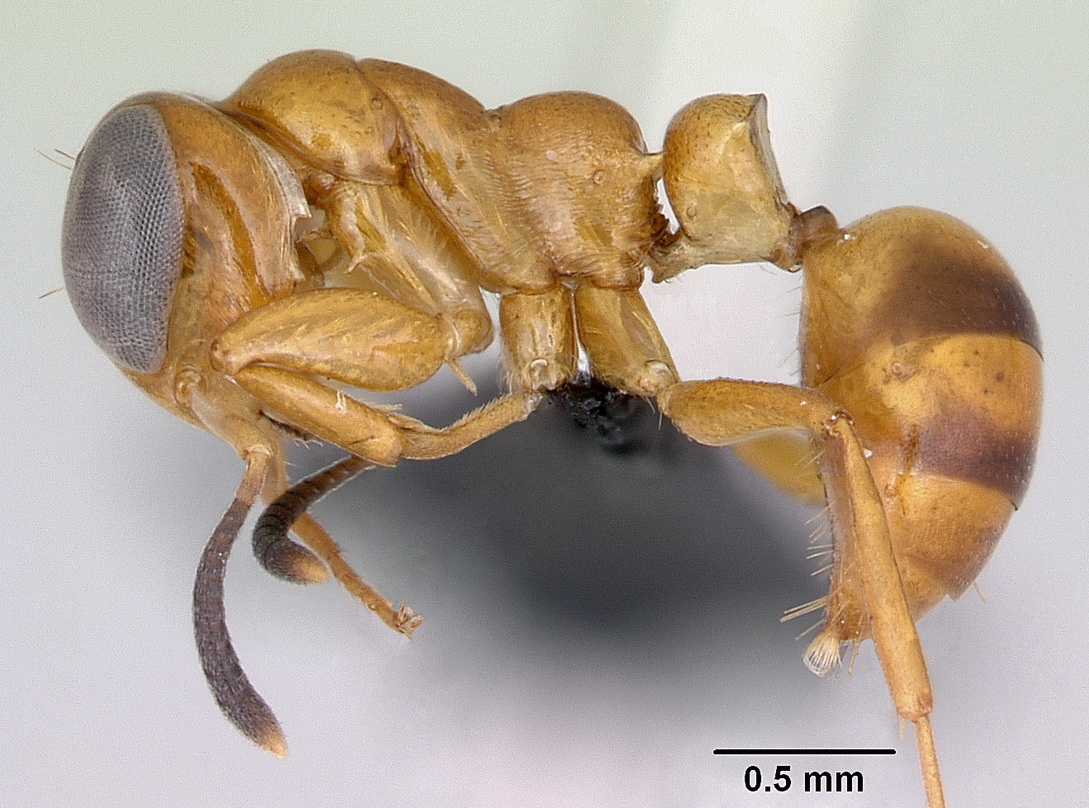
- Santschiella kohli worker from Gabon

Scientific classification
- Kingdom: Animalia
- Phylum: Arthropoda
- Class: Insecta
- Order: Hymenoptera
- Family: Formicidae
- Subfamily: Formicinae
- Tribe: Santschiellini; Forel, 1917
- Genus: Santschiella; Forel, 1916
- Species: S. kohli

Binomial name
- Santschiella kohli Forel, 1916

= Santschiella =

Genus of ants

Santschiella is an Afrotropical genus of ants in the subfamily Formicinae. It contains the single species Santschiella kohli, described by Forel in 1916 from the Democratic Republic of the Congo. The genus is known only from workers, measuring about 3 mm in length and with large eyes. Forel (1917) placed Santschiella in its own tribe, Santschiellini, where it remained until Bolton (2003) moved it to Gesomyrmecini.
