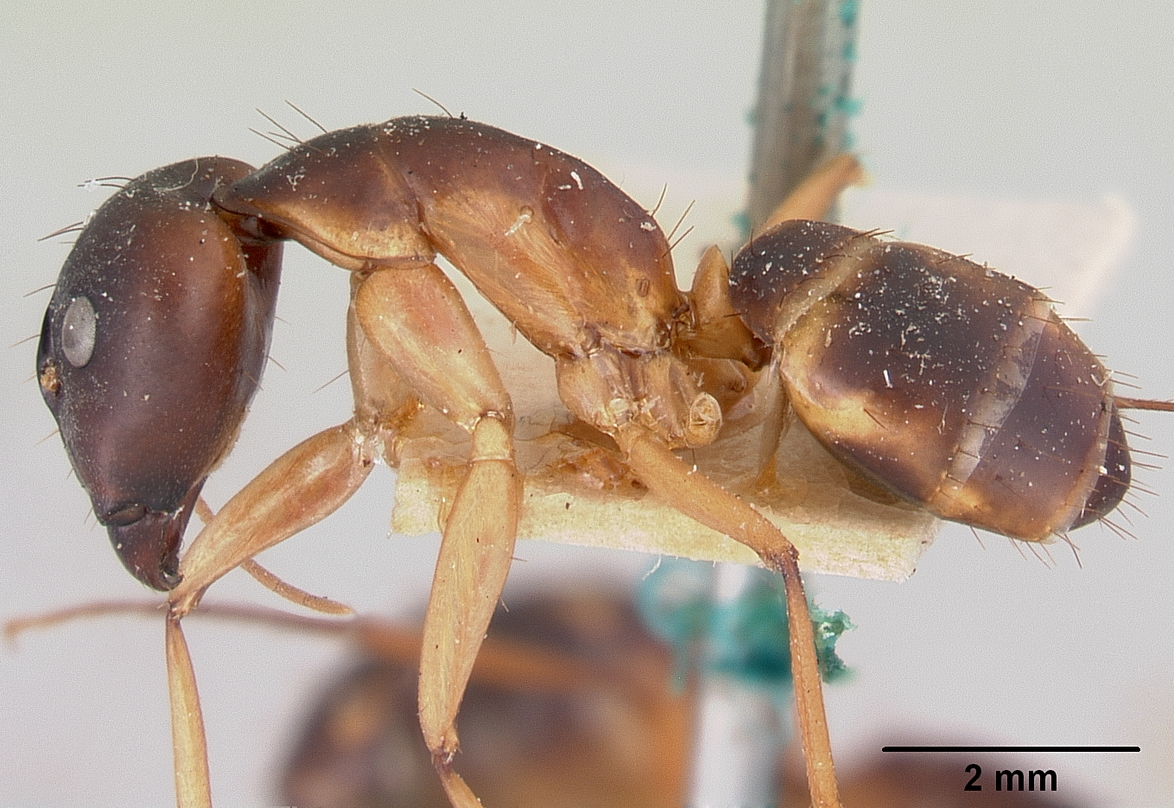

Scientific classification
- Domain: Eukaryota
- Kingdom: Animalia
- Phylum: Arthropoda
- Class: Insecta
- Order: Hymenoptera
- Family: Formicidae
- Subfamily: Formicinae
- Genus: Camponotus
- Subgenus: Tanaemyrmex
- Species: C. maculatus

Binomial name
- Camponotus maculatus (Fabricius, 1782)

Subspecies
- 6. See text

Synonyms
- Camponotus maculatus atramentarius Forel, 1904; Camponotus maculatus ballioni Forel, 1904; Camponotus maculatus boera Santschi, 1925; Camponotus maculatus cavallus Santschi, 1911; Camponotus maculatus cluisoides Forel, 1913; Camponotus maculatus conakryensis Emery, 1920; Camponotus maculatus erythraea Emery, 1920; Camponotus maculatus flavifemur Santschi, 1937; Camponotus maculatus flavominor Emery, 1925; Camponotus maculatus hannae Santschi, 1919; Camponotus maculatus hieroglyphicus Santschi, 1917; Camponotus maculatus intonsus Emery, 1905; Camponotus maculatus liocnemis Emery, 1905; Camponotus maculatus lividior Santschi, 1911; Camponotus maculatus lohieri Emery, 1915; Camponotus maculatus manzer Forel, 1910; Camponotus maculatus mathildae Forel, 1910; Camponotus maculatus melanocnemis Santschi, 1911; Camponotus maculatus miserabilis Santschi, 1914; Camponotus maculatus nubis Weber, 1943; Camponotus maculatus proletaria Baroni Urbani, 1971; Camponotus maculatus radamoide Forel, 1891; Camponotus maculatus sarmentus Emery, 1920; Camponotus maculatus schereri Forel, 1911; Camponotus maculatus schultzei Forel, 1912; Camponotus maculatus semispicatus Emery, 1920; Camponotus maculatus sudanicus Weber, 1943; Camponotus maculatus thomensis Santschi, 1920; Camponotus maculatus tuckeri Santschi, 1932; Camponotus maculatus zumpti Santschi, 1937; Camponotus sexpunctatus liengmei Forel, 1894; Formica cognata Smith, F., 1858; Formica lacteipennis Smith, F., 1858

= Camponotus maculatus =

Species of ant

Camponotus maculatus is a species of carpenter ant (genus Camponotus).

== Subspecies ==
- Camponotus maculatus foveolatus Stitz, 1925 - Philippines
- Camponotus maculatus maculatus Fabricius, 1782 - Angola, Benin, Cameroon, Central African Republic, Chad, Comoros, Eritrea, Gambia, Guinea, Ivory Coast, Kenya, Lesotho, Liberia, Mozambique, Namibia, Senegal, Sierra Leone, South Africa, Sudan, São Tomé & Principe, Tanzania, Uganda, Zimbabwe, Micronesia, Palau, Madagascar, Mauritius, Trinidad and Tobago, Algeria, Ethiopia, Iran, Oman.
- Camponotus maculatus obfuscatus Viehmeyer, 1916 - Singapore
- Camponotus maculatus subnudus Emery, 1889 - Myanmar, Philippines
- Camponotus maculatus sylvaticomaculatus Dalla Torre, 1893 - Turkey
- Camponotus maculatus ugandensis Santschi, 1923 - Uganda
