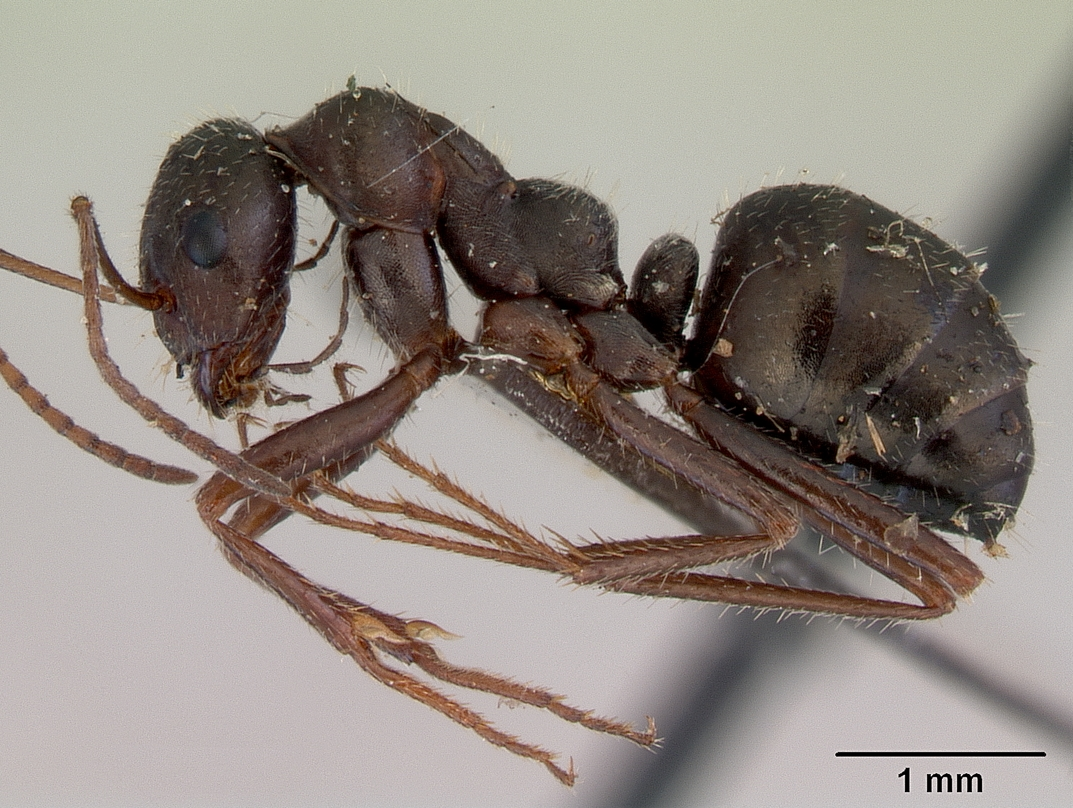
- Alloformica aberrans worker from Uzbekistan

Scientific classification
- Domain: Eukaryota
- Kingdom: Animalia
- Phylum: Arthropoda
- Class: Insecta
- Order: Hymenoptera
- Family: Formicidae
- Subfamily: Formicinae
- Tribe: Formicini
- Genus: Alloformica; Dlussky, 1969

Type species
- Formica aberrans

Diversity
- 4 species

= Alloformica =

Genus of ants

Alloformica is a genus of ants in the subfamily Formicinae. The genus was first described as a subgenus of Proformica by Dlussky (1969), later to be synonymized under Proformica by Brown (1973), and finally revived and raised to genus rank by Dlussky & Fedoseeva (1988). Its species are known only from a few localities.

== Species ==
- Alloformica aberrans (Mayr, 1877)
- Alloformica flavicornis (Kuznetsov-Ugamsky, 1926)
- Alloformica nitidior (Forel, 1904)
- Alloformica obscurior Dlussky, Soyunov & Zabelin, 1990
