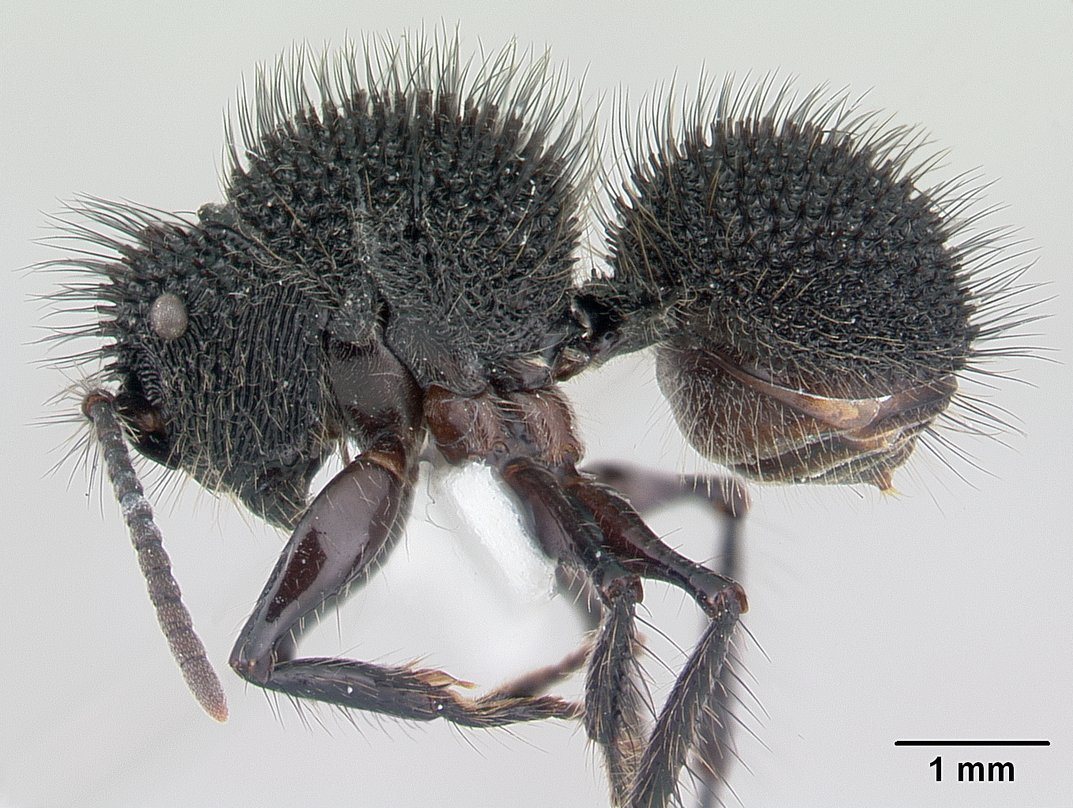
- Echinopla melanarctos worker from Indonesia

Scientific classification
- Kingdom: Animalia
- Phylum: Arthropoda
- Class: Insecta
- Order: Hymenoptera
- Family: Formicidae
- Subfamily: Formicinae
- Tribe: Camponotini
- Genus: Echinopla; Smith, 1857

Type species
- Echinopla melanarctos Smith, 1857

Diversity
- 39 species

Synonyms
- Mesoxena Smith, 1860

= Echinopla =

Genus of ants

Echinopla is a genus of ants in the subfamily Formicinae. The genus is distributed from Singapore and Sumatra (Indonesia) to the Philippines, Papua New Guinea and Australia.

== Species ==
- Echinopla angustata Zettel & Laciny, 2015
- Echinopla arfaki Donisthorpe, 1943
- Echinopla australis Forel, 1901
- Echinopla brevisetosa Zettel & Laciny, 2015
- Echinopla charernsomi Tanansathaporn & Jaitrong, 2018
- Echinopla circulus Zettel & Laciny, 2015
- Echinopla cherapunjiensis Bharti & Gul, 2012
- Echinopla crenulata Donisthorpe, 1941
- Echinopla deceptor Smith, 1863
- Echinopla densistriata Stitz, 1938
- Echinopla dubitata Smith, 1862
- Echinopla fisheri Zettel & Laciny, 2015
- Echinopla jeenthongi Tanansathaporn & Jaitrong, 2018
- Echinopla lateropilosa Zettel & Laciny, 2017
- Echinopla lineata Mayr, 1862
- Echinopla madli Zettel & Laciny, 2015
- Echinopla maeandrina Stitz, 1938
- Echinopla melanarctos Smith, 1857
- Echinopla mezgeri Zettel & Laciny, 2015
- Echinopla mistura (Smith, 1860)
- Echinopla nitida Smith, 1863
- Echinopla octodentata Stitz, 1911
- Echinopla pallipes Smith, 1857
- Echinopla praetexta Smith, 1860
- Echinopla pseudostriata Donisthorpe, 1943
- Echinopla rugosa André, 1892
- Echinopla senilis Mayr, 1862
- Echinopla serrata (Smith, 1859)
- Echinopla silvestrii Donisthorpe, 1936
- Echinopla striata Smith, 1857
- Echinopla tritschleri Forel, 1901
- Echinopla tunkuabduljalilii Laciny, Zettel, Maryati & Noor-Izwan, 2019
- Echinopla turneri Forel, 1901
- Echinopla vermiculata Emery, 1898
- Echinopla wardi Zettel & Laciny, 2015
