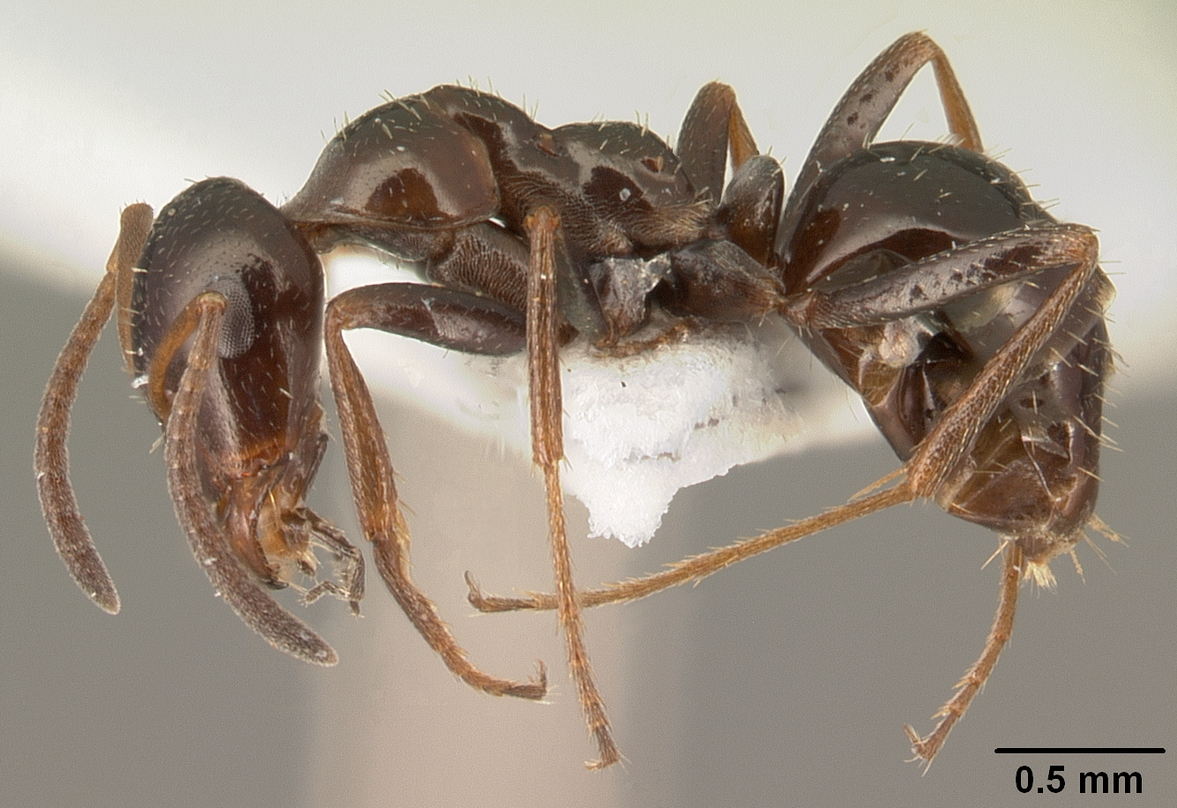
- Bajcaridris theryi worker from Morocco

Scientific classification
- Domain: Eukaryota
- Kingdom: Animalia
- Phylum: Arthropoda
- Class: Insecta
- Order: Hymenoptera
- Family: Formicidae
- Subfamily: Formicinae
- Tribe: Formicini
- Genus: Bajcaridris; Agosti, 1994

Type species
- Formica theryi

Diversity
- 3 species

= Bajcaridris =

Genus of ants

Bajcaridris is a genus of ants in the subfamily Formicinae. Its three species are known from northern Africa. B. theryi inhabits the meadows of the Atlas Mountains in Morocco, and B. kraussii and B. menozzii inhabit the wadis of the northern Sahara in Algeria.

== Species ==
- Bajcaridris kraussii (Forel, 1895)
- Bajcaridris menozzii (Santschi, 1923)
- Bajcaridris theryi (Santschi, 1936)
