= Metalasius =

Scientific classification
- Kingdom: Animalia
- Phylum: Arthropoda
- Clade: Pancrustacea
- Class: Insecta
- Order: Hymenoptera
- Family: Formicidae
- Subfamily: Formicinae
- Tribe: Lasiini
- Genus: Metalasius; Boudinot et al., 2022

Type species
- Lasius myrmidon

Species
- See text

Genus of ants

Metalasius is a genus of ants in the tribe Lasiini.

== Species ==
Metalasius consists of one extant species and one extinct species. They are as follows.

- Metalasius myrmidon
- †Metalasius pumilus
