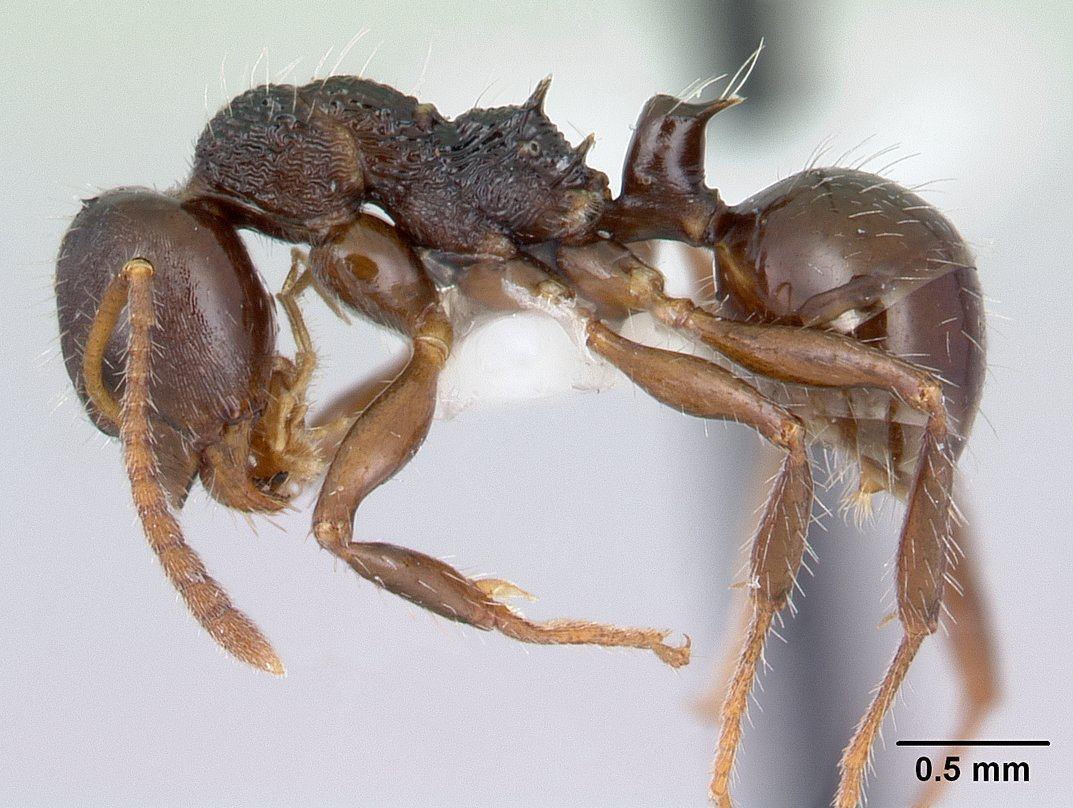
- Pseudonotoncus hirsutus worker

Scientific classification
- Kingdom: Animalia
- Phylum: Arthropoda
- Class: Insecta
- Order: Hymenoptera
- Family: Formicidae
- Subfamily: Formicinae
- Tribe: Melophorini
- Genus: Pseudonotoncus; Clark, 1934

Type species
- Pseudonotoncus hirsutus

Diversity
- 2 species

= Pseudonotoncus =

Genus of ants

Pseudonotoncus is a genus of ants in the subfamily Formicinae. The genus is known only from forested areas on the east coast of Australia.

== Species ==
- Pseudonotoncus eurysikos Shattuck & O'Reilly, 2013
- Pseudonotoncus hirsutus Clark, 1934
