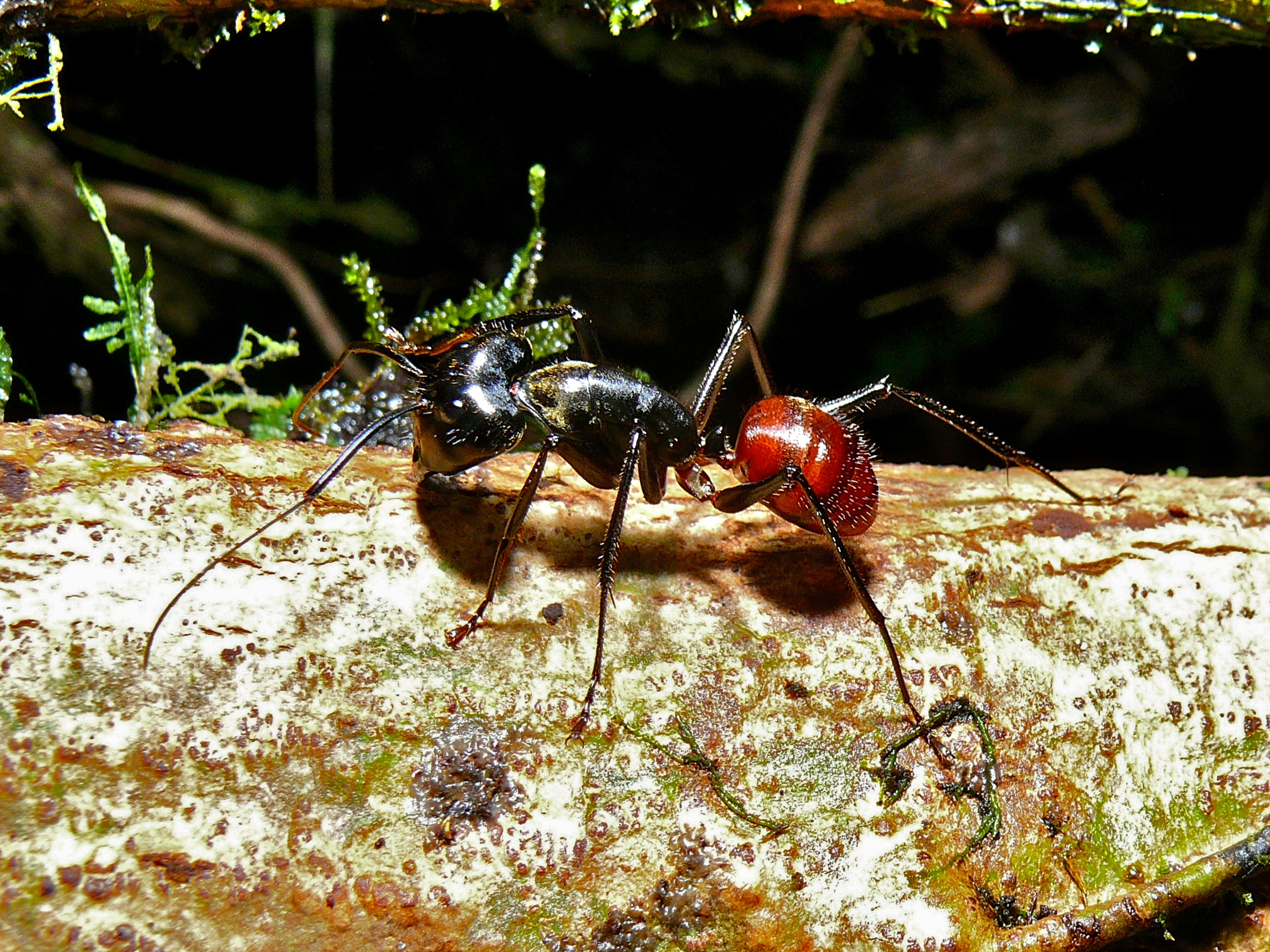

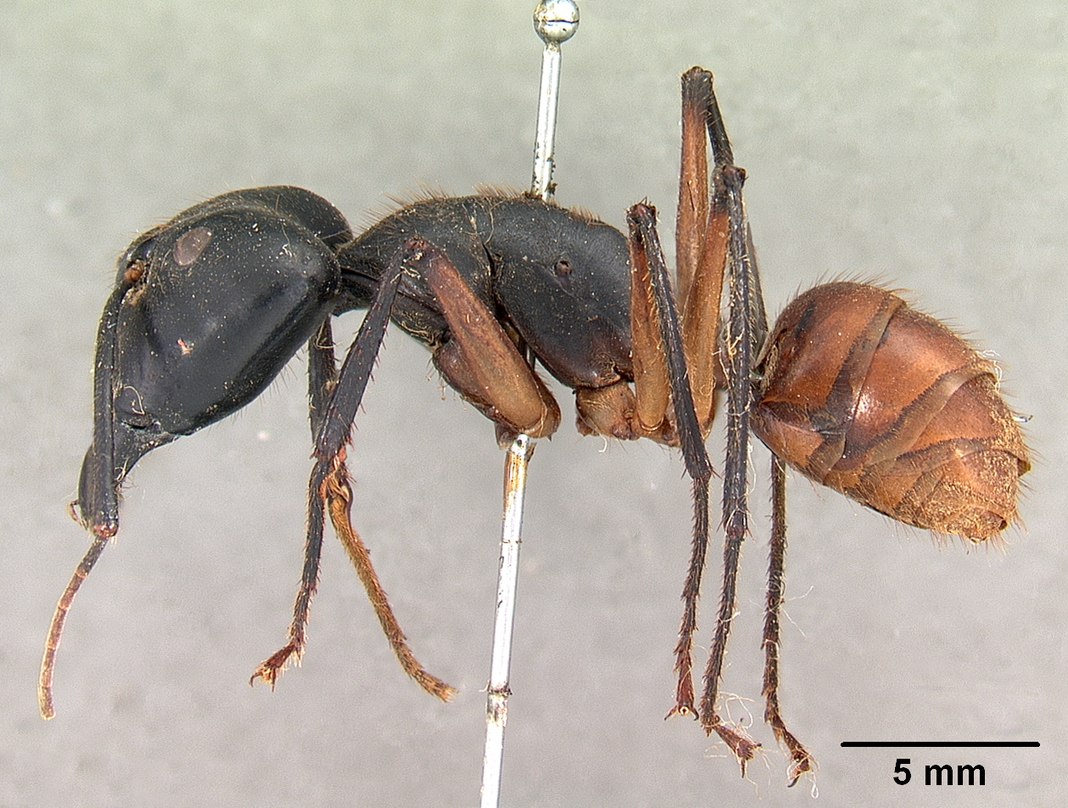
- D. g. borneensis

Scientific classification
- Kingdom: Animalia
- Phylum: Arthropoda
- Class: Insecta
- Order: Hymenoptera
- Family: Formicidae
- Subfamily: Formicinae
- Tribe: Camponotini
- Genus: Dinomyrmex; Ashmead, 1905
- Species: D. gigas

Binomial name
- Dinomyrmex gigas (Latreille, 1802)

Synonyms
- Camponotus gigas

= Dinomyrmex =

Genus of ants

Dinomyrmex is a monotypic genus of ant containing the species Dinomyrmex gigas or giant forest ant. D. gigas is a large species of ant, native to Southeast Asian forests. It is one of the largest ants in existence, measuring in at 20.9 mm (0.82 in) for normal workers, and 28.1 mm (1.11 in) for the soldiers. Honeydew makes up 90% of their diet, but they will also consume insects and bird droppings. The ant is an effective forager, utilizing both efficient communication and recruitment. A handful of these ants may meet at night to engage in what has been observed to be ritual battle. These fights can continue for several months.

Colonies consist of typically about 7,000 workers, distributed unevenly among several nests. There are two types of workers, with the larger ones almost three times as heavy. They forage mainly at night, however, some workers will be outside the nest during the day.

== Distribution ==
This species is found in Southeast Asian rain forests from Sumatra, Singapore, Malaysia, Borneo to Thailand.

== See also ==
- Dinoponera gigantea
- Titanomyrma
