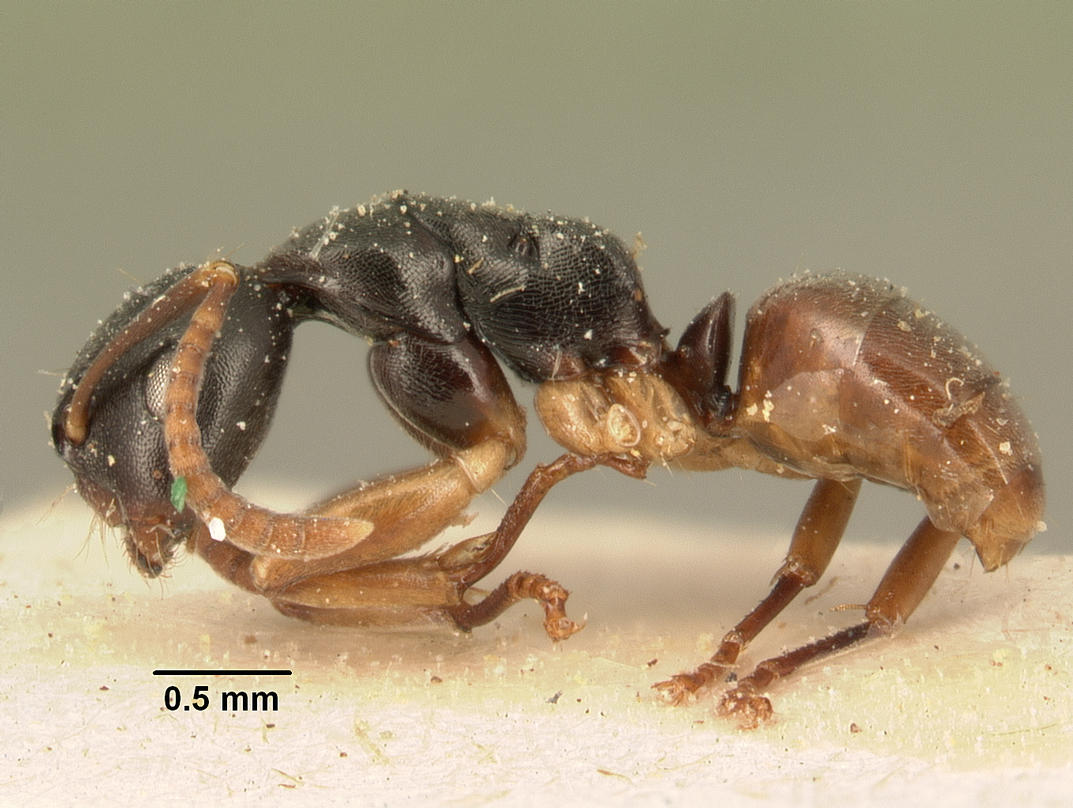
- Overbeckia subclavata worker

Scientific classification
- Kingdom: Animalia
- Phylum: Arthropoda
- Class: Insecta
- Order: Hymenoptera
- Family: Formicidae
- Subfamily: Formicinae
- Tribe: Camponotini
- Genus: Overbeckia; Viehmeyer, 1916

Diversity
- 3 species

= Overbeckia =

Species of ants

Overbeckia is a genus of ants in the subfamily Formicinae originally containing only the single species Overbeckia subclavata. Although the genus has been known over 100 years only from Singapore, where its nests were found in hollow branches of bamboo and other plants, a revision study by Klimes and coll. in 2022 showed that these ants occur across tropical SA Asia to Australasia and re-described the genus, Overbeckia subclavata. and described two new species, Overbeckia jambiensis, and Overbeckia papuana. The study also showed that more recent findings of Overbeckia in Australia are likely O. papuana, based on morphology.

== Species ==
- Overbeckia subclavata
- Overbeckia jambiensis
- Overbeckia papuana
