= Chimaeromyrma =

Scientific classification
- Domain: Eukaryota
- Kingdom: Animalia
- Phylum: Arthropoda
- Class: Insecta
- Order: Hymenoptera
- Family: Formicidae
- Subfamily: Formicinae
- Tribe: Camponotini
- Genus: †Chimaeromyrma; Dlussky, 1988
- Species: †C. brachycephala

Binomial name
- †Chimaeromyrma brachycephala Dlussky, 1988

Genus of ant

Chimaeromyrma is an extinct, monotypic genus of ant, first described in 1988 by Dlussky. It contains the single species Chimaeromyrma brachycephala.
