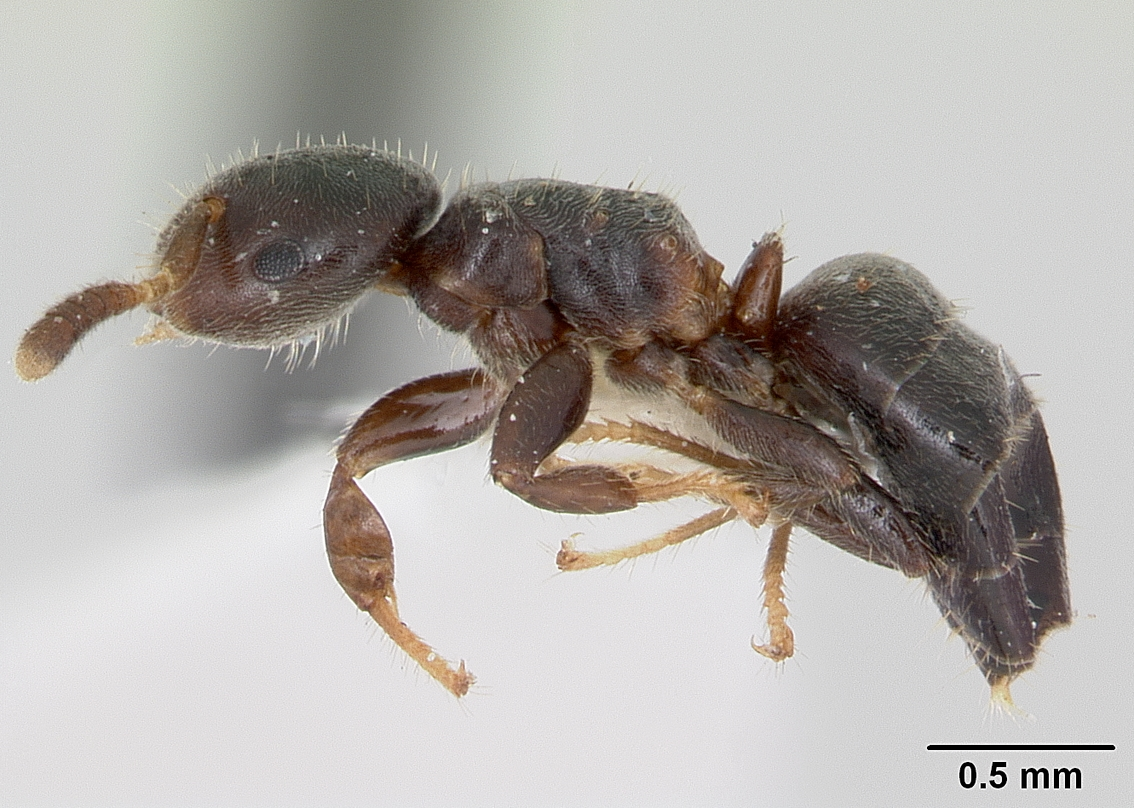
- Cladomyrma petalae worker from Malaysia

Scientific classification
- Domain: Eukaryota
- Kingdom: Animalia
- Phylum: Arthropoda
- Class: Insecta
- Order: Hymenoptera
- Family: Formicidae
- Subfamily: Formicinae
- Tribe: Lasiini
- Genus: Cladomyrma; Wheeler, 1920

Type species
- Aphomomyrmex hewitti

Diversity
- 13 species

= Cladomyrma =

Genus of ants

Cladomyrma is a genus of ants in the subfamily Formicinae. The genus is restricted to the Malay Peninsula, Borneo, and Sumatra. All known Cladomyrma species build their nests on live stems.

== Species ==
- Cladomyrma andrei (Emery, 1894)
- Cladomyrma aurochaetae Agosti, Moog & Maschwitz, 1999
- Cladomyrma crypteroniae Agosti, Moog & Maschwitz, 1999
- Cladomyrma dianeae Agosti, Moog & Maschwitz, 1999
- Cladomyrma hewitti (Wheeler, 1910)
- Cladomyrma hobbyi Donisthorpe, 1937
- Cladomyrma maryatiae Agosti, Moog & Maschwitz, 1999
- Cladomyrma maschwitzi Agosti, 1991
- Cladomyrma nudidorsalis Agosti, Moog & Maschwitz, 1999
- Cladomyrma petalae Agosti, 1991
- Cladomyrma scopulosa Eguchi & Bui, 2006
- Cladomyrma sirindhornae Jaitrong, Laedprathom & Yamane, 2013
- Cladomyrma yongi Agosti, Moog & Maschwitz, 1999
