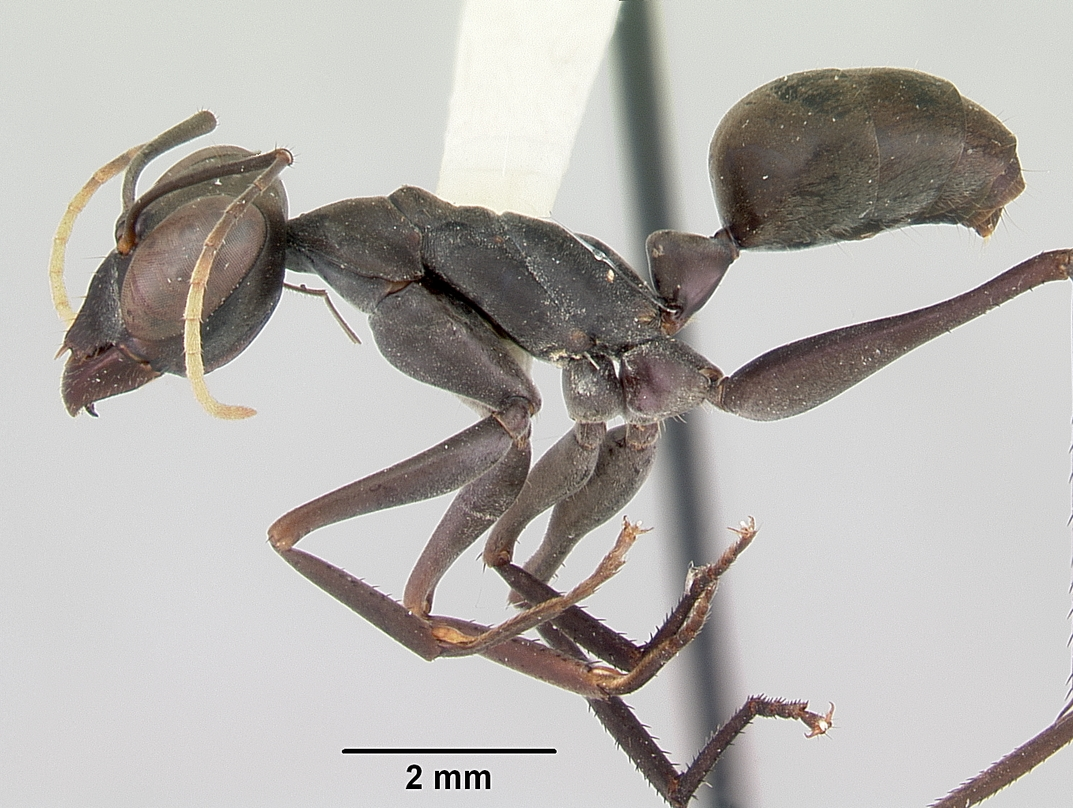
- Gigantiops destructor worker from Peru

Scientific classification
- Domain: Eukaryota
- Kingdom: Animalia
- Phylum: Arthropoda
- Class: Insecta
- Order: Hymenoptera
- Family: Formicidae
- Subfamily: Formicinae
- Tribe: Gigantiopini; Ashmead, 1905
- Genus: Gigantiops; Roger, 1863
- Species: G. destructor

Binomial name
- Gigantiops destructor (Fabricius, 1804)

Synonyms
- Formica destructor Fabricius, 1804 (type species of Gigantiops)

= Gigantiops =

Genus of ants

Gigantiops is a South American genus of jumping ants in the subfamily Formicinae. The genus contains the single species Gigantiops destructor, which is also the sole member of the tribe Gigantiopini. They have the largest eyes among all ants, are known for their ability to jump, and have the highest number of chromosomes of any member of the subfamily Formicinae (2n=78).

== Distribution and habitat ==
The genus is known from the Amazon region in South America, where they nest in soil, rotten wood or cavities excavated by other animals (beetle galleries or nests of the bullet ant, Paraponera clavata). They are distributed from about 10 degrees north to 15 degrees south of the equator.

== Feeding habits ==
During the day, workers forage solitarily on the ground and in tree branches. They feed on extrafloral nectar and small arthropods, sometimes even eating the prey on site. Larvae are fed with chewed prey. Individual workers do not cooperate while foraging; they do not recruit nestmates, and may even fight nestmates for prey.

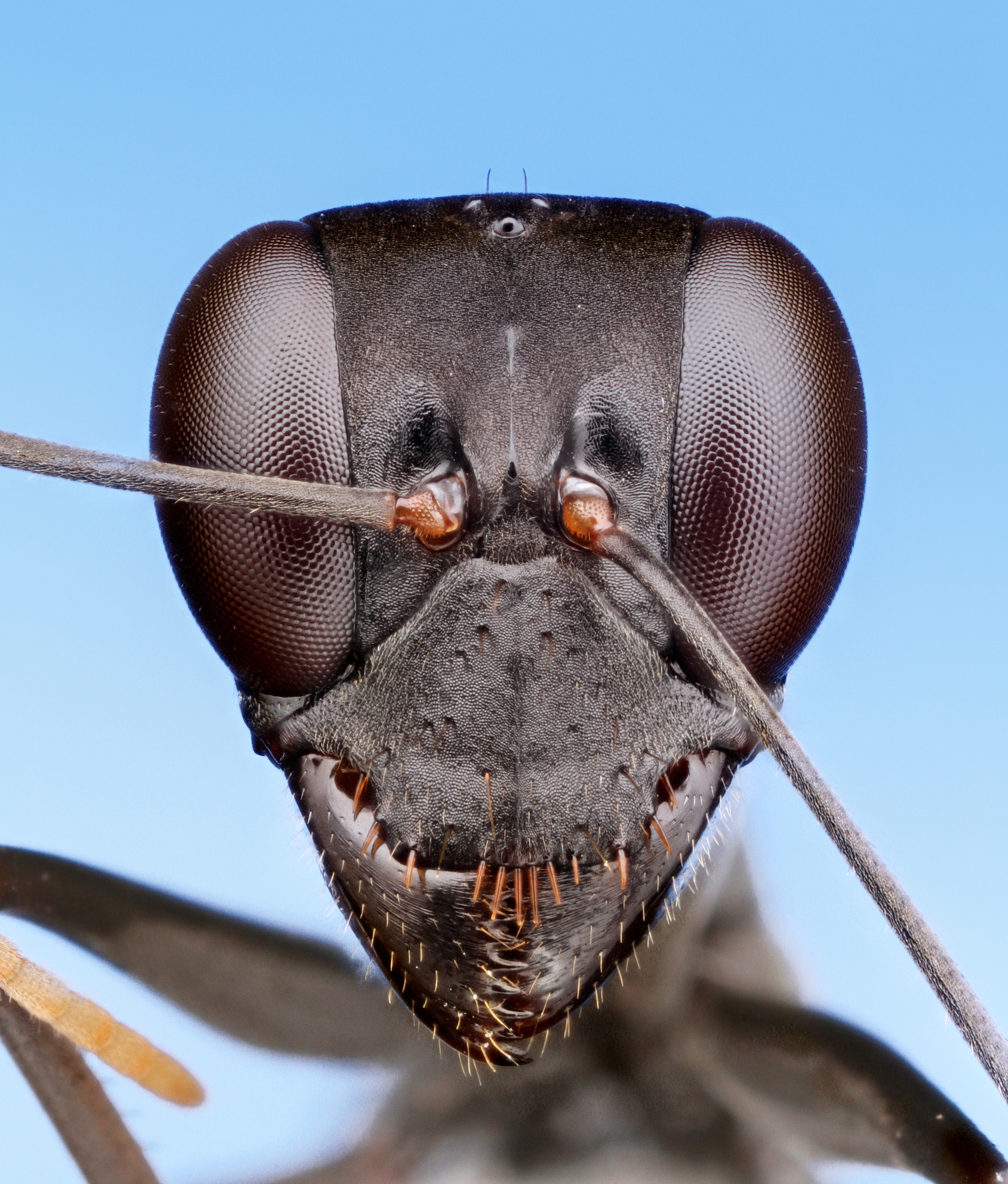
Gigantiops head
