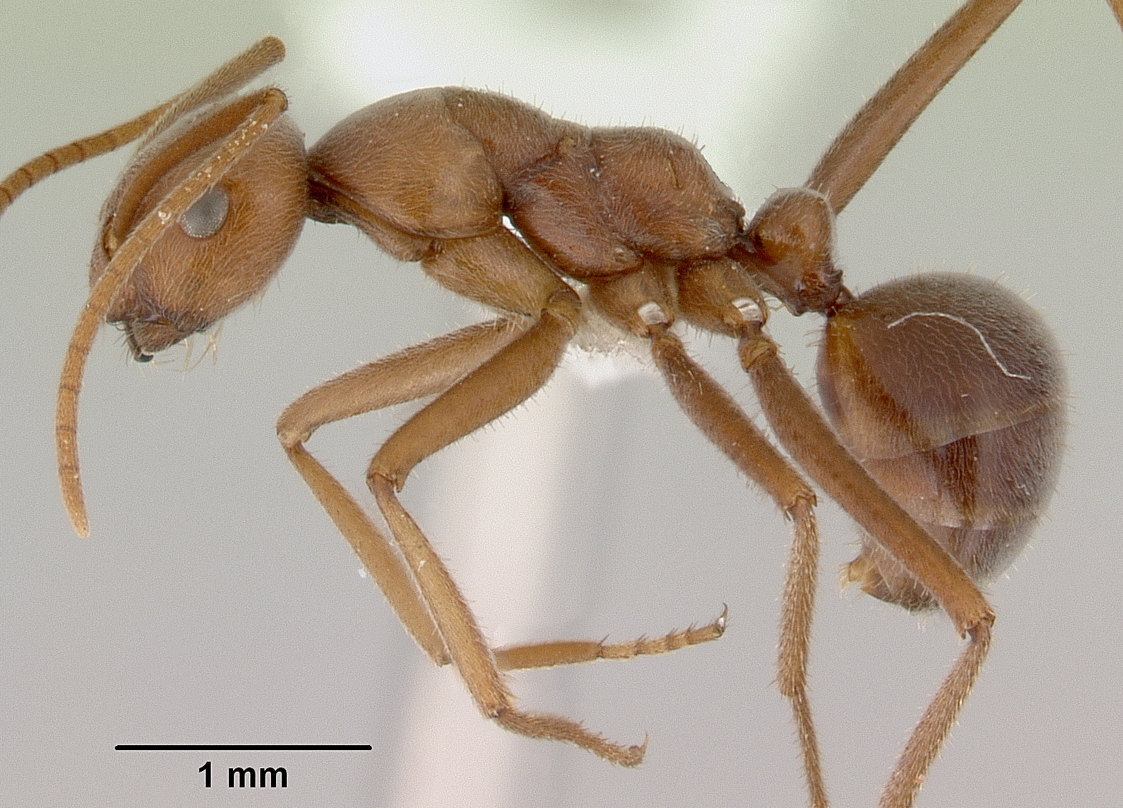
- Melophorus anderseni

Scientific classification
- Kingdom: Animalia
- Phylum: Arthropoda
- Class: Insecta
- Order: Hymenoptera
- Family: Formicidae
- Subfamily: Formicinae
- Tribe: Melophorini; Forel, 1912

Type genus
- Melophorus Lubbock, 1883

Synonyms
- Myrmecorhynchini Wheeler, 1917; Notostigmatini Bolton, 2003

= Melophorini =

Tribe of ants

Melophorini is a tribe of ants in the family Formicidae. There are about 10 genera in Melophorini.

== Genera ==
These genera belong to the tribe Melophorini:

- Lasiophanes Emery, 1895
- Melophorus Lubbock, 1883
- Myrmecorhynchus André, 1896
- Notoncus Emery, 1895
- Notostigma Emery, 1920
- Prolasius Forel, 1892
- Pseudonotoncus Clark, 1934
- Stigmacros Forel, 1905
- Teratomyrmex McAreavey, 1957
