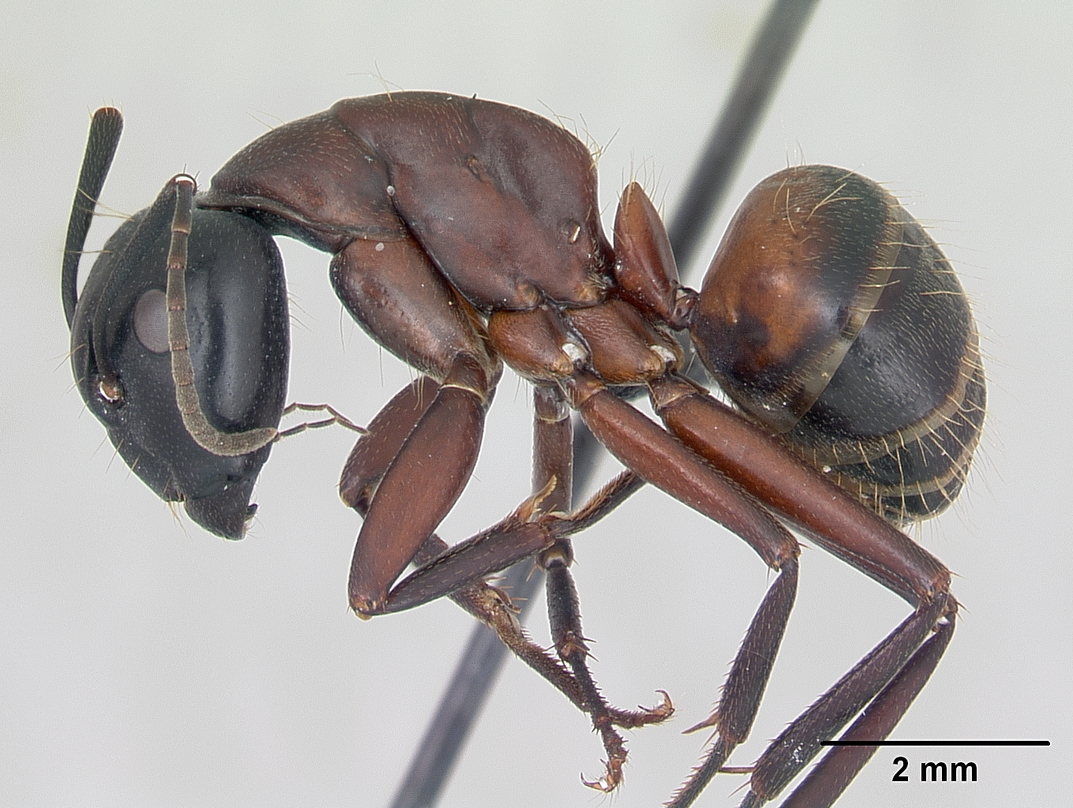
- Worker

Scientific classification
- Kingdom: Animalia
- Phylum: Arthropoda
- Clade: Pancrustacea
- Class: Insecta
- Order: Hymenoptera
- Family: Formicidae
- Subfamily: Formicinae
- Genus: Camponotus
- Subgenus: Camponotus
- Species: C. ligniperda

Binomial name
- Camponotus ligniperda (Latreille, 1802)

= Camponotus ligniperda =

Brown-black carpenter ant

Camponotus ligniperda, the brown-black carpenter ant, is a common species of carpenter ant distributed widely throughout Europe. Found in a variety of woodland habitats, they commonly nest on the ground in dry tree stumps, dead fallen trees, or beneath stones and wooden logs that are partially buried. C. ligniperda is an ecologically dominant species wherever it is found due to both its large size and particularly aggressive nature.

== Description ==
Camponotus ligniperda is one of if not the largest extant ant species found in Europe, with queens reaching lengths of 16–18 mm (potentially 20 mm when physogastric) followed by 14–15 mm major workers. Intermediate and minor workers measure on average 7–10 mm. Individuals are typically bicolored with a black head and a reddish brown thorax, the color bleeding into the legs and anterior segment of the dark colored gaster. Considered a sister species to Camponotus herculeanus, the species can be distinguished by its larger size, brighter color and shinier gaster.

== Biology ==
=== Behavior ===
C. ligniperda is behaviorally similar to C. herculeanus, but differs primarily in its nesting habits as it is considered a more xerothermic species of the two. As both are generally sympatric and share similar habitats, including conifer forests in the northernmost parts of their range to the mixed deciduous woodlands common to central Europe, C. ligniperda deviates in that it is overall less boreal and prefers sunnier, drier areas where it is found.

These ants aggressively defend their nests and when alarmed, workers intermittently and rapidly knock on the walls of their nest with their mandibles. When nearby workers sense these knocks, they move closer to the source and become increasingly aggressive towards any disturbance in their immediate vicinity. As aggressive as they may be, the bites from the workers of this species even from the larger majors are not particularly significant to humans. Despite so, these ants are fiercely territorial against other species of ant for which they're sympatric with and the majors can be quite effective in this regard, being capable of decapitating the workers of Formica or of other Camponotus species. Workers are active both during the day and night, foraging for insect prey or for the sweet secretions produced by sap-sucking hemipterans. Seasonal activity peaks during midsummer and declines during the onset of fall. These ants like their relative C. herculeanus are extremely cold tolerant and can enter a lengthy diapause period as long as 4–5 months during the winter. Colonies are slow to grow but when mature can exceed 7,000 workers in population. Mature colonies may also occupy numerous satellite nests over a wide area.

Similar to C. herculeanus, C. ligniperda is an occasional pest of structures as it can excavate into and inhabit the wooden frameworks of homes and buildings, much to the dismay of property owners. Treatment usually involves insecticidal spraying of known nests, usage of poison baits or fixing sources of water leaks to prevent the softening of wood that makes it ideal for invasion by these ants.

=== Reproduction ===
C. ligniperda has its nuptial flights from late May to July. These large ants develop slowly with the first workers emerging 1.8 months or more after the first eggs were laid.
