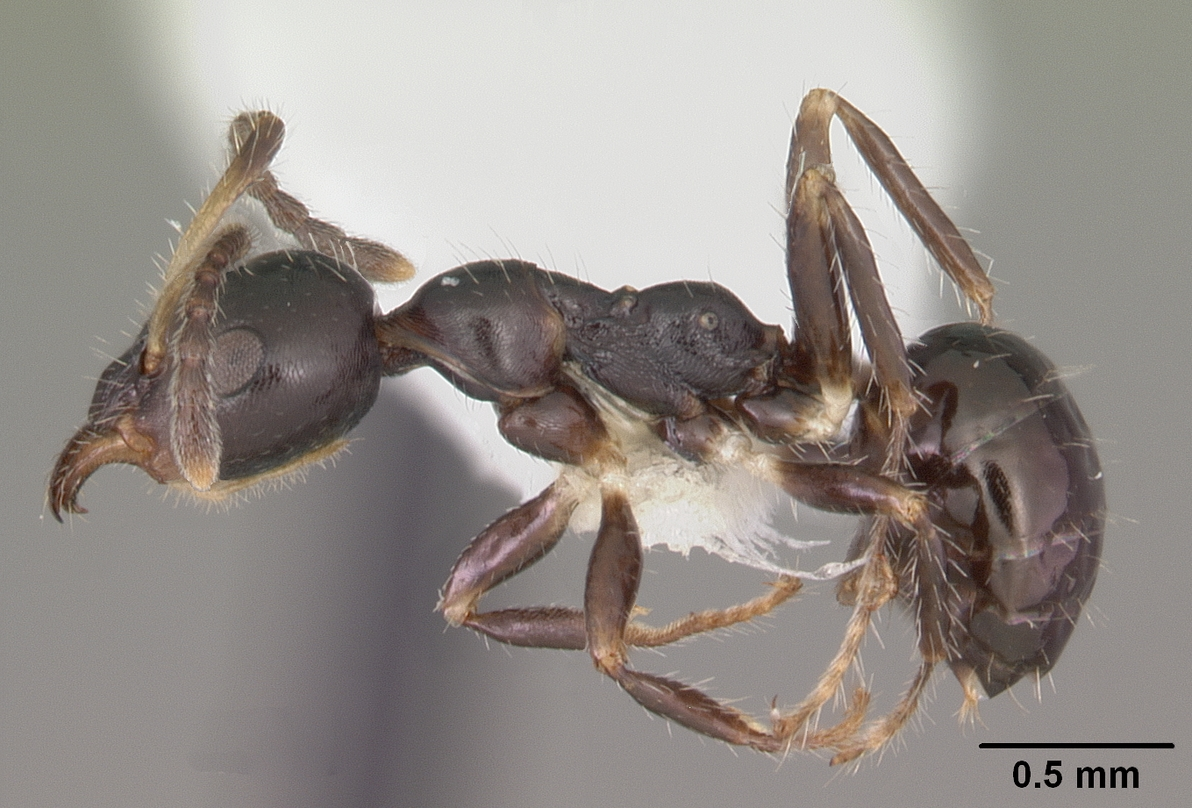
- Myrmecorhynchus emeryi worker from Australia

Scientific classification
- Kingdom: Animalia
- Phylum: Arthropoda
- Class: Insecta
- Order: Hymenoptera
- Family: Formicidae
- Subfamily: Formicinae
- Tribe: Melophorini
- Genus: Myrmecorhynchus; André, 1896

Type species
- Myrmecorhynchus emeryi André, 1896

Diversity
- 3 species

= Myrmecorhynchus =

Genus of ants

Myrmecorhynchus is a genus of ants in the subfamily Formicinae. The genus is endemic to Australia, where its species are found in forested areas. They nest in soil or on trees or shrubs.

== Species ==
- Myrmecorhynchus carteri Clark, 1934
- Myrmecorhynchus emeryi André, 1896
- Myrmecorhynchus nitidus Clark, 1934
