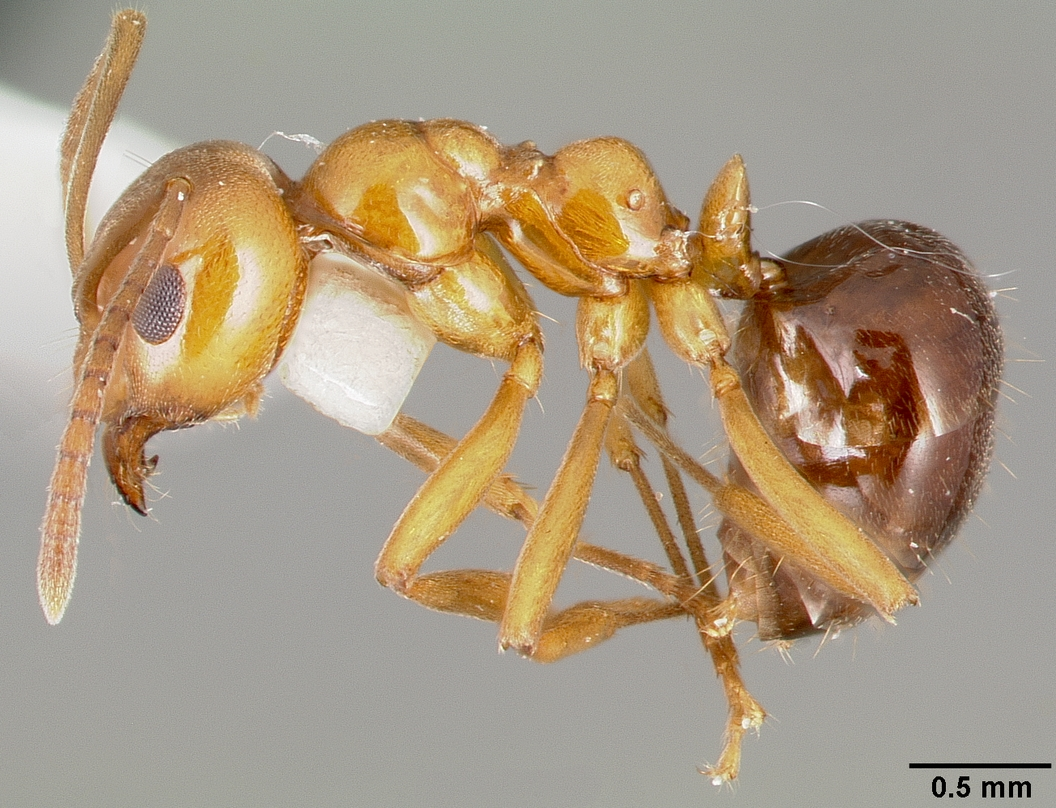
- Lasiophanes hoffmanni worker from Chile

Scientific classification
- Domain: Eukaryota
- Kingdom: Animalia
- Phylum: Arthropoda
- Class: Insecta
- Order: Hymenoptera
- Family: Formicidae
- Subfamily: Formicinae
- Tribe: Melophorini
- Genus: Lasiophanes; Emery, 1895

Type species
- Formica nigriventris (junior primary homonym replaced by Formica atriventris)

Diversity
- 6 species

= Lasiophanes =

Genus of ants

Lasiophanes is a small genus of ant with six described species endemic to Patagonia (Argentina and Chile). The genus is related to Lasius of the Northern Hemisphere and Melophorus of Australia and New Zealand.

Little is known about these species and the taxonomy of Lasiophanes is poorly understood.

== Species ==
- Lasiophanes atriventris (Smith, 1858)
- Lasiophanes hoffmanni (Forel, 1903)
- Lasiophanes perplexus (Santschi, 1920)
- Lasiophanes picinus (Roger, 1863)
- Lasiophanes strenua (Haliday, 1836)
- Lasiophanes valdiviensis (Forel, 1904)

== Habitat and distribution ==
L. atriventris has arboreal habits, living and nesting on trees. On the other hand, L. picinus and L. valdiviensis are terrestrial species and have almost the same geographical distribution. The species have been found at Neuquén, Río Negro, Chubut and Santa Cruz provinces but only L. picinus reaches the southern tip of Patagonia at Tierra del Fuego. Despite the similarity in their geographical ranges, patterns of habitat use are thought to be different. L. picinus lives in humid areas of western Patagonia but it can penetrate more arid areas following the vegetation that grows along the rivers or where subterranean water makes the soil more humid. L. valdiviensis in turn, lives in more arid areas in the eastern part of the genus distribution. However, within the arid areas L. valdiviensis is thought to prefer sites with relatively humid soils.
