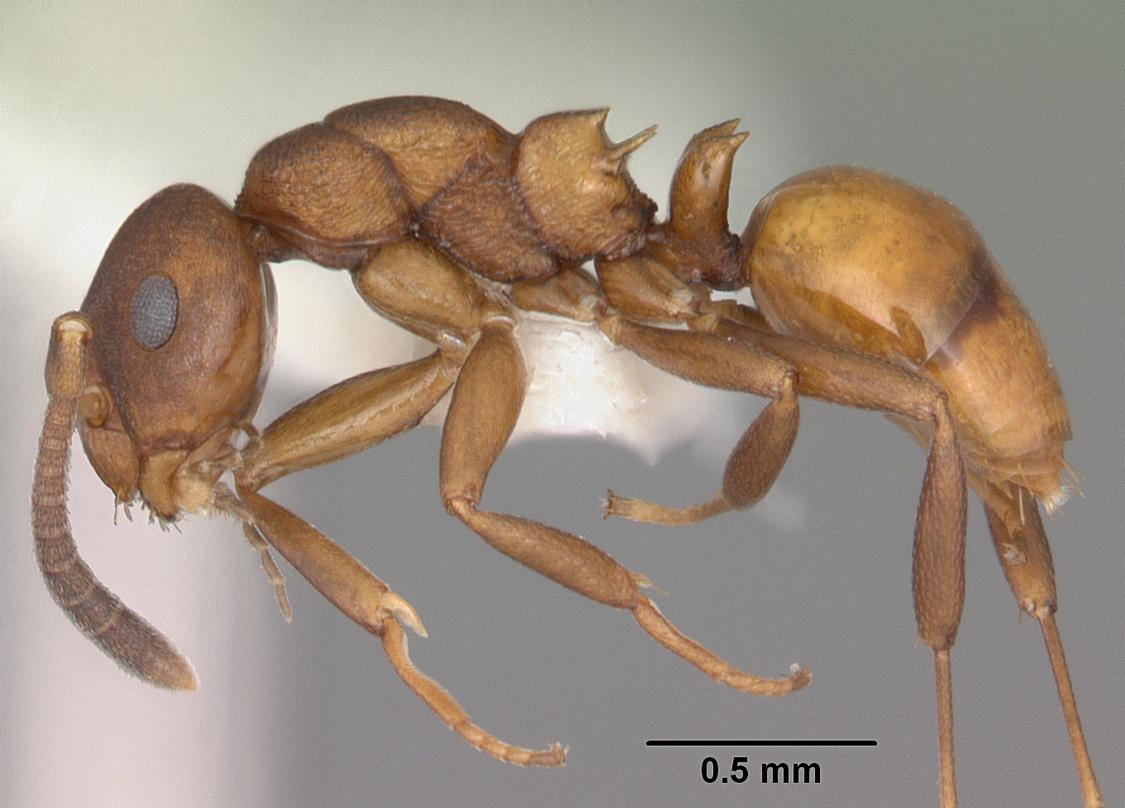
- Stigmacros punctatissima worker

Scientific classification
- Kingdom: Animalia
- Phylum: Arthropoda
- Class: Insecta
- Order: Hymenoptera
- Family: Formicidae
- Subfamily: Formicinae
- Tribe: Melophorini
- Genus: Stigmacros; Forel, 1905

Diversity
- 49 species

Synonyms
- Acrostigma Forel, 1902; Campostigmacros McAreavey, 1957; Chariostigmacros McAreavey, 1957; Cyrtostigmacros McAreavey, 1957; Hagiostigmacros McAreavey, 1957; Pseudostigmacros McAreavey, 1957

= Stigmacros =

Genus of ants

Stigmacros is a genus of small ants in the subfamily Formicinae endemic to Australia. They are generalist predators that forage in leaf litter, on the ground, or on trees.

== Species ==
- Stigmacros aciculata McAreavey, 1957
- Stigmacros acuta McAreavey, 1957
- Stigmacros aemula (Forel, 1907)
- Stigmacros anthracina McAreavey, 1957
- Stigmacros armstrongi McAreavey, 1957
- Stigmacros australis (Forel, 1902)
- Stigmacros barretti Santschi, 1928
- Stigmacros bosii (Forel, 1902)
- Stigmacros brachytera McAreavey, 1957
- Stigmacros brevispina McAreavey, 1957
- Stigmacros brooksi McAreavey, 1957
- Stigmacros castanea McAreavey, 1957
- Stigmacros clarki McAreavey, 1957
- Stigmacros clivispina (Forel, 1902)
- Stigmacros debilis Bolton, 1995
- Stigmacros elegans McAreavey, 1949
- Stigmacros epinotalis McAreavey, 1957
- Stigmacros extreminigra McAreavey, 1957
- Stigmacros ferruginea McAreavey, 1957
- Stigmacros flava McAreavey, 1957
- Stigmacros flavinodis Clark, 1938
- Stigmacros foreli (Viehmeyer, 1925)
- Stigmacros fossulata (Viehmeyer, 1925)
- Stigmacros froggatti (Forel, 1902)
- Stigmacros glauerti McAreavey, 1957
- Stigmacros hirsuta McAreavey, 1957
- Stigmacros impressa McAreavey, 1957
- Stigmacros inermis McAreavey, 1957
- Stigmacros intacta (Viehmeyer, 1925)
- Stigmacros lanaris McAreavey, 1957
- Stigmacros major McAreavey, 1957
- Stigmacros marginata McAreavey, 1957
- Stigmacros medioreticulata (Viehmeyer, 1925)
- Stigmacros minor McAreavey, 1957
- Stigmacros nitida McAreavey, 1957
- Stigmacros occidentalis (Crawley, 1922)
- Stigmacros pilosella (Viehmeyer, 1925)
- Stigmacros proxima McAreavey, 1957
- Stigmacros punctatissima McAreavey, 1957
- Stigmacros pusilla McAreavey, 1957
- Stigmacros rectangularis McAreavey, 1957
- Stigmacros reticulata Clark, 1930
- Stigmacros rufa McAreavey, 1957
- Stigmacros sordida McAreavey, 1957
- Stigmacros spinosa McAreavey, 1957
- Stigmacros stanleyi McAreavey, 1957
- Stigmacros striata McAreavey, 1957
- Stigmacros termitoxena Wheeler, 1936
- Stigmacros wilsoni McAreavey, 1957
