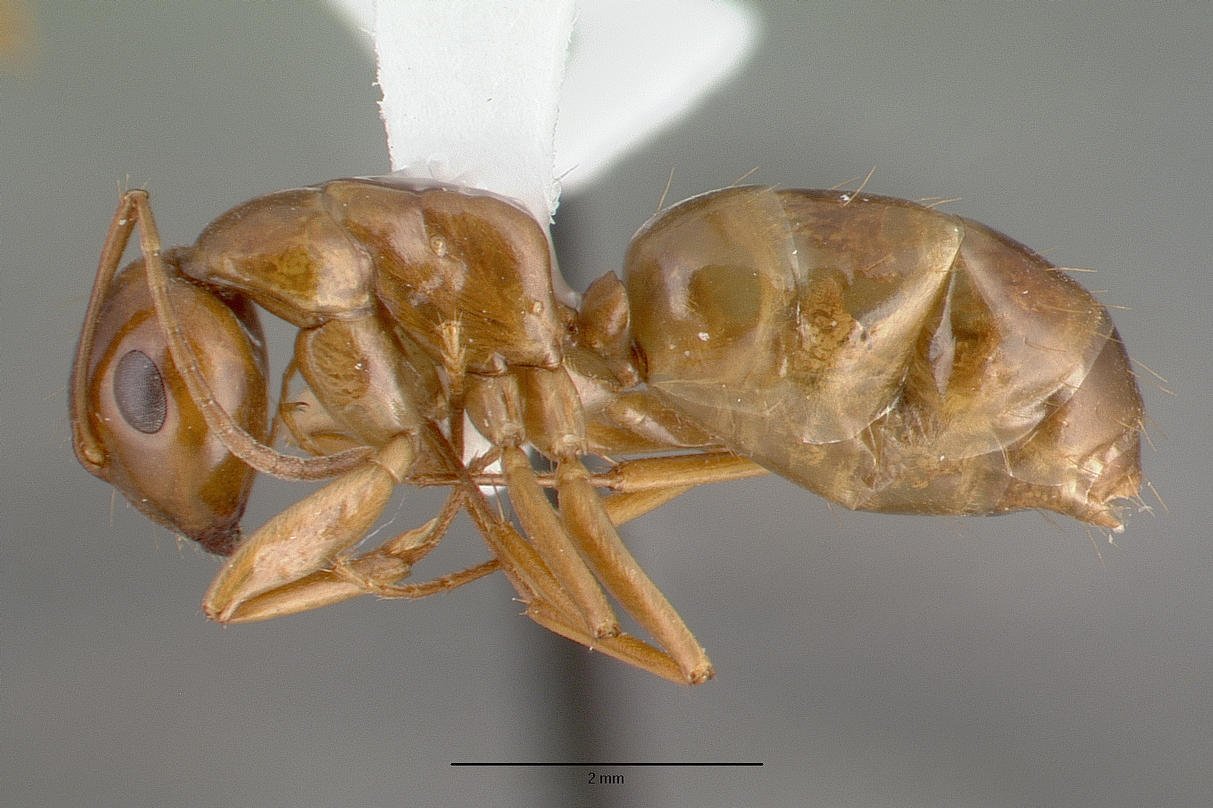
- A worker specimen of L. melina on AntWeb

Scientific classification
- Kingdom: Animalia
- Phylum: Arthropoda
- Class: Insecta
- Order: Hymenoptera
- Family: Formicidae
- Subfamily: Formicinae
- Tribe: Camponotini
- Genus: Lathidris; Ward et al. 2025

Diversity
- 3 species

= Lathidris =

Genus of ants

Lathidris is a small genus of ants in the subfamily Formicinae, consisting of three species, and native to Mexico and Central America. Its species were previously in the genus Camponotus as the Camponotus montivagus species group under subgenus Myrmentoma, although Ward et al. 2025 split it out into its own genus with phylogenetic analysis. Its scientific name means "ant that escaped notice" from ancient Greek látho + idris.

== Species ==
As of 2025, Lathidris comprises three species.

- Lathidris melina (Mackay, 1997)
- Lathidris montivaga (Forel, 1885)
- Lathidris rectithorax (Forel, 1895)

== See also ==
- Camponotini
- Camponotus
