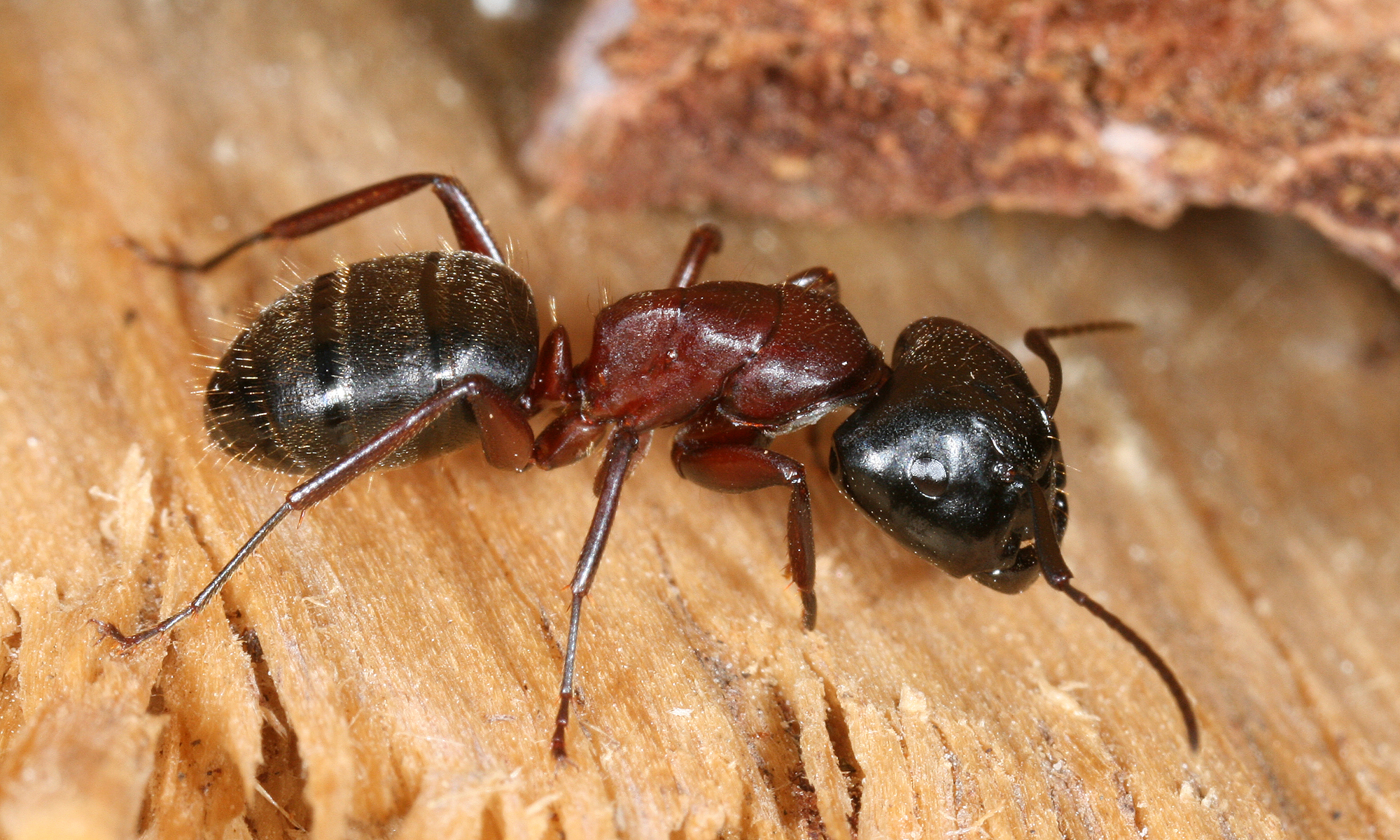
- Camponotus ligniperda

Scientific classification
- Kingdom: Animalia
- Phylum: Arthropoda
- Class: Insecta
- Order: Hymenoptera
- Family: Formicidae
- Subfamily: Formicinae
- Tribe: Camponotini; Forel, 1878

Type genus
- Camponotus Mayr, 1861

Diversity
- 13 genera

= Camponotini =

Tribe of insects

Camponotini is a tribe of ants in the subfamily Formicinae containing 2 extinct and 11 extant genera, including Camponotus (carpenter ants). This tribe is the most diverse tribe in its subfamily, containing over 2,500 species. Ants in the Camponotini tribe are the primary hosts of Ophiocordyceps unilateralis, also called the zombie-ant fungus.

== Genera ==
- Calomyrmex Emery, 1895
- Camponotus Mayr, 1861
- †Chimaeromyrma Dlussky, 1988
- Colobopsis Mayr, 1861
- Dinomyrmex Ashmead, 1905
- Echinopla Smith, 1857
- Lathidris Ward et al, 2025
- Opisthopsis Dalla Torre, 1893
- Overbeckia Viehmeyer, 1916
- Polyrhachis Smith, 1857
- †Pseudocamponotus Carpenter, 1930
- Retalimyrma Ward et al, 2025
- Uwari Ward et al, 2025

== Phylogeny ==
Ward et al. 2025 provides this as the maximum-probability cladogram.

- Camponotini
  - Colobopsis
  - - - Opisthopsis
      - Uwari
    - - Lathidris
      - - Dinomyrmex
        - - Polyrhachis
          - - Retalimyrma
            - - Camponotus
              - - Echinopla
                - - Calomyrmex
                  - Overbeckia
