= Blochmannia =

Scientific classification (Candidatus)
- Domain: Bacteria
- Phylum: Pseudomonadota
- Class: Gammaproteobacteria
- Order: Enterobacterales
- Family: Enterobacteriaceae
- Genus: Candidatus Blochmannia

Genus of bacteria

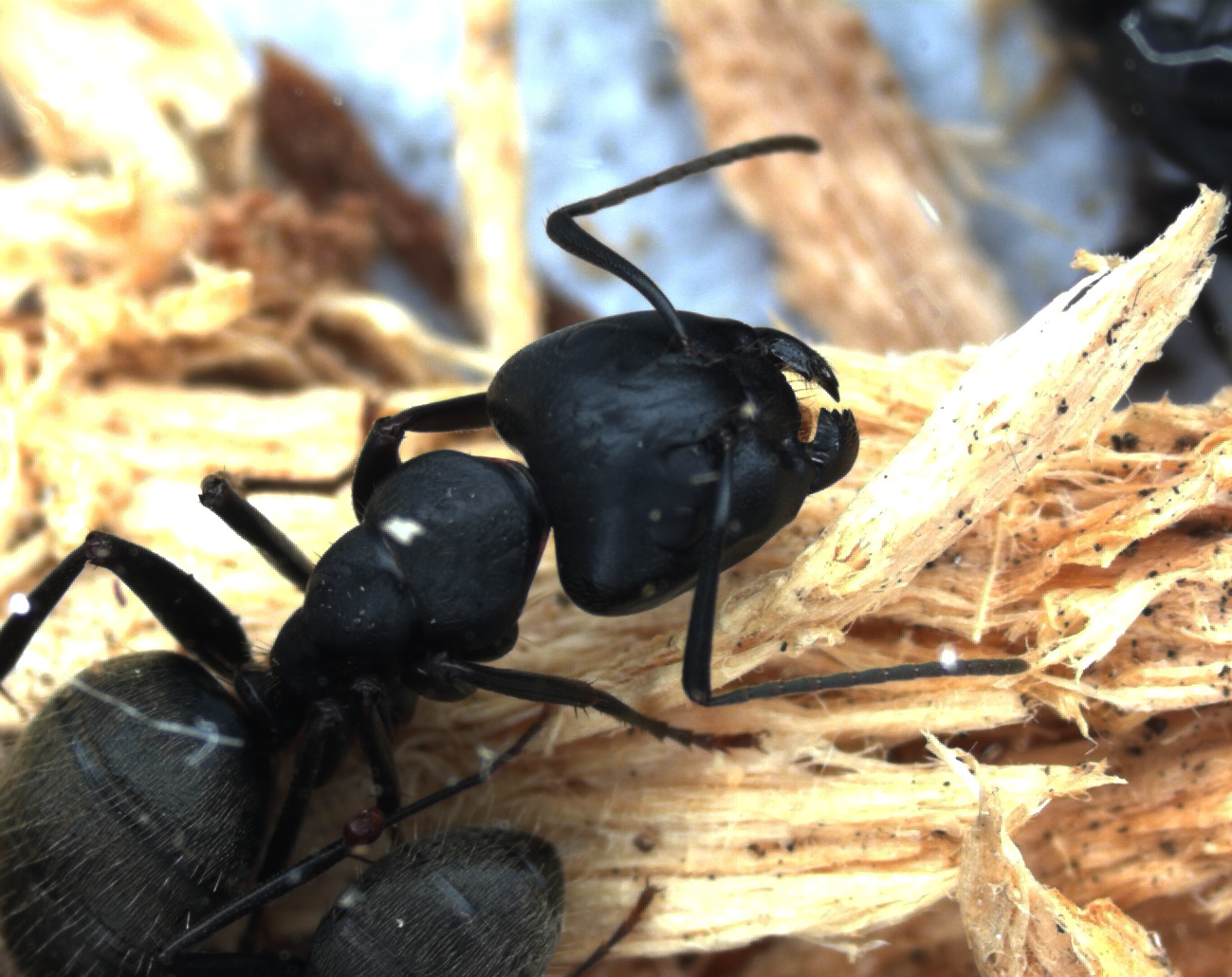
Like other species of the ant genus Camponotus (carpenter ants), the wood-nesting C. pennsylvanicus (shown here) possesses the obligate bacterial endosymbiont Blochmannia

Blochmannia is a genus of symbiotic bacteria found in carpenter ants (genus Camponotus) and their allies in the tribe Camponotini. As of 2014, Blochmannia has been discovered in the guts of over 60 species across 6 genera within the Camponotini, and is predicted to be pervasive throughout the tribe. Blochmannia was first discovered by zoologist Friedrich Blochmann in 1887, who described "bacteria-like structures" in the ovaries and midgut of Camponotus ligniperdus in 1887. In 2000, Candidatus Blochmannia was proposed as its own genus.

== Biology ==
Blochmannia bacteria are found in the midguts and ovaries of camponotine ants. Within the midgut, large numbers of Blochmannia are found in bacteriocytes in the gut's epithelial layer. Blochmannia is important in synthesizing essential and non essential amino acids, including tyrosine, and it helps the ant to process nitrogen. The Blochmannia bacteria improves the ants’ nutrition and, in doing this, it is also important to the overall health of the ant colony. According to the study by Zientz et al., Blochmannia improves the health of the colony of ants as a whole because worker ants use a "trophallaxis and regurgitation" system to provide the colony with food. When control colonies which had Blochmannia were compared to groups where the worker ants had been given antibiotics to reduce their levels of Blochmannia, the health of the control colony was superior. Zientz proposes that this superior fitness of the control ant colonies is likely due to Blochmannia improving the nutritional quality of the food that worker ants supply to the young ants, as the health effects of Blochmannia appear to decrease with the ant's maturation.

Blochmannia bacteria are sensitive to heat. In one experiment, when exposed to an increased heat of 99.87 °F (37.7 °C) for 4 weeks, over 99% of Blochmannia disappeared. However, even after 16 weeks exposure of this heat exposure, trace small amounts of Blochmannia survived. According to researchers Fan and Wernegreen, this experiment suggests that the Blochmannia in ants could be vulnerable to the effects of global warming.

== Evolution ==
Endosymbiosis, or when the Blochmannia bacteria and the ant hosts became bonded, occurred around 30–40 million years ago. In comparing two species of Blochmannia that diverged evolutionarily around 15-20 million years ago, the extreme similarity between their genes means Blochmannia bacteria have high levels of genetic conservation. The high amounts of genetic conservation suggest that the Blochmannia genes lack some recombination mechanisms.
