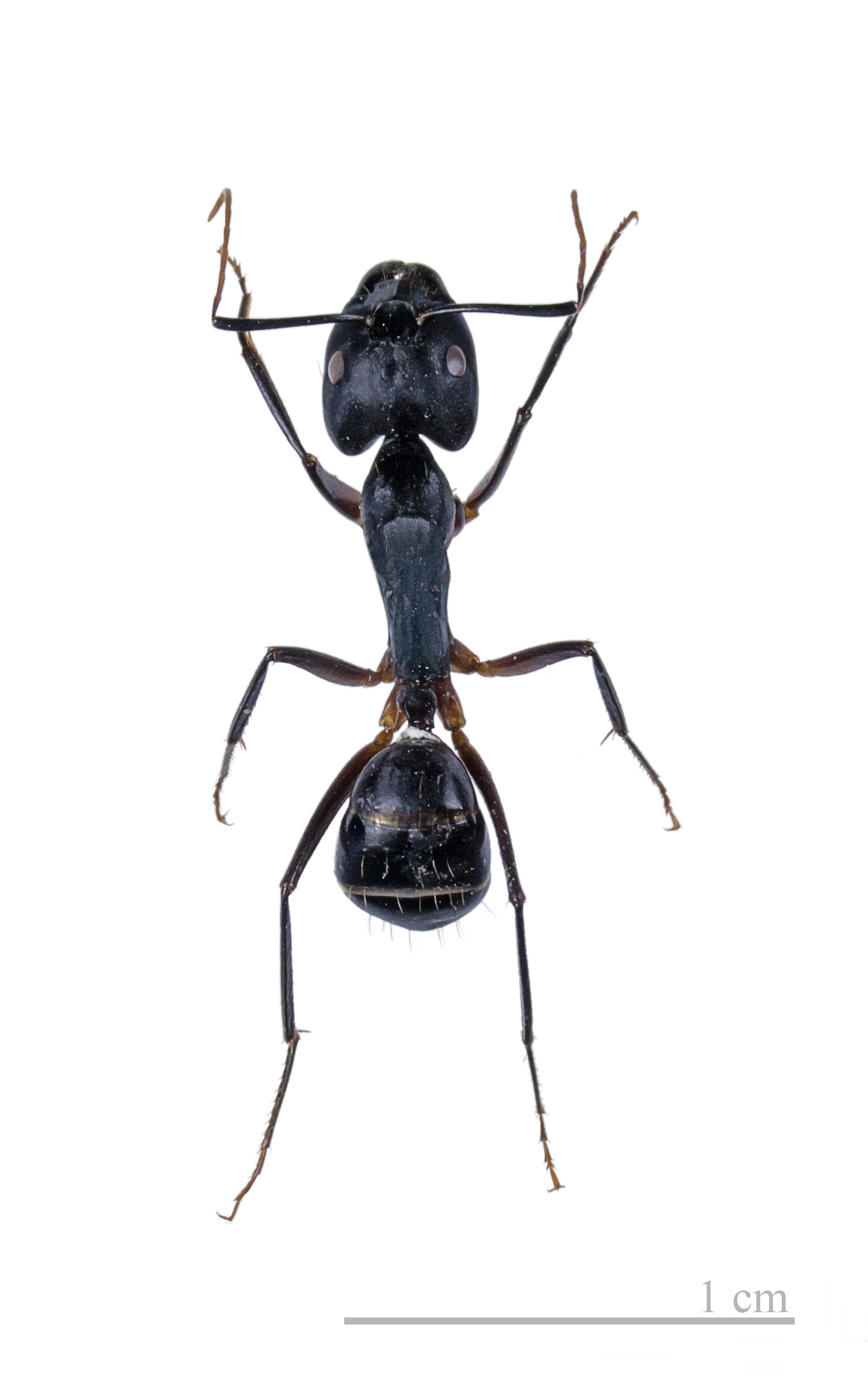
- Camponotus fellah

Scientific classification
- Kingdom: Animalia
- Phylum: Arthropoda
- Class: Insecta
- Order: Hymenoptera
- Family: Formicidae
- Clade: Doryloformicia
- Subfamily: Formicinae; Lepeletier, 1836

Type genus
- Formica Linnaeus, 1758

Diversity
- 51 extant genera in 12 tribes

= Formicinae =

Formicinae Temporal range: Turonian–Recent

Subfamily of ants

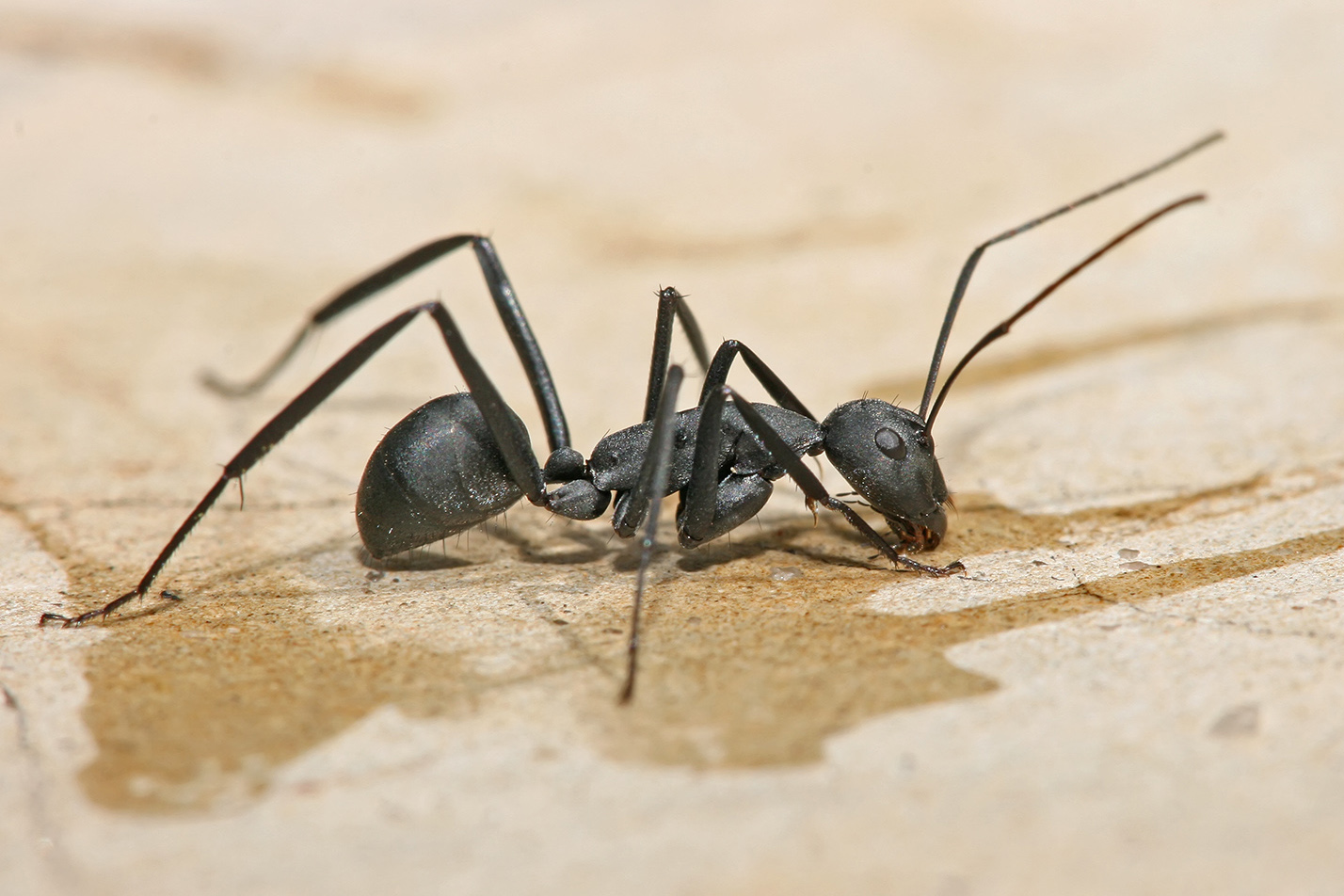
Carpenter ant (Camponotus sp.)

The Formicinae are a subfamily within the Formicidae family containing ants of moderate evolutionary development.

Formicines retain some primitive features, such as the presence of cocoons around pupae, the presence of ocelli in workers, and little tendency toward reduction of palp or antennal segmentation in most species, except subterranean groups. Extreme modification of mandibles is rare, except in the genera Myrmoteras and Polyergus. However, some members show considerable evolutionary advancement in behaviors such as slave-making and symbiosis with root-feeding hemipterans. Finally, all formicines have very reduced stings and enlarged venom reservoirs, with the venom gland, specialized (uniquely among ants) for the production of formic acid.

All members of the Formicinae "have a one-segmented petiole in the form of a vertical scale".

== Identification ==
Formicine ants have a single node-like or scale-like petiole (postpetiole entirely lacking) and the apex of the abdomen has a circular or U-shaped opening (the acidopore), usually fringed with hairs. A functional sting is absent, and defense is provided by the ejection of formic acid through the acidopore. If the acidopore is concealed by the pygidium and difficult to discern, then the antennal sockets are located well behind the posterior margin of the clypeus (cf. Dolichoderinae). In most formicines, the eyes are well developed (ocelli may also be present), the antennal insertions are not concealed by the frontal carinae, and the promesonotal suture is present and flexible.

== Tribes and genera ==
The tribal structure of the Formicinae is not completely understood. This list follows the scheme at AntCat, but other schemes and names are used.

- Camponotini Forel, 1878
  - Calomyrmex Emery, 1895
  - Camponotus Mayr, 1861
  - †Chimaeromyrma Dlussky, 1988
  - Colobopsis Mayr, 1861
  - Dinomyrmex Ashmead, 1905
  - Echinopla Smith, 1857
  - †Eocamponotus Boudinot, 2024
  - Lathidris Ward et al, 2025
  - Opisthopsis Dalla Torre, 1893
  - Overbeckia Viehmeyer, 1916
  - Polyrhachis Smith, 1857
  - Retalimyrma Ward et al, 2025
  - Uwari Ward et al, 2025
- Formicini Latreille, 1809
  - Alloformica Dlussky, 1969
  - †Asymphylomyrmex Wheeler, 1915
  - Bajcaridris Agosti, 1994
  - Cataglyphis Foerster, 1850
  - †Cataglyphoides Dlussky, 2008
  - †Conoformica Dlussky, 2008
  - Formica Linnaeus, 1758
  - †Glaphyromyrmex Wheeler, 1915
  - Iberoformica Tinaut, 1990
  - Polyergus Latreille, 1804
  - Proformica Ruzsky, 1902
  - †Protoformica Dlussky, 1967
  - Rossomyrmex Arnol'di, 1928
- Gesomyrmecini Ashmead, 1905
  - Gesomyrmex Mayr, 1868
  - †Prodimorphomyrmex Wheeler, 1915
  - †Sicilomyrmex Wheeler, 1915
- Gigantiopini Ashmead, 1905
  - Gigantiops Roger, 1863
- Lasiini Ashmead, 1905
  - Cladomyrma Wheeler, 1920
  - Euprenolepis Emery, 1906
  - Lasius Fabricius, 1804
  - Metalasius Boudinot et al., 2022
  - Myrmecocystus Wesmael, 1838
  - Nylanderia Emery, 1906
  - Paraparatrechina Donisthorpe, 1947
  - Paratrechina Motschoulsky, 1863
  - Prenolepis Mayr, 1861
  - Pseudolasius Emery, 1887
  - Zatania LaPolla et al., 2012
- Melophorini Forel, 1912
  - Lasiophanes Emery, 1895
  - Melophorus Lubbock, 1883
  - Myrmecorhynchus André, 1896
  - Notoncus Emery, 1895
  - Notostigma Emery, 1920
  - Prolasius Forel, 1892
  - Pseudonotoncus Clark, 1934
  - Stigmacros Forel, 1905
  - Teratomyrmex McAreavey, 1957
- Myrmelachistini
  - Brachymyrmex Mayr, 1868
  - Myrmelachista Roger, 1863
- Myrmoteratini Emery, 1895
  - Myrmoteras Forel, 1893
- Oecophyllini Emery, 1895
  - †Eoecophylla Archibald et al., 2024
  - Oecophylla Smith, 1860
- Plagiolepidini Forel, 1886
  - Acropyga Roger, 1862
  - Agraulomyrmex Prins, 1983
  - Anoplolepis Santschi, 1914
  - Aphomomyrmex Emery, 1899
  - Bregmatomyrma Wheeler, 1929
  - Lepisiota Santschi, 1926
  - Petalomyrmex Snelling, 1979
  - Plagiolepis Mayr, 1861
  - Tapinolepis Emery, 1925
- Santschiellini Forel, 1917
  - Santschiella Forel, 1916
- incertae sedis
  - †Attopsis Heer, 1850
  - †Estevia Fisher, 2025
  - †Leucotaphus Donisthorpe, 1920
  - †Liaoformica Hong, 2002
  - †Longiformica Hong, 2002
  - †Magnogasterites Hong, 2002
  - †Orbicapitia Hong, 2002
  - †Ovalicapito Hong, 2002
  - †Ovaligastrula Hong, 2002
  - †Protrechina Wilson, 1985
  - †Sinoformica Hong, 2002
  - †Sinotenuicapito Hong, 2002
