= List of ant genera =

Ants (family Formicidae in the order Hymenoptera) are the most species-rich of all social insects, with more than 12,000 described species and many others awaiting description. Formicidae is divided into 21 subfamilies, of which 17 are extant and four subfamilies are extinct, described from fossils. In total more than 300 genera have been described. Ants have come to occupy virtually all major terrestrial habitats, with the exception of tundra and cold ever-wet forests. They display a wide range of social behaviors, foraging habits and associations with other organisms, which has generated scientific and public interest.

The following is a list of worldwide ant genera organised by subfamily.

== Key ==
Genus name	The scientific name of the genus.
Binomial authority	The binomial authority—the person who first described the species using an available scientific name.
Classified	The year the genus was formally described and classified.
No. of species	The number of species, both extant and extinct, that are members of the genus.
Type species	The type species that was designated by the original author, unless noted otherwise. Extinct taxa are indicated by a †.
Example image	An image (if available) of a species who is a member of the genus.
References	Most citations provided are the first publications that describe the genus; additional citations are added if the original source does not contain all provided information.

== Subfamilies ==
=== Agroecomyrmecinae ===
The subfamily Agroecomyrmecinae represents two extant genera and two fossil genera, once widespread in both hemispheres during the early Tertiary. The subfamily was originally classified as Agroecomyrmecini, a Myrmicinae tribe until English myrmecologist Barry Bolton raised the tribe to subfamily status in 2003. Most specimens collected are from Central America and Mexico, although one type specimen of an Agroecomyrmecinae species was collected from Ghana.

Agroecomyrmecinae Carpenter, 1930
Genus name	Binomial authority	Classified	No. of species	Type species	Example image	Ref(s)
†Agroecomyrmex	Wheeler	1910	1	†Myrmica duisburgi	†Agroecomyrmex duisburgi	
Ankylomyrma	Bolton	1973	1	Ankylomyrma coronacantha	Ankylomyrma coronacantha	
†Eulithomyrmex	Carpenter	1935	2	†Lithomyrmex rugosus	†Eulithomyrmex rugosus	
Tatuidris	Brown & Kempf	1968	1	Tatuidris tatusia	Tatuidris tatusia	

=== Amblyoponinae ===
The subfamily Amblyoponinae represents nine extant genera and one fossil genus. Established by Swiss myrmecologist Auguste Forel in 1893, these ants are specialist predators, distributed worldwide in the tropics.

Subfamily Amblyoponinae Forel, 1893 – 10 genera, 146 species
Genus name	Binomial authority	Classified	No. of species	Type species	Example image	Ref(s)
Adetomyrma	Ward	1994	9	Adetomyrma venatrix	Adetomyrma venatrix	
Amblyopone	Erichson	1842	10	Amblyopone australis	Amblyopone australis	
†Casaleia	Pagliano & Scaramozzino	1990	4	†Protamblyopone inversa	†Casaleia eocenica	
Fulakora	Mann	1919	25	Stigmatomma celata	Fulakora celata	
Myopopone	Roger	1861	2	Myopopone maculata	Myopopone castanea	
Mystrium	Roger	1862	14	Mystrium mysticum	Mystrium mysticum	
Onychomyrmex	Emery	1895	4	Onychomyrmex hedleyi	Onychomyrmex hedleyi	
Prionopelta	Mayr	1866	22	Prionopelta punctulata	Prionopelta punctulata	
Stigmatomma	Roger	1859	54	Stigmatomma denticulatum	Stigmatomma denticulatum	
Xymmer	Santschi	1914	1	Stigmatomma muticum	Xymmer muticus	

=== Aneuretinae ===
The subfamily Aneuretinae represents one extant genus and eight fossil genera established by Italian entomologist Carlo Emery in 1913. Only a single species of this subfamily is extant, the Sri Lankan relict ant (Aneuretus simoni), endemic to Sri Lanka.

Subfamily Aneuretinae Emery, 1913 – nine genera, 12 species
Genus name	Binomial authority	Classified	No. of species	Type species	Example image	Ref(s)
†Aneuretellus	Dlussky	1988	1	†Aneuretellus deformis	—N/a	
Aneuretus	Emery	1893	1	Aneuretus simoni	Aneuretus simoni	
†Britaneuretus	Dlussky & Perfilieva	2014	1	†Britaneuretus anglicus	—N/a	
†Burmomyrma	Dlussky	1996	1	†Burmomyrma rossi	†Burmomyrma rossi	
†Cananeuretus	Engel & Grimaldi	2005	1	†Cananeuretus occidentalis	—N/a	
†Mianeuretus	Carpenter	1930	2	†Mianeuretus mirabilis	†Mianeuretus mirabilis	
†Paraneuretus	Wheeler	1915	3	†Paraneuretus tornquisti	†Paraneuretus tornquisti	
†Pityomyrmex	Wheeler	1915	1	†Pityomyrmex tornquisti	†Pityomyrmex tornquisti	
†Protaneuretus	Wheeler	1915	1	†Protaneuretus succineus	†Protaneuretus succineus	

=== Apomyrminae ===
The subfamily Apomyrminae contains the single genus Apomyrma which only has one species, the rare subterranean ant Apomyrma stygia from West Africa. Several undescribed species are known to exist, all from tropical Africa.

Subfamily Apomyrminae Dlussky & Fedoseeva, 1988 – one genus, one species
Genus name	Binomial authority	Classified	No. of species	Type species	Example image	Ref(s)
Apomyrma	Brown, Gotwald & Levieux	1970	1	Apomyrma stygia	Apomyrma stygia	

=== Brownimeciinae ===
The subfamily Brownimeciinae contains the single genus Brownimecia which only has one species, Brownimecia clavata. It was described in 1997 after a fossilised specimen was collected from Cretaceous amber from New Jersey, and was initially placed in the subfamily Ponerinae. The species was later classified into its own subfamily in 2003 by Barry Bolton.

Subfamily †Brownimeciinae Bolton, 2003 – one genus, one species
Genus name	Binomial authority	Classified	No. of species	Type species	Example image	Ref(s)
†Brownimecia	Grimaldi, Agosti & Carpenter	1997	1	†Brownimecia clavata	†Brownimecia clavata	

=== Dolichoderinae ===
The subfamily Dolichoderinae was established by Forel in 1878, which represents 28 extant genera and 20 fossil genera. The subfamily presents a great diversity of species throughout the world, mainly in the tropics. Most species are generalised scavengers, but some are predacious.

Subfamily Dolichoderinae Forel, 1878 – 48 genera, 843 species
Genus name	Binomial authority	Classified	No. of species	Type species	Example image	Ref(s)
†Alloiomma	Zhang	1989	2	†Alloiomma changweiensis	—N/a	
Anillidris	Santschi	1936	1	Anillidris bruchi	Anillidris bruchi	
Anonychomyrma	Donisthorpe	1947	26	Anonychomyrma myrmex	Anonychomyrma gilberti	
Aptinoma	Fisher	2009	2	Aptinoma mangabe	Aptinoma mangabe	
Arnoldius	Dubovikoff	2005	3	Bothriomyrmex flavus	Arnoldius flavus	
†Asymphylomyrmex	Wheeler	1915	1	†Asymphylomyrmex balticus	†Asymphylomyrmex balticus	
Axinidris	Weber	1941	21	Axinidris acholli	Axinidris acholli	
Azteca	Forel	1878	86	Liometopum xanthochroum	Azteca xanthochroum	
Bothriomyrmex	Emery	1869	24	Bothriomyrmex costae	Bothriomyrmex costae	
†Chronomyrmex	McKellar, Glasier & Engel	2013	1	†Chronomyrmex medicinehatensis	†Chronomyrmex medicinehatensis	
Chronoxenus	Santschi	1919	6	Bothriomyrmex myops	Chronoxenus myops	
†Ctenobethylus	Brues	1939	1	†Ctenobethylus succinalis	†Ctenobethylus goepperti	
Doleromyrma	Forel	1907	2	Tapinoma darwinianum	Doleromyrma darwiniana	
Dolichoderus	Lund	1831	181	Formica attelaboides	Dolichoderus attelaboides	
Dorymyrmex	Mayr	1866	60	Dorymyrmex flavescens	Dorymyrmex flavescens	
Ecphorella	Forel	1909	1	Tapinoma wellmani	Ecphorella wellmani	
†Elaeomyrmex	Carpenter	1930	2	†Elaeomyrmex gracilis	†Elaeomyrmex gracilis	
†Elaphrodites	Zhang	1989	2	†Elaphrodites scutulatus	—N/a	
†Eldermyrmex	Heterick & Shattuck	2011	1	†Iridomyrmex oblongiceps	†Eldermyrmex oblongiceps	
†Emplastus	Donisthorpe	1920	12	†Emplastus emeryi	†Emplastus britannicus	
†Eotapinoma	Dlussky	1988	3	†Eotapinoma gracilis	—N/a	
†Eurymyrmex	Zhang, Sun & Zhang	1994	1	†Eurymyrmex geologicus	—N/a	
Forelius	Emery	1888	18	Iridomyrmex mccooki	Forelius mccooki	
Froggattella	Forel	1902	2	Acantholepis kirbii	Froggattella kirbii	
Gracilidris	Wild & Cuezzo	2006	2	Gracilidris pombero	Gracilidris pombero	
Iridomyrmex	Mayr	1862	84	Formica detecta	Iridomyrmex purpureus	
†Kotshkorkia	Dlussky	1981	1	†Kotshkorkia laticeps	—N/a	
†Ktunaxia	Lapolla & Greenwalt	2015	1	†Ktunaxia jucunda	†Ktunaxia jucunda	
Leptomyrmex	Mayr	1862	29	Formica erythrocephala	Leptomyrmex erythrocephalus	
†Leptomyrmula	Emery	1913	1	†Leptomyrmula maravignae	†Leptomyrmula maravignae	
Linepithema	Mayr	1866	20	Linepithema fuscum	Linepithema fuscum	
Liometopum	Mayr	1861	28	Liometopum microcephalum	Liometopum microcephalum	
Loweriella	Shattuck	1992	1	Loweriella boltoni	Loweriella boltoni	
†Miomyrmex	Carpenter	1930	2	†Miomyrmex impactus	†Miomyrmex impactus	
Nebothriomyrmex	Dubovikov	2004	1	Nebothriomyrmex majeri	Nebothriomyrmex majeri	
Ochetellus	Shattuck	1992	7	Ochetellus glaber	Ochetellus glaber	
Papyrius	Shattuck	1992	2	Papyrius nitidus	Papyrius nitidus	
†Petraeomyrmex	Carpenter	1930	1	†Petraeomyrmex minimus	†Petraeomyrmex minimus	
Philidris	Shattuck	1992	9	Philidris cordata	Philidris cordata	
†Proiridomyrmex	Dlussky & Rasnitsyn	2003	2	†Proiridomyrmex vetulus	†Proiridomyrmex rotundatus	
†Protazteca	Carpenter	1930	5	†Protazteca elongata	†Protazteca elongata	
Ravavy	Fisher	2009	1	Ravavy miafina	Ravavy miafina	
Tapinoma	Förster	1850	74	Tapinoma erraticum	Tapinoma erraticum	
Technomyrmex	Mayr	1872	97	Technomyrmex strenuus	Technomyrmex strenuus	
Turneria	Forel	1895	8	Turneria bidentata	Turneria bidentata	
†Usomyrma	Dlussky et al.	2014	1	†Usomyrma mirabilis	†Usomyrma mirabilis	
†Yantaromyrmex	Dlussky & Dubovikoff	2013	5	†Yantaromyrmex geinitzi	†Yantaromyrmex geinitzi	
†Zherichinius	Dlussky	1988	2	†Zherichinius horribilis	†Zherichinius horribilis	

=== Dorylinae ===
The subfamily Dorylinae was established by Leach in 1815, which represents 27 extant genera and one fossil genus. Many species of ant in this subfamily are known as army ants that are distributed in the Old World and New World.

Subfamily Dorylinae Leach, 1815 – 28 genera, 693 species
Genus name	Binomial authority	Classified	No. of species	Type species	Example image	Ref(s)
Acanthostichus	Mayr	1887	24	Acanthostichus serratulus	Acanthostichus serratulus	
Aenictogiton	Emery	1901	7	Aenictogiton fossiceps	Aenictogiton fossiceps	
Aenictus	Shuckard	1840	184	Aenictus ambiguus	Aenictus ambiguus	
Cerapachys	Smith	1857	5	Cerapachys antennatus	Cerapachys antennatus	
Cheliomyrmex	Mayr	1870	4	Cheliomyrmex morosus	Cheliomyrmex morosus	
Chrysapace	Crawley	1924	3 (Note: Includes one undescribed fossil species.)	Chrysapace jacobsonii	Chrysapace jacobsonii	
Cylindromyrmex	Mayr	1870	13	Cylindromyrmex striatus	Cylindromyrmex striatus	
Dorylus	Fabricius	1793	60	Dorylus helvolus	Dorylus helvolus	
Eburopone	Borowiec	2016	1	Cerapachys wroughtoni	Eburopone wroughtoni	
Eciton	Latreille	1804	12	Eciton hamatum	Eciton hamatum	
Eusphinctus	Emery	1893	2	Eusphinctus furcatus	Eusphinctus furcatus	
Labidus	Jurine	1807	7	Labidus coecus	Labidus coecus	
Leptanilloides	Mann	1923	19	Leptanilloides biconstricta	Leptanilloides biconstricta	
Lioponera	Mayr	1879	73	Lioponera longitarsus	Lioponera longitarsus	
Lividopone	Bolton & Fisher	2016	1	Cerapachys lividus	Lividopone livida	
Neivamyrmex	Borgmeier	1940	128	Neivamyrmex nigrescens	Neivamyrmex nigrescens	
Neocerapachys	Borowiec	2016	2	Cerapachys neotropicus	Neocerapachys neotropicus	
Nomamyrmex	Borgmeier	1936	2	Nomamyrmex esenbeckii	Nomamyrmex esenbeckii	
Ooceraea	Roger	1862	11	Ooceraea fragosa	Ooceraea fragosa	
Parasyscia	Emery, in André	1882	50	Parasyscia piochardi	Parasyscia piochardi	
†Procerapachys	Wheeler	1915	3	†Procerapachys annosus	†Procerapachys annosus	
Simopone	Forel	1891	39	Simopone grandidieri	Simopone grandidieri	
Sphinctomyrmex	Mayr	1866	3	Sphinctomyrmex stali	Sphinctomyrmex stali	
Syscia	Roger	1861	5	Syscia typhla	Syscia typhla	
Tanipone	Bolton & Fisher	2012	10	Tanipone hirsuta	Tanipone hirsuta	
Vicinopone	Bolton & Fisher	2012	1	Vicinopone conciliatrix	Vicinopone conciliatrix	
Yunodorylus	Xu	2000	4	Yunodorylus sexspinus	Yunodorylus sexspinus	
Zasphinctus	Wheeler	1918	20	Sphinctomyrmex turneri	Zasphinctus turneri	

=== Ectatomminae ===
The subfamily Ectatomminae represents four extant genera and three fossil genera, established in 1895 by Carlo Emery. They are distributed in tropical and warm climates in the New World and Old World, as well as the Indo-Australian regions.

Subfamily Ectatomminae Emery, 1895 – seven genera, 278 species
Genus name	Binomial authority	Classified	No. of species	Type species	Example image	Ref(s)
†Canapone	Dlussky	1999	1	†Canapone dentata	—N/a	
Ectatomma	Smith	1858	16	Ectatomma tuberculatum	Ectatomma tuberculatum	
†Electroponera	Wheeler	1915	1	†Electroponera dubia	†Electroponera dubia	
Gnamptogenys	Roger	1863	143	Gnamptogenys sulcata	Gnamptogenys sulcata	
†Pseudectatomma	Dlussky & Wedman	2012	2	†Pseudectatomma eocenica	†Pseudectatomma eocenica	
Rhytidoponera	Mayr	1862	108	Rhytidoponera araneoides	Rhytidoponera araneoides	
Typhlomyrmex	Mayr	1862	7	Scyphodon anomalum	Scyphodon anomalum	

=== Formiciinae ===
The subfamily Formiciinae represents one extinct genus of ants dating back to the Eocene. (Note: †Formicium is considered a collective group name.) Ants of the genus Titanomyrma are the largest ants ever known, with queen specimens the size of small hummingbirds. Fossils have been collected from the state of Wyoming and in Germany.

Subfamily †Formiciinae Lutz, 1986 – one, six species
Genus name	Binomial authority	Classified	No. of species	Type species	Example image	Ref(s)
†Formicium	Westwood	1854	3	None (Note: The collective group names †Formicium and †Myrmeciites do not have designated type species per the International Code of Zoological Nomenclature.)	—N/a	
†Titanomyrma	Archibald, Johnson, Mathewes & Greenwood	2011	3	†Titanomyrma gigantea	†Titanomyrma gigantea	

=== Formicinae ===
The subfamily Formicinae represents 51 extant genera and 30 fossil genera that are globally distributed. Established by French zoologist Pierre André Latreille in 1809, the subfamily has more than 3,000 described species, placing it as the second largest ant subfamily. Despite this, the hyperdiverse genus Camponotus is the most diverse group of ants in the world, with more than 1,100 species described.

Subfamily Formicinae Latreille, 1809 – 82 genera, 3,243 species
Genus name	Binomial authority	Classified	No. of species	Type species	Example image	Ref(s)
Acropyga	Roger	1862	41	Acropyga acutiventris	Acropyga acutiventris	
Agraulomyrmex	Prins	1983	2	Agraulomyrmex meridionalis	Agraulomyrmex meridionalis	
Alloformica	Dlussky	1969	4	Alloformica aberrans	Alloformica aberrans	
Anoplolepis	Santschi	1914	9	Anoplolepis gracilipes	Anoplolepis gracilipes	
Aphomomyrmex	Emery	1899	1	Aphomomyrmex afer	Aphomomyrmex afer	
†Attopsis	Heer	1850	1	†Attopsis longipennis	Attopsis longipennis	
Bajcaridris	Agosti	1994	3	Bajcaridris theryi	Bajcaridris theryi	
Brachymyrmex	Mayr	1868	44	Brachymyrmex patagonicus	Brachymyrmex patagonicus	
Bregmatomyrma	Wheeler	1929	1	Bregmatomyrma carnosa	Bregmatomyrma carnosa	
Calomyrmex	Emery	1895	9	Calomyrmex laevissimus	Calomyrmex laevissimus	
†Camponotites	Steinbach	1967	5	†Camponotites silvestris	†Camponotites silvestris	
Camponotus	Mayr	1861	1131	Camponotus ligniperda	Camponotus ligniperda	
Cataglyphis	Förster	1850	91	Cataglyphis bicolor	Cataglyphis bicolor	
†Cataglyphoides	Dlussky	2008	2	†Cataglyphoides constrictus	†Cataglyphoides constrictus	
†Chimaeromyrma	Dlussky	1988	1	†Chimaeromyrma brachycephala	—N/a	
Cladomyrma	Wheeler	1920	13	Cladomyrma hewitti	Cladomyrma hewitti	
†Conoformica	Dlussky	2008	1	†Conoformica bitterfeldiana	—N/a	
†Curtipalpulus	Hong	2002	1	†Curtipalpulus eocenicus	—N/a	
Dinomyrmex	Ashmead	1905	1	Formica gigas	—N/a	
†Drymomyrmex	Wheeler	1915	2	†Drymomyrmex fuscipennis	†Drymomyrmex fuscipennis	
Echinopla	Smith	1857	33	Echinopla melanarctos	Echinopla melanarctos	
†Eoleptocerites	Hong	2002	2	†Eoleptocerites chinensis	—N/a	
Euprenolepis	Emery	1906	8	Euprenolepis procera	Euprenolepis procera	
†Eurytarsites	Hong	2002	1	†Eurytarsites fushunensisa	—N/a	
Formica	Linnaeus	1758	234	Formica rufa	Formica rufa	
†Fushuniformica	Hong	2002	1	†Fushuniformica spinata	—N/a	
Gesomyrmex	Mayr	1868	17	†Gesomyrmex hoernesi	†Gesomyrmex hoernesi	
Gigantiops	Roger	1863	1	Gigantiops destructor	Gigantiops destructor	
†Glaphyromyrmex	Wheeler	1915	1	†Glaphyromyrmex oligocenicus	†Glaphyromyrmex oligocenicus	
†Heeridris	Dlussky & Putyatina	2014	1	†Heeridris croaticus	—N/a	
†Huaxiaformica	Hong	2002	1	†Huaxiaformica mallepetiolata	—N/a	
Iberoformica	Tinaut	1990	2	Iberoformica subrufa	Iberoformica subrufa	
†Imhoffia	Heer	1850	2	†Imhoffia nigra	—N/a	
†Kyromyrma	Grimaldi & Agosti	2000	1	†Kyromyrma neffi	†Kyromyrma neffi	
Lasiophanes	Emery	1895	6	Lasiophanes atriventris	Lasiophanes atriventris	
Lasius	Fabricius	1804	134	†Formica nigra	†Formica nigra	
Lepisiota	Santschi	1926	81	Lepisiota rothneyi	Lepisiota rothneyi	
†Leptogasteritus	Hong	2002	1	†Leptogasteritus capricornutes	—N/a	
†Leucotaphus	Donisthorpe	1920	2	†Leucotaphus gurnetensiss	†Leucotaphus gurnetensiss	
†Liaoformica	Hong	2002	1	†Liaoformica longipetiolata	—N/a	
†Longiformica	Hong	2002	2	†Longiformica dongzhouheensis	—N/a	
†Magnogasterites	Hong	2002	1	†Magnogasterites curticornutus	—N/a	
Melophorus	Lubbock	1883	23	Melophorus bagoti	Melophorus bagoti	
Myrmecocystus	Wesmael	1838	29	Myrmecocystus mexicanus	Myrmecocystus mexicanus	
Myrmecorhynchus	André	1896	3	Myrmecorhynchus emeryi	Myrmecorhynchus emeryi	
Myrmelachista	Roger	1863	56	Myrmelachista kraatzii	Myrmelachista kraatzii	
Myrmoteras	Forel	1893	41	Myrmoteras binghamii	Myrmoteras binghamii	
Notoncus	Emery	1895	6	Notoncus ectatommoide	Notoncus ectatommoide	
Notostigma	Emery	1920	2	Notostigma carazzii	Notostigma carazzii	
Nylanderia	Emery	1906	110	Nylanderia vividula	Nylanderia vividula	
Oecophylla	Smith	1860	15	Oecophylla smaragdina	Oecophylla smaragdina	
Opisthopsis	Dalla Torre	1893	13	Myrmecopsis respiciens	Opisthopsis respiciens	
†Orbicapitia	Hong	2002	1	†Orbicapitia reticulata	—N/a	
†Ovalicapito	Hong	2002	1	†Ovalicapito fushunensis	—N/a	
†Ovaligastrula	Hong	2002	1	†Ovaligastrula xilutianensis	—N/a	
Overbeckia	Viehmeyer	1916	1	Overbeckia subclavata	Overbeckia subclavata	
Paraparatrechina	Donisthorpe	1947	36	Paratrechina pallida	Paraparatrechina pallida	
Paratrechina	Motschoulsky	1863	5	Paratrechina currens	Paratrechina longicornis	
Petalomyrmex	Snelling	1979	1	Petalomyrmex phylax	Petalomyrmex phylax	
Plagiolepis	Mayr	1861	72	Formica pygmaea	Plagiolepis pygmaea	
Polyergus	Latreille	1804	14	Formica rufescens	Polyergus rufescens	
Polyrhachis	Smith	1857	698	Formica bihamata	Polyrhachis bihamata	
Prenolepis	Mayr	1861	17	Tapinoma nitens	Prenolepis nitens	
†Prodimorphomyrmex	Wheeler	1915	1	†Prodimorphomyrmex primigenius	†Prodimorphomyrmex primigenius	
Proformica	Ruzsky	1902	25	Formica nasuta	Proformica nasuta	
Prolasius	Forel	1892	19	Formica advena	Prolasius advena	
†Protoformica	Dlussky	1967	1	†Formica proformicoides	—N/a	
†Protrechina	Wilson	1985	1	†Protrechina carpenteri	†Protrechina carpenteri	
†Pseudocamponotus	Carpenter	1930	1	†Pseudocamponotus elkoanus	†Pseudocamponotus elkoanus	
Pseudolasius	Emery	1887	50	Formica familiaris	Pseudolasius familiaris	
Pseudonotoncus	Clark	1934	2	Pseudonotoncus hirsutus	Pseudonotoncus hirsutus	
Rossomyrmex	Arnol'di	1928	4	Rossomyrmex proformicarum	Rossomyrmex proformicarum	
Santschiella	Forel	1916	1	Santschiella kohli	Santschiella kohli	
†Sicilomyrmex	Wheeler	1915	1	†Gesomyrmex corniger	†Sicilomyrmex corniger	
†Sinoformica	Hong	2002	1	†Sinoformica longicapitata	—N/a	
†Sinotenuicapito	Hong	2002	1	†Sinotenuicapito badis	—N/a	
Stigmacros	Forel	1905	49	Acantholepis froggatti	Stigmacros froggatti	
Tapinolepis	Emery	1925	14	Plagiolepis tumidula	Tapinolepis tumidula	
Teratomyrmex	McAreavey	1957	3	Teratomyrmex greavesi	Teratomyrmex greavesi	
†Wilsonia	Hong	2002	2	†Wilsonia megagastrosa	—N/a	
Zatania	LaPolla, Kallal & Brady	2012	6	Paratrechina cisipa	Zatania albimaculata	

=== Haidomyrmecinae ===
The subfamily Haidomyrmecinae contains 9 fossil genera of specialized ants described from Cretaceous ambers. The Subfamily was previously treated as the tribe Haidomyrmecini and placed within Sphecomyrminae. The tribe was elevated to a subfamily in 2020.

Haidomyrmecinae Bolton, 2003
Genus name	Genus authority	Described	No. of species	Type species	Image	Ref(s)
†Aquilomyrmex	Perrichot et al.	2020	1	†Aquilomyrmex huangi	Aquilomyrmex huangi	
†Ceratomyrmex	Perrichot, Wang & Engel	2016	1	†Ceratomyrmex ellenbergeri	†Ceratomyrmex ellenbergeri	
†Chonidris	Perrichot et al.	2020	1	†Chonidris insolita		
†Dhagnathos	Perrichot et al.	2020	1	†Dhagnathos autokrator		
†Haidomyrmex	Dlussky	1996	3	†Haidomyrmex cerberus	†Haidomyrmex cerberus	
†Haidomyrmodes	Perrichot et al.	2008	1	†Haidomyrmodes mammuthus	†Haidomyrmodes mammuthus	
†Haidoterminus	McKellar, Glasier & Engel	2013	1	†Haidoterminus cippus	†Haidoterminus cippus	
†Linguamyrmex	Barden & Grimaldi	2017	3	†Linguamyrmex vladi	†Linguamyrmex vladi	
†Protoceratomyrmex	Perrichot et al.	2020	1	†Protoceratomyrmex revelatus		

=== Heteroponerinae ===
The subfamily Heteroponerinae represents three extant genera of ants, established in 2003 when Barry Bolton divided the subfamily Ponerinae into six subfamilies. These ants are known from the Neotropics of Central America and South America while Aulacopone relicta is from Azerbaijan.

Subfamily Heteroponerinae Bolton, 2003 – three genera, 33 species
Genus name	Binomial authority	Classified	No. of species	Type species	Example image	Ref(s)
Acanthoponera	Mayr	1862	4	Acanthoponera mucronata	Acanthoponera mucronata	
Aulacopone	Arnol'di	1930	1	Aulacopone relicta	Aulacopone relicta	
Heteroponera	Mayr	1887	28	Heteroponera carinifrons	Heteroponera carinifrons	

=== Leptanillinae ===
The subfamily Leptanillinae represents nine extant genera of ants, established in 1910 by Carlo Emery. They are subterranean ants from Africa, Europe and a single species known from Australia. Studies about their biology is minimal.

Subfamily Leptanillinae Emery, 1910 – nine genera, 64 species
Genus name	Binomial authority	Classified	No. of species	Type species	Example image	Ref(s)
Anomalomyrma	Bolton	1990	3	Anomalomyrma taylori	Anomalomyrma taylori	
Furcotanilla	Xu	2012	1	Furcotanilla furcomandibula	—N/a	
Leptanilla	Emery	1870	45	Leptanilla revelierii	Leptanilla revelierii	
Noonilla	Petersen	1968	1	Noonilla copiosa	Noonilla copiosa	
Opamyrma	Yamane, Bui & Eguchi	2008	1	Opamyrma hungvuong	Opamyrma hungvuong	
Phaulomyrma	Wheeler & Wheeler	1930	1	Phaulomyrma javana	Phaulomyrma javana	
Protanilla	Taylor	1990	9	Protanilla rafflesi	Protanilla rafflesi	
Scyphodon	Brues	1925	1	Scyphodon anomalum	Scyphodon anomalum	
Yavnella	Kugler	1987	2	Yavnella argamani	Yavnella argamani	

=== Martialinae ===
The subfamily Martialinae contains the single genus Martialis which only has one species, Martialis heureka. The ant was discovered in 2000 Amazon rainforest near Manaus, Brazil. Described in 2008, the ant belongs to the oldest known distinct lineage to have diverged from the ancestors of all other ants.

Subfamily Martialinae Rabeling & Verhaagh, 2008 – one genus, one species
Genus name	Binomial authority	Classified	No. of species	Type species	Example image	Ref(s)
Martialis	Rabeling & Verhaagh	2008	1	Martialis heureka	Martialis heureka	

=== Myrmeciinae ===
The subfamily Myrmeciinae represents two extant genera and five fossil genera that were once found worldwide. (Note: †Myrmeciites is considered a collective group name.) Established by Carlo Emery in 1877, the extant genera are restricted to Australia, New Caledonia and New Zealand. The notorious ant genus Myrmecia is known for their venomous stings and aggression, which has caused several human deaths in sensitive people.

Subfamily Myrmeciinae Emery, 1877 – seven genera, 111 species
Genus name	Binomial authority	Classified	No. of species	Type species	Example image	Ref(s)
†Archimyrmex	Cockerell	1923	4	†Archimyrmex rostratus	†Archimyrmex rostratus	
†Avitomyrmex	Archibald, Cover & Moreau	2006	3	†Avitomyrmex mastax	—N/a	
†Macabeemyrma	Archibald, Cover & Moreau	2006	1	†Macabeemyrma ovata	†Macabeemyrma ovata	
Myrmecia	Fabricius	1804	95	Myrmecia gulosa	Myrmecia gulosa	
†Myrmeciites	Archibald, Cover & Moreau	2006	0	None	†Myrmeciites "incertae sedis"	
Nothomyrmecia	Clark	1934	1	Nothomyrmecia macrops	Nothomyrmecia macrops	
†Prionomyrmex	Mayr	1868	3	†Prionomyrmex longiceps	†Prionomyrmex longiceps	
†Ypresiomyrma	Archibald, Cover & Moreau	2006	4	†Ypresiomyrma orbiculata	†Ypresiomyrma orbiculata	

=== Myrmicinae ===
The subfamily Myrmicinae was established by Lepeletier de Saint-Fargeau in 1835. It represents 142 extant genera and 36 fossil genera that are distributed globally. It is the largest subfamily of the Formicidae, with more than 6,758 species described. The seed-harvesting ants and fungus-growing ants are well known among the Myrmicines.

Subfamily Myrmicinae Lepeletier de Saint-Fargeau, 1835 – 178 genera, 6,758 species
Genus name	Binomial authority	Classified	No. of species	Type species	Example image	Ref(s)
Acanthognathus	Mayr	1887	8	Acanthognathus ocellatus	Acanthognathus ocellatus	
Acanthomyrmex	Emery	1893	17	Acanthomyrmex luciolae	Acanthomyrmex concavus	
Acromyrmex	Mayr	1865	32	Formica hystrix	Acromyrmex balzani	
Adelomyrmex	Emery	1897	30	Adelomyrmex biroi	Adelomyrmex biroi	
Adlerzia	Forel	1902	1	Monomorium froggatti	Adlerzia froggatti	
†Afromyrma	Dlussky, Brothers & Rasnitsyn	2004	1	†Afromyrma petrosa	—N/a	
†Agastomyrma	Dlussky, Rasnitsyn & Perfilieva	2015	1	†Agastomyrma laticeps	—N/a	
Allomerus	Mayr	1878	8	Allomerus decemarticulatus	Allomerus decemarticulatus	
Ancyridris	Wheeler	1935	2	Ancyridris polyrhachioides	Ancyridris polyrhachioides	
Anillomyrma	Emery	1913	2	Monomorium decamerum	Anillomyrma decamera	
Aphaenogaster	Mayr	1853	204	Aphaenogaster sardoa	Aphaenogaster swammerdami	
Apterostigma	Mayr	1865	47	Apterostigma pilosum	Apterostigma pilosum	
Aretidris	General	2015	2	Aretidris buenaventei	Aretidris buenaventei	
Atopomyrmex	André	1889	3	Atopomyrmex mocquerysi	Atopomyrmex mocquerysi	
Atta	Fabricius	1804	17	Formica cephalotes	Atta cephalotes	
†Attaichnus	Laza	1982	1	None	—N/a	
Austromorium	Shattuck	2009	2	Xiphomyrmex flavigaster	Austromorium flavigaster	
Baracidris	Bolton	1981	3	Baracidris meketra	Baracidris sitra	
Bariamyrma	Lattke	1990	1	Bariamyrma hispidula	Bariamyrma hispidula	
Basiceros	Schulz	1906	8	Meranoplus singularis	Basiceros manni	
†Biamomyrma	Dlussky, Rasnitsyn & Perfilieva	2015	3	†Biamomyrma zherikhini	—N/a	
†Bilobomyrma	Radchenko & Dlussky	2013	2	†Bilobomyrma ukrainica	—N/a	
Blepharidatta	Wheeler	1915	4	Blepharidatta brasiliensis	Blepharidatta brasiliensis	
†Boltonidris	Radchenko & Dlussky	2012	1	†Boltonidris mirabilis	—N/a	
Bondroitia	Forel	1911	2	Monomorium coecum	Bondroitia lujae	
†Brachytarsites	Hong	2002	1	†Brachytarsites dongzhouheensis	—N/a	
Calyptomyrmex	Emery	1887	37	Calyptomyrmex beccarii	Calyptomyrmex beccarii	
Cardiocondyla	Emery	1869	70	Cardiocondyla elegans	Cardiocondyla wroughtonii	
Carebara	Westwood	1840	212	Carebara lignata	Carebara longii	
Cataulacus	Smith	1853	68	Cataulacus taprobanae	Cataulacus oberthueri	
†Cephalomyrmex	Carpenter	1930	1	†Cephalomyrmex rotundatus	†Cephalomyrmex rotundatus	
Cephalotes	Latreille	1802	135	Formica atrata	Cephalotes atratus	
Chimaeridris	Wilson	1989	2	Chimaeridris boltoni	Chimaeridris boltoni	
†Clavipetiola	Hong	2002	1	†Clavipetiola asiatica	—N/a	
Colobostruma	Wheeler	1927	16	Epopostruma leae	Colobostruma foliacea	
Crematogaster	Lund	1831	496	Formica scutellaris	Crematogaster scutellaris	
Cryptomyrmex	Fernández	2004	2	Adelomyrmex longinodus	Cryptomyrmex longinodus	
Cyatta	Sosa-Calvo et al.	2013	1	Cyatta abscondita	Cyatta abscondita	
Cyphoidris	Weber	1952	4	Cyphoidris spinosa	Cyphoidris spinosa	
Cyphomyrmex	Mayr	1862	41	Cyphomyrmex minutus	Cyphomyrmex minutus	
Dacatria	Rigato	1994	1	Dacatria templaris	Dacatria templaris	
Dacetinops	Brown & Wilson	1957	7	Dacetinops cibdelus	Dacetinops cibdelus	
Daceton	Perty	1833	2	Formica armigera	Daceton armigerum	
Diaphoromyrma	Fernández, Delabie & Nascimento	2009	1	Diaphoromyrma sofiae	Diaphoromyrma sofiae	
Dicroaspis	Emery	1908	2	Dicroaspis cryptocera	Dicroaspis cryptocera	
Dilobocondyla	Santschi	1910	19	Atopomyrmex selebensis	Dilobocondyla fouqueti	
Diplomorium	Mayr	1901	1	Diplomorium longipenne	Diplomorium longipenne	
Dolopomyrmex	Cover & Deyrup	2007	1	Dolopomyrmex pilatus	Dolopomyrmex pilatus	
†Electromyrmex	Wheeler	1910	1	†Electromyrmex klebsi	†Electromyrmex klebsi	
†Enneamerus	Mayr	1868	1	†Enneamerus reticulatus	†Enneamerus reticulatus	
†Eocenidris	Wilson	1985	1	†Eocenidris crassa	†Eocenidris crassa	
†Eocenomyrma	Dlussky & Radchenko	2006	4	†Eocenomyrma orthospina	†Eocenomyrma orthospina	
†Eomyrmex	Hong	1974	1	†Eomyrmex guchengziensis	—N/a	
Epelysidris	Bolton	1987	1	Epelysidris brocha	Epelysidris brocha	
Epopostruma	Forel	1895	19	Strumigenys quadrispinosa	Epopostruma natalae	
Eurhopalothrix	Brown & Kempf	1961	53	Rhopalothrix bolaui	Eurhopalothrix bolaui	
Eutetramorium	Emery	1899	3	Eutetramorium mocquerysi	Eutetramorium mocquerysi	
†Fallomyrma	Dlussky & Radchenko	2006	1	†Fallomyrma transversa	—N/a	
Formicoxenus	Mayr	1855	7	Myrmica nitidula	Formicoxenus nitidulus	
Formosimyrma	Terayama	2009	1	Formosimyrma lanuyensis	Formosimyrma lanuyensis	
†Fushunomyrmex	Hong	2002	1	†Fushunomyrmex liaoningensis	—N/a	
Gaoligongidris	Xu	2012	1	Gaoligongidris planodorsa	—N/a	
Gauromyrmex	Menozzi	1933	2	Gauromyrmex bengakalisi	Gauromyrmex bengakalisi	
Goniomma	Emery	1895	8	Aphaenogaster blanci	Goniomma collingwoodi	
Harpagoxenus	Forel	1893	3	Myrmica sublaevis	Harpagoxenus sublaevis	
Huberia	Forel	1890	2	Tetramorium striatum	Huberia striata	
Hylomyrma	Forel	1912	13	Pogonomyrmex columbicus	Hylomyrma balzani	
†Hypopomyrmex	Emery	1891	1	†Hypopomyrmex bombiccii	†Hypopomyrmex bombiccii	
†Ilemomyrmex	Wilson	1985	1	†Ilemomyrmex caecus	†Ilemomyrmex caecus	
Indomyrma	Brown	1986	2	Indomyrma dasypyx	Indomyrma dasypyx	
Ishakidris	Bolton	1984	1	Ishakidris ascitaspis	Ishakidris ascitaspis	
Kalathomyrmex	Klingenberg & Brandão	2009	1	Myrmicocrypta emeryi	Kalathomyrmex emeryi	
Kartidris	Bolton	1991	6	Kartidris nyos	Kartidris nyos	
Kempfidris	Fernández, Feitosa & Lattke	2014	1	Monomorium inusuale	Kempfidris inusualis	
Lachnomyrmex	Wheeler	1910	16	Lachnomyrmex scrobiculatus	Lachnomyrmex scrobiculatus	
Lasiomyrma	Terayama & Yamane	2000	4	Lasiomyrma gedensis	Lasiomyrma gedensis	
Lenomyrmex	Fernández & Palacio	1999	6	Lenomyrmex mandibularis	Lenomyrmex colwelli	
Leptothorax	Mayr	1855	19	Formica acervorum	Leptothorax acervorum	
Liomyrmex	Mayr	1865	1	Myrmica caeca	Liomyrmex gestroi	
†Lonchomyrmex	Mayr	1867	2	†Lonchomyrmex freyeri	—N/a	
Lophomyrmex	Emery	1892	13	Oecodoma quadrispinosa	Lophomyrmex longicornis	
Lordomyrma	Emery	1897	34	Lordomyrma furcifera	Lordomyrma furcifera	
Malagidris	Bolton & Fisher	2014	6	Aphaenogaster belti	Malagidris belti	
Manica	Jurine	1807	6	Formica rubida	Manica rubida	
Mayriella	Forel	1902	9	Mayriella abstinens	Mayriella abstinens	
Megalomyrmex	Forel	1885	44	Megalomyrmex leoninus	Megalomyrmex leoninus	
Melissotarsus	Emery	1877	4	Melissotarsus beccarii	Melissotarsus beccarii	
Meranoplus	Smith	1853	90	Cryptocerus bicolor	Meranoplus bicolor	
Mesostruma	Brown	1948	9	Strumigenys turneri	Mesostruma turneri	
Messor	Forel	1890	110	Formica barbara	Messor barbarus	
Metapone	Forel	1911	18	Metapone greeni	Metapone emersoni	
Microdaceton	Santschi	1913	4	Microdaceton exornatum	Microdaceton exornatum	
†Miosolenopsis	Zhang	1989	1	†Miosolenopsis fossilis	—N/a	
Monomorium	Mayr	1855	372	Monomorium monomorium	Monomorium pharaonis	
Mycetagroicus	Brandão & Mayhé-Nunes	2001	4	Mycetagroicus cerradensis	Mycetagroicus cerradensis	
Mycetarotes	Emery	1913	4	Cyphomyrmex parallelus	Mycetarotes parallelus	
Mycetophylax	Emery	1913	3	Myrmicocrypta brittoni	Mycetophylax conformis	
Mycetosoritis	Wheeler	1907	5	Atta hartmanni	Mycetosoritis hartmanni	
Mycocepurus	Forel	1893	6	Atta smithii	Mycocepurus smithii	
Myrmecina	Curtis	1829	51	Myrmecina latreillii	Myrmecina graminicola	
†Myrmecites	Dlussky & Rasnitsyn	2003	6	†Myrmecites rotundiceps	—N/a	
Myrmica	Latreille	1804	211	Formica rubra	Myrmica rubra	
Myrmicaria	Saunders	1842	32	Myrmicaria brunnea	Myrmicaria brunnea	
Myrmicocrypta	Smith	1860	27	Myrmicocrypta squamosa	Myrmicocrypta squamosa	
Myrmisaraka	Bolton & Fisher	2014	2	Myrmisaraka producta	Myrmisaraka producta	
Nesomyrmex	Wheeler	1910	57	Nesomyrmex clavipilis	Nesomyrmex angulatus	
Novomessor	Emery	1915	3	Aphaenogaster cockerelli	Novomessor cockerelli	
Ochetomyrmex	Mayr	1878	2	Ochetomyrmex semipolitus	Ochetomyrmex semipolitus	
Octostruma	Forel	1912	34	Rhopalothrix simoni	Octostruma iheringi	
Ocymyrmex	Emery	1886	37	Ocymyrmex barbiger	Ocymyrmex dekerus	
†Orbigastrula	Hong	2002	1	†Orbigastrula guchengziensis	—N/a	
Orectognathus	Smith	1853	29	Orectognathus antennatus	Orectognathus antennatus	
Oxyepoecus	Santschi	1926	21	Oxyepoecus bruchi	Oxyepoecus bruchi	
†Oxyidris	Wilson	1985	1	†Oxyidris antillana	†Oxyidris antillana	
Oxyopomyrmex	André	1881	12	Oxyopomyrmex oculatus	Oxyopomyrmex oculatus	
†Parameranoplus	Wheeler	1915	1	†Parameranoplus primaevus	†Parameranoplus primaevus	
Paramycetophylax	Kusnezov	1956	1	Sericomyrmex bruchi	Paramycetophylax bruchi	
†Paraphaenogaster	Dlussky	1981	4	†Paraphaenogaster microphthalmus	†Paraphaenogaster hooleyana	
Paratopula	Wheeler	1919	11	Atopomyrmex ceylonicus	Paratopula macta	
Patagonomyrmex	Johnson & Moreau	2016	3	Pogonomyrmex angustus	Patagonomyrmex angustus	
Perissomyrmex	Smith	1947	6	Perissomyrmex snyderi	Perissomyrmex snyderi	
Peronomyrmex	Viehmeyer	1922	3	Peronomyrmex overbecki	Peronomyrmex greavesi	
Phalacromyrmex	Kempf	1960	1	Phalacromyrmex fugax	Phalacromyrmex fugax	
Pheidole	Westwood	1839	1007	Atta providens	Pheidole rhea	
Pilotrochus	Brown	1978	1	Pilotrochus besmerus	Pilotrochus besmerus	
†Plesiomyrmex	Dlussky & Radchenko	2009	1	†Plesiomyrmex tubulatus	—N/a	
Podomyrma	Smith	1859	52	Podomyrma femorata	Podomyrma minor	
Poecilomyrma	Mann	1921	2	Poecilomyrma senirewae	Poecilomyrma senirewae	
Pogonomyrmex	Mayr	1868	69	Formica badia	Camponotus badius	
Pristomyrmex	Mayr	1866	60	Pristomyrmex pungens	Pristomyrmex punctatus	
Proatta	Forel	1912	1	Proatta butteli	Proatta butteli	
Procryptocerus	Emery	1887	45	Meranoplus striatus	Procryptocerus hylaeus	
Propodilobus	Branstetter	2009	1	Stenamma orientale	Propodilobus orientale	
Protalaridris	Brown	1980	1	Protalaridris armata	Protalaridris armata	
†Protomyrmica	Dlussky & Radchenko	2009	1	†Protomyrmica atavia	†Protomyrmica atavia	
Pseudoatta	Gallardo	1916	1	Pseudoatta argentina	Pseudoatta argentina	
†Quadrulicapito	Hong	2002	1	†Quadrulicapito longa	—N/a	
†Quineangulicapito	Hong	2002	1	†Quineangulicapito fushunensis	—N/a	
Recurvidris	Bolton	1992	11	None	Recurvidris recurvispinosa	
Rhopalomastix	Forel	1900	6	Rhopalomastix rothneyi	Rhopalomastix rothneyi	
Rhopalothrix	Mayr	1870	16	Rhopalothrix ciliata	Rhopalothrix ciliata	
Rogeria	Emery	1894	40	Rogeria curvipubens	Rogeria curvipubens	
Romblonella	Wheeler	1935	9	Romblonella grandinodis	Romblonella opaca	
Rostromyrmex	Rosciszewski	1994	1	Rostromyrmex pasohensis	Rostromyrmex pasohensis	
Rotastruma	Bolton	1991	2	Rotastruma recava	Rotastruma recava	
Royidris	Bolton & Fisher	2014	15	Monomorium robertsoni	Royidris robertsoni	
Secostruma	Bolton	1988	1	Secostruma lethifera	Secostruma lethifera	
Sericomyrmex	Mayr	1865	19	Sericomyrmex opacus	Sericomyrmex amabilis	
†Sinomyrmex	Hong	2002	2	†Sinomyrmex brunneus	—N/a	
Solenopsis	Westwood	1840	205	Solenopsis mandibularis	Solenopsis geminata	
†Solenopsites	Dlussky & Rasnitsyn	2003	3	†Solenopsites minutus	†Solenopsites rossi	
†Sphaerogasterites	Hong	2002	1	†Sphaerogasterites longipetiolatus	—N/a	
Stegomyrmex	Emery	1912	5	Stegomyrmex connectens	Stegomyrmex vizottoi	
Stenamma	Westwood	1839	85	Stenamma westwoodii	Stenamma westwoodii	
Stereomyrmex	Emery	1901	3	Stereomyrmex horni	Stereomyrmex horni	
†Stigmomyrmex	Mayr	1868	1	†Stigmomyrmex venustus	†Stigmomyrmex venustus	
†Stiphromyrmex	Wheeler	1915	1	†Stiphromyrmex robustus	†Stiphromyrmex robustus	
Strongylognathus	Mayr	1853	24	Eciton testaceum	Strongylognathus testaceus	
Strumigenys	Smith	1860	842	Strumigenys mandibularis	Strumigenys abdera	
Syllophopsis	Santschi	1915	20	Monomorium modestum	Syllophopsis modesta	
Talaridris	Weber	1941	1	Talaridris mandibularis	Talaridris mandibularis	
Temnothorax	Mayr	1861	395	Myrmica recedens	Temnothorax unifasciatus	
Terataner	Emery	1912	12	Atopomyrmex foreli	Terataner foreli	
Tetheamyrma	Bolton	1991	1	Tetheamyrma subspongia	Tetheamyrma subspongia	
Tetramorium	Mayr	1855	569	Formica caespitum	Tetramorium caespitum	
Trachymyrmex	Forel	1893	48	Atta septentrionalis	Trachymyrmex septentrionalis	
Tranopelta	Mayr	1866	2	Tranopelta gilva	Tranopelta gilva	
Trichomyrmex	Mayr	1865	18	Trichomyrmex rogeri	Trichomyrmex destructor	
Tropidomyrmex	Silva, Feitosa, Brandão & Diniz	2009	1	Tropidomyrmex elianae	Tropidomyrmex elianae	
Tyrannomyrmex	Fernández	2003	3	Tyrannomyrmex rex	Tyrannomyrmex dux	
Veromessor	Forel	1917	9	Aphaenogaster andrei	Veromessor andrei	
Vitsika	Bolton & Fisher	2014	14	Vitsika crebra	Vitsika crebra	
Vollenhovia	Mayr	1865	62	Vollenhovia punctatostriata	Vollenhovia emeryi	
Vombisidris	Bolton	1991	17	Vombisidris philax	Vombisidris philax	
Wasmannia	Forel	1893	11	Tetramorium auropunctatum	Wasmannia auropunctata	
†Wumyrmex	Hong	2002	1	†Wumyrmex furvis	—N/a	
Xenomyrmex	Forel	1885	4	Xenomyrmex stollii	Xenomyrmex stollii	
†Zhangidris	Bolton	2003	1	†Heteromyrmex atopogaster	—N/a	

=== Paraponerinae ===
The subfamily Paraponerinae contains a single genus Paraponera. This genus has two species, one of which was found in Dominican amber from the Miocene. The extant species, Paraponera clavata, is found in Central America and South America, and the pain from its sting is said to be greater than any other insect sting on earth.

Subfamily Paraponerinae Emery, 1901 – one genus, two species
Genus name	Binomial authority	Classified	No. of species	Type species	Example image	Ref(s)
Paraponera	Smith	1858	2	Paraponera clavata	Paraponera clavata	

=== Ponerinae ===
The subfamily Ponerinae was established by Lepeletier de Saint-Fargeau in 1835, which represents 47 extant genera and 12 fossil genera. The subfamily is among the most diverse in the family Formicidae, with more than 1,000 species described. They are mostly distributed in the tropics and subtropics.

Subfamily Ponerinae Lepeletier de Saint-Fargeau, 1835 – 59 genera, 1,287 species
Genus name	Binomial authority	Classified	No. of species	Type species	Example image	Ref(s)
†Afropone	Dlussky et al.	2004	2	Afropone oculata	—N/a	
Anochetus	Mayr	1861	122	Anochetus ghilianii	Anochetus ghilianii	
†Archiponera	Carpenter	1930	1	†Archiponera wheeleri	†Archiponera wheeleri	
Asphinctopone	Santschi	1914	3	Asphinctopone silvestrii	Asphinctopone silvestrii	
Austroponera	Schmidt & Shattuck	2014	3	Austroponera rufonigra	Austroponera rufonigra	
Belonopelta	Mayr	1870	2	Belonopelta attenuata	Belonopelta attenuata	
Boloponera	Fisher	2006	1	Boloponera vicans	Boloponera vicans	
Bothroponera	Mayr	1862	37	Bothroponera pumicosa	Bothroponera pumicosa	
Brachyponera	Emery	1900	19	Brachyponera croceicornis	Brachyponera croceicornis	
Buniapone	Schmidt & Shattuck, 2014	2014	1	Buniapone amblyops	Buniapone amblyops	
Centromyrmex	Mayr	1866	15	Centromyrmex bohemanni	Centromyrmex bohemanni	
†Cephalopone	Dlussky & Wedmann	2012	2	†Cephalopone potens	†Cephalopone potens	
Cryptopone	Emery	1893	24	Cryptopone testacea	Cryptopone testacea	
†Cyrtopone	Dlussky & Wedmann	2012	4	†Cyrtopone microcephala	†Cyrtopone microcephala	
Diacamma	Mayr	1862	24	Diacamma rugosum	Diacamma rugosum	
Dinoponera	Roger	1861	8	Dinoponera gigantea	Dinoponera gigantea	
Dolioponera	Brown	1974	1	Dolioponera fustigera	Dolioponera fustigera	
Ectomomyrmex	Mayr	1867	28	Ectomomyrmex javanus	Ectomomyrmex javanus	
Emeryopone	Forel	1912	5	Emeryopone buttelreepeni	Emeryopone buttelreepeni	
†Eogorgites	Hong	2002	1	†Eogorgites cingulatus	—N/a	
†Eoponerites	Hong	2002	1	†Eoponerites longipetiolatus	—N/a	
Euponera	Forel	1891	27	Euponera sikorae	Euponera sikorae	
Feroponera	Bolton & Fisher	2008	1	Feroponera ferox	Feroponera ferox	
Fisheropone	Schmidt & Shattuck	2014	1	Fisheropone ambigua	Fisheropone ambigua	
†Furcisutura	Hong	2002	1	†Furcisutura wanghuacunensis	—N/a	
Hagensia	Forel	1901	2	Hagensia havilandi	Hagensia havilandi	
Harpegnathos	Jerdon	1851	7	Harpegnathos saltator	Harpegnathos saltator	
Hypoponera	Santschi	1938	154	Hypoponera abeillei	Hypoponera abeillei	
Iroponera	Schmidt & Shattuck	2014	1	Iroponera odax	Iroponera odax	
Leptogenys	Roger	1861	308	Leptogenys falcigera	Leptogenys falcigera	
Loboponera	Bolton & Brown	2002	9	Loboponera vigilans	Loboponera vigilans	
†Longicapitia	Hong	2002	1	†Longicapitia reticulata	—N/a	
Mayaponera	Schmidt & Shattuck	2014	1	Mayaponera constricta	Mayaponera constricta	
Megaponera	Mayr	1862	1	Megaponera analis	Megaponera analis	
Mesoponera	Emery	1900	20	Mesoponera melanaria	Mesoponera melanaria	
†Messelepone	Dlussky & Wedmann	2012	1	†Messelepone leptogenoides	†Messelepone leptogenoides	
Myopias	Roger	1861	40	Myopias amblyops	Myopias amblyops	
Neoponera	Emery	1901	57	Neoponera villosa	Neoponera villosa	
Odontomachus	Latreille	1804	70	Odontomachus haematodus	Odontomachus haematodus	
Odontoponera	Mayr	1862	2	Odontoponera denticulata	Odontoponera denticulata	
Ophthalmopone	Forel	1890	5	Ophthalmopone berthoudi	Ophthalmopone berthoudi	
Pachycondyla	Smith	1858	36	Pachycondyla crassinoda	Pachycondyla crassinoda	
Paltothyreus	Mayr	1862	1	Paltothyreus tarsatus	Paltothyreus tarsatus	
Parvaponera	Schmidt & Shattuck	2014	4	Parvaponera darwinii	Parvaponera darwinii	
Phrynoponera	Wheeler	1920	5	Phrynoponera gabonensis	Phrynoponera gabonensis	
Platythyrea	Roger	1863	44	Platythyrea punctata	Platythyrea punctata	
Plectroctena	Smith	1858	17	Plectroctena mandibularis	Plectroctena mandibularis	
Ponera	Latreille	1804	62	Ponera coarctata	Ponera coarctata	
†Ponerites	Dlussky & Rasnitsyn	2003	14	†Ponerites kishenehne	†Ponerites eocenicus	
Promyopias	Santschi	1914	1	Promyopias silvestrii	Promyopias silvestrii	
†Protopone	Dlussky	1988	7	†Protopone primigena	†Protopone primigena	
Psalidomyrmex	André	1890	6	Psalidomyrmex foveolatus	Psalidomyrmex foveolatus	
Pseudoneoponera	Donisthorpe	1943	18	Pseudoneoponera verecundae	Pseudoneoponera verecundae	
Pseudoponera	Emery	1900	6	Pseudoponera stigma	Pseudoponera stigma	
Rasopone	Schmidt & Shattuck	2014	11	Rasopone ferruginea	Rasopone ferruginea	
Simopelta	Mann	1922	22	Simopelta jeckylli	Simopelta jeckylli	
Streblognathus	Mayr	1862	2	Streblognathus aethiopicus	Streblognathus aethiopicus	
†Taphopone	Dlussky & Perfilieva	2014	6	†Taphopone karaganensis	†Taphopone macroptera	
Thaumatomyrmex	Mayr	1887	12	Thaumatomyrmex mutilatus	Thaumatomyrmex mutilatus	

=== Proceratiinae ===
The subfamily Proceratiinae was established by Italian entomologist Carlo Emery in 1895, which represents three extant genera and one extinct genus. Found worldwide, these ants are mainly encountered in tropical and subtropical areas. Little is known about their biology.

Subfamily Proceratiinae Emery, 1895 – four genera, 155 species
Genus name	Binomial authority	Classified	No. of species	Type species	Example image	Ref(s)
†Bradoponera	Mayr	1868	4	†Bradoponera meieri	†Bradoponera meieri	
Discothyrea	Roger	1863	37	Discothyrea testacea	Discothyrea testacea	
Probolomyrmex	Mayr	1901	26	Probolomyrmex filiformis	Probolomyrmex filiformis	
Proceratium	Roger	1863	88	Proceratium silaceum	Proceratium silaceum	

=== Pseudomyrmecinae ===
The subfamily Pseudomyrmecinae was established by M.R. Smith in 1952, which represents three genera of ants that are primarily arboreal nesting ants in the tropical and subtropical regions. They are found in Africa, Asia, Australia, North America and South America.

Subfamily Pseudomyrmecinae Smith, 1952 – three genera, 251 species
Genus name	Binomial authority	Classified	No. of species	Type species	Example image	Ref(s)
Myrcidris	Ward	1990	1	Myrcidris epicharis	Myrcidris epicharis	
Pseudomyrmex	Lund	1831	147	Pseudomyrmex gracilis	Pseudomyrmex gracilis	
Tetraponera	Smith	1852	103	Tetraponera nigra	Tetraponera nigra	

=== Sphecomyrminae ===
The subfamily Sphecomyrminae contains 9 fossil genera of stem ants. Most fossilized ants from Cretaceous amber were placed in this subfamily, however revisions in 2017 and 2020 removed several genera and added former members of the subfamily Armaniinae.

Subfamily Sphecomyrminae Wilson & Brown, 1967
Genus name	Binomial authority	Classified	No. of species	Type species	Example image	Ref(s)
†Armania	Dlussky	1983	4	†Armania robusta	N/A	
†Boltonimecia	Borysenko	2017	1	†Boltonimecia canadensis	†Boltonimecia canadensis	
†Cretomyrma	Dlussky	1975	2	†Cretomyrma arnoldii	N/A	
†Gerontoformica	Nel & Perrault	2004	13	†Gerontoformica cretacica	†Gerontoformica cretacica	
†Orapia	Dlussky, Brothers & Rasnitsyn	2004	2	†Orapia rayneri	†Orapia rayneri	
†Pseudarmania	Dlussky	1983	2	†Pseudarmania rasnitsyni	N/A	
†Sphecomyrma	Wilson & Brown	1967	2	†Sphecomyrma freyi	†Sphecomyrma freyi	
†Zigrasimecia	Barden & Grimaldi	2013	2	†Zigrasimecia tonsora	†Zigrasimecia tonsora	

== Incertae sedis ==
There are several ant genera where their taxonomic placement is uncertain (incertae sedis). These genera have not yet been assigned to any subfamily within Formicidae; 16 genera are currently listed as incertae sedis.

Incertae sedis genera
Genus name	Genus authority	Described	No. of species	Type species	Image	Ref(s)
†Archaeopone	Dlussky	1975	2	†Archaeopone kzylzharica	N/A	
†Baikuris	Dlussky	1987	4	†Baikuris mandibularis	†Baikuris mandibularis	
†Calyptites	Scudder	1877	1	†Calyptites antediluvianum	N/A	
†Camelomecia	Barden & Grimaldi	2016	1	†Camelomecia janovitzi	†Camelomecia janovitzi	
†Cretopone	Dlussky	1975	1	†Cretopone magna	†Cretopone magna	
†Curticorna (Note: †Curticorna was placed in Dorylinae by Hong (2002), but this genus is "definitely not Dorylinae" according to Barry Bolton. Dlussky & Wedmann (2012) suggest that Curticorna may belong to Ectatomminae.)	Hong	2002	1	†Curticorna leptogastrosa	N/A	
†Dlusskyidris	Bolton	1994	1	†Dlusskyidris zherichini	†Dlusskyidris zherichini	
†Eoaenictites (Note: †Eoaenictites was placed in Aenictinae (now Dorylinae) by Hong (2002), but this genus is "definitely not Aenictinae" according to Barry Bolton.)	Hong	2002	1	†Eoaenictites castanifurvus	N/A	
†Eoformica	Cockerell	1921	6	†Eoformica eocenica	†Eoformica pinguis	
†Fonsecahymen	Martins-Neto & Mendes	2002	1	†Fonsecahymen stigmata	N/A	
†Klondikia	Dlussky & Rasnitsyn	2003	1	†Klondikia whiteae	N/A	
†Kohlsimyrma	Dlussky & Rasnitsyn	2003	3	†Kohlsimyrma laticeps	N/A	
†Myanmyrma	Engel & Grimaldi	2005	1	†Myanmyrma gracilis	†Myanmyrma gracilis	
†Petropone	Dlussky	1975	1	†Petropone petiolata	†Petropone petiolata	
†Poneropterus	Dlussky	1983	1	†Poneropterus sphecoides	N/A	

== Formerly included in Formicidae ==
There are several genera which were formerly placed in Formicidae, but have subsequently been removed. These genera are now placed in other families, are considered incertae sedis within Hymenoptera taxonomy, or are considered invalid.

Excluded genera
Genus name	Genus authority	Described	No. of species	Type species	Current placement	Image	Ref(s)
Condylodon	Lund	1831	1	Condylodon audouini	Unidentifiable, considered invalid by Bolton, 2020	N/A	
†Dolichomyrma	Dlussky	1975	2	†Dolichomyrma longiceps	Incertae sedis in Aculeata	N/A	
Hypochira	Buckley	1866	1	Formica subspinosa	Unidentifiable, considered invalid by Bolton, 2020	N/A	
†Khetania	Dlussky	1999	1	†Khetania mandibulata	Incertae sedis in Aculeata	N/A	

== See also ==
- List of ant subfamilies
