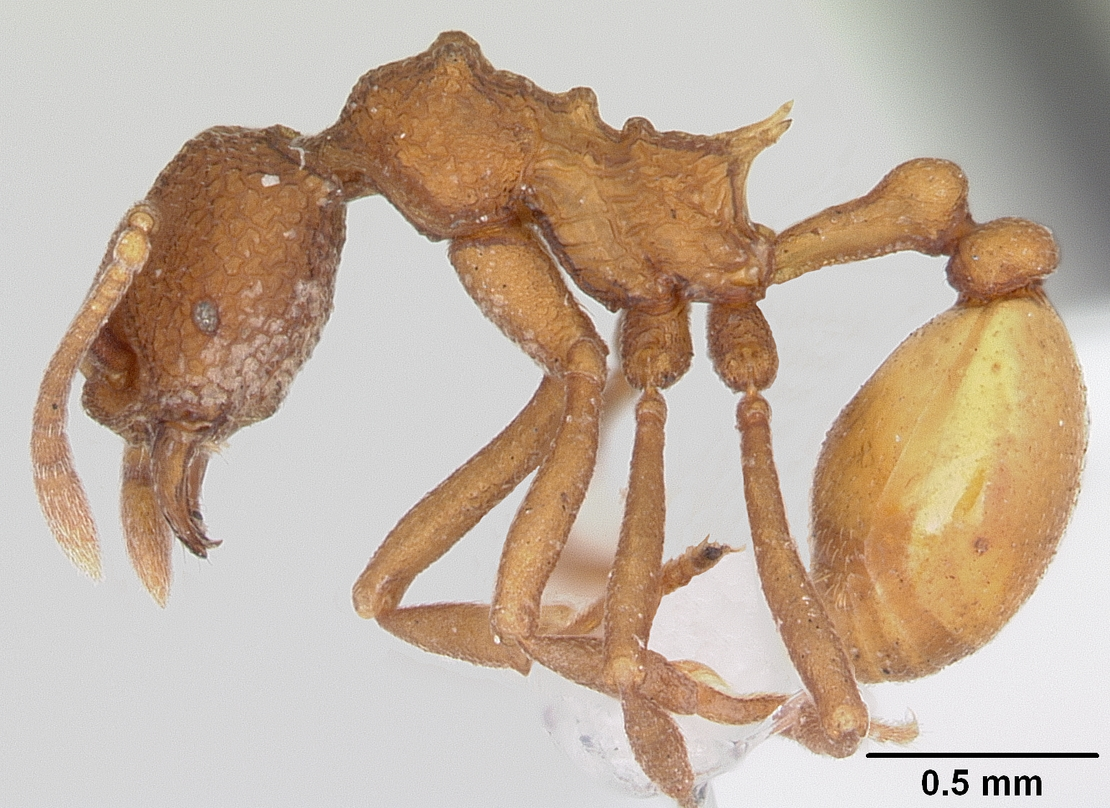
- Dacatria templaris worker

Scientific classification
- Kingdom: Animalia
- Phylum: Arthropoda
- Class: Insecta
- Order: Hymenoptera
- Family: Formicidae
- Subfamily: Myrmicinae
- Tribe: Crematogastrini
- Genus: Dacatria; Rigato, 1994
- Species: D. templaris

Binomial name
- Dacatria templaris Rigato, 1994

= Dacatria =

Genus of ants

Dacatria is a genus of ants in the subfamily Myrmicinae. It contains the single species Dacatria templaris, first described from South Korea. The genus is known only from South Korea, Vietnam and China.
