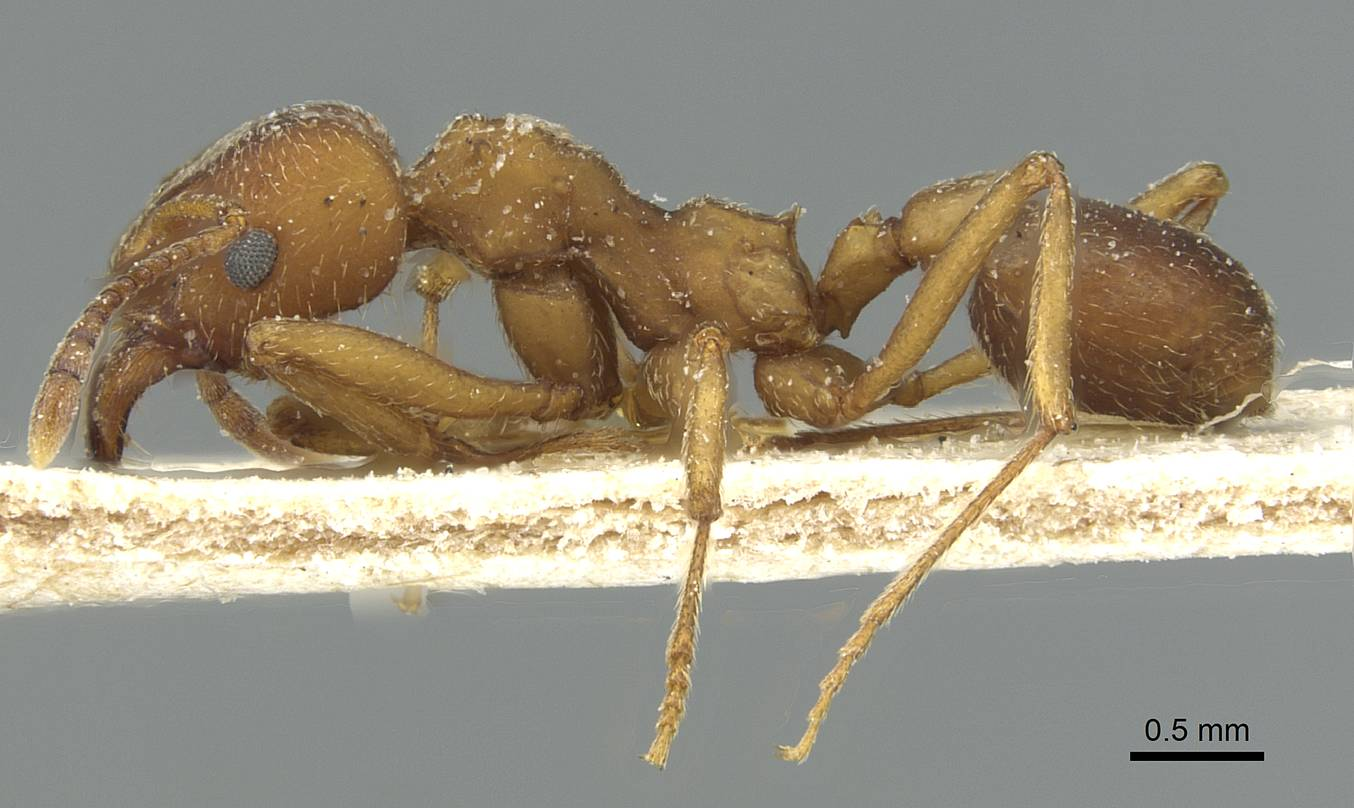
- Paramycetophylax bruchi worker

Scientific classification
- Domain: Eukaryota
- Kingdom: Animalia
- Phylum: Arthropoda
- Class: Insecta
- Order: Hymenoptera
- Family: Formicidae
- Subfamily: Myrmicinae
- Tribe: Attini
- Genus: Paramycetophylax; Kusnezov, 1956
- Species: P. bruchi

Binomial name
- Paramycetophylax bruchi Kusnezov, 1956

= Paramycetophylax =

Genus of ants

Paramycetophylax is a genus of fungus-growing ants in the subfamily Myrmicinae. It contains the single species Paramycetophylax bruchi, known only from Argentina. Workers collect leaflets from Prosopis flexuosa that they bring back to the nest to act as substrate for the fungus.
