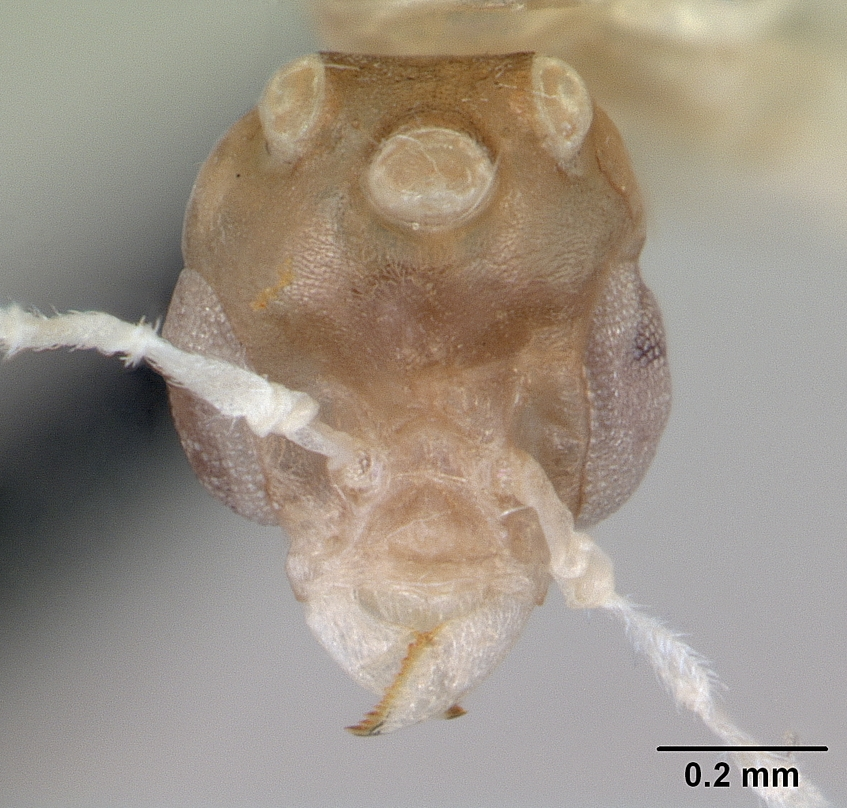
- Head of an A. bruchi male

Scientific classification
- Domain: Eukaryota
- Kingdom: Animalia
- Phylum: Arthropoda
- Class: Insecta
- Order: Hymenoptera
- Family: Formicidae
- Subfamily: Dolichoderinae
- Tribe: Leptomyrmecini
- Genus: Anillidris; Santschi, 1936
- Species: A. bruchi

Binomial name
- Anillidris bruchi Santschi, 1936

= Anillidris =

Genus of ants

Anillidris is a genus of ants which only contains the species Anillidris bruchi. The genus is known only from a few collections in Brazil and Argentina. For a time Anillidris was synonymous with genus Linepithema, but was revived from synonymy by Shattuck (1992).

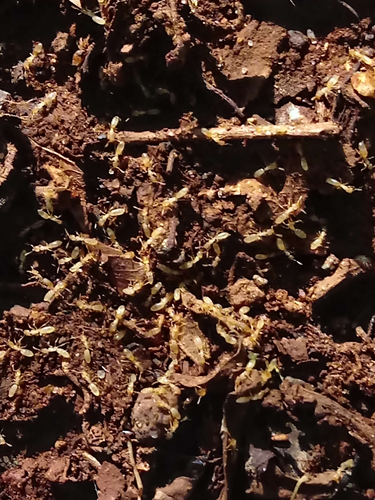
