= Condylodon =

Scientific classification
- Domain: Eukaryota
- Kingdom: Animalia
- Phylum: Arthropoda
- Class: Insecta
- Order: Hymenoptera
- Family: Formicidae
- Subfamily: incertae sedis
- Genus: Condylodon; Lund, 1831
- Species: C. audouini

Binomial name
- Condylodon audouini Lund, 1831

Genus of ants

Condylodon is a genus of ant with an uncertain placement (incertae sedis) in the family Formicidae. It contains the single species Condylodon audouini, first described from a single specimen by Lund (1831) in a paper on Brazilian ants.

== Taxonomy ==
The type material is presumed to be lost and the taxonomy of species remains uncertain. It has variously been speculated to belong to different families and subfamilies, including Mutillidae, a family of wasps with females resembling large ants, by Swainson & Shuckard (1840). Dalla Torre (1893) relegated the genus to a junior synonym of Pseudomyrma (now Pseudomyrmex, subfamily Pseudomyrmecinae). Emery (1921) dubiously placed it in Ponerinae. Ward (1990) excluded the taxon from Pseudomyrmecinae, and agreed with Emery's placement in Ponerinae as the most likely candidate, and listed Ectatomma as a possible identity of the genus. Bolton (1994) placed it as incertae sedis in Ponerinae, and most recently, as incertae sedis in Formicidae (Bolton, 2003).
