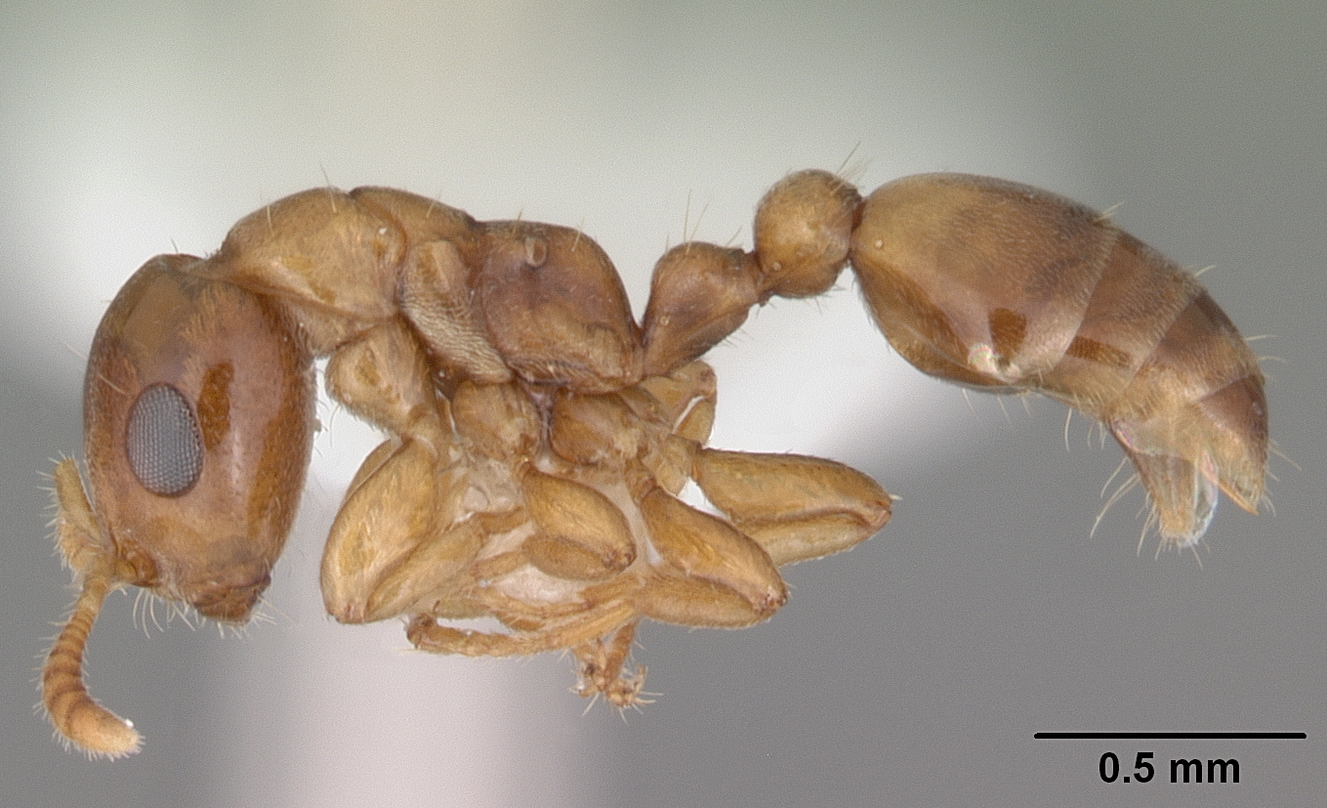
- M. epicharis worker

Scientific classification
- Domain: Eukaryota
- Kingdom: Animalia
- Phylum: Arthropoda
- Class: Insecta
- Order: Hymenoptera
- Family: Formicidae
- Subfamily: Pseudomyrmecinae
- Tribe: Pseudomyrmecini
- Genus: Myrcidris; Ward, 1990
- Species: M. epicharis

Binomial name
- Myrcidris epicharis Ward, 1990

= Myrcidris =

Genus of ants

Myrcidris is a genus of ants in the subfamily Pseudomyrmecinae containing a single species, Myrcidris epicharis. The genus is known only from a few localities north of Manaus, Brazil.
