= Afromyrma =

Afromyrma Temporal range: Turonian

Scientific classification
- Domain: Eukaryota
- Kingdom: Animalia
- Phylum: Arthropoda
- Class: Insecta
- Order: Hymenoptera
- Family: Formicidae
- Subfamily: Myrmicinae
- Tribe: incertae sedis
- Genus: †Afromyrma; Dlussky, Brothers & Rasnitsyn, 2004
- Species: †A. petrosa

Binomial name
- †Afromyrma petrosa Dlussky, Brothers & Rasnitsyn, 2004

Genus of ants

Afromyrma is an extinct genus of ant in the formicid subfamily Myrmicinae, and is currently unplaced in any of the tribes of that subfamily. The genus contains a single described species, Afromyrma petrosa. Afromyrma is known from a single Upper Cretaceous fossil, which was found in Orapa in the Central District of Botswana.

== History and classification ==
Afromyrma is known from a solitary fossil from Orapa, the holotype, specimen number BP/2/26501 tentatively identified as a female, though there is a possibility this is incorrect. The holotype specimen is mostly complete but is rather poor in details, and is preserved as a compression fossil in shale. The shales and mudstones of the Orapa site were rapidly deposited in a crater lake formed as the result of a large volcanic eruption in the Cretaceous. The sediment originated as an epiclastic kimberlite and derives from rapid weathering and decomposition of the sides of the kimberlite crater. Of the four major sedimentation types that have been observe at Orapa, fossils are found in only two, the granular mass flows and the fine-grained sediments: woody debris fossils are found in the granular mass flows, but well-preserved fossils are only recovered in the fine-grained sediments. The fossil-bearing stratum was uncovered during mining of the underlying diamond-bearing rocks at the site. Radiometric dating of the kimberlite pipe reported on in 1977 gave a general age of approximately 84 to 92 million years ago. Further dating utilizing zircon crystals reported on in 2004 gave more defined age of approximately 91 million years ago placing the date in the Turonian age of the late Cretaceous.

The fossil was first studied by Russian paleontologists Gennady M. Dlussky and Alexandr Rasnitsyn with South African paleontologist Denis Brothers. Their 2004 type description of the new genus and species was published in the journal Insect Systematics and Evolution. The genus name Afromyrma is a combination of Africa, where the fossil was found, and the Greek myrmex which means "ant". The specific epithet petrosa, a derivation of the Latin word petra meaning rock is a reference to the fossil status of the species.

== Description ==
The solitary Afromyrma specimen is incomplete and shows poor preservation in general with portions of the legs and antennae missing or very indistinct. Overall it is estimated the full body would have been around 10.3 millimetres (0.41 in) long. Overall the shape of the head capsule is shorter than it is wide, with eyes located slightly to the rear of the heads midpoint and having an oval shape. The mandibles are triangular in outline with distinct teeth on the chewing margin. The specimen has a waist divided into two segments and the petiole shows a weakly developed node. The abdomen segmentation and general form of the abdominal apex are suggestive of a male ant, but the soft nature of the abdominal tissue makes this interpretation problematic, in contrast the harder head capsule is more reminiscent of a female and thus the fossil is interpreted as such.
