= Elaphrodites =

Scientific classification
- Domain: Eukaryota
- Kingdom: Animalia
- Phylum: Arthropoda
- Class: Insecta
- Order: Hymenoptera
- Family: Formicidae
- Subfamily: Dolichoderinae
- Tribe: incertae sedis
- Genus: †Elaphrodites; Zhang, J., 1989

Type species
- Elaphrodites scutulatus

Diversity
- 2 fossil species

Genus of ants

Elaphrodites is an extinct genus of ants of the subfamily Dolichoderinae. Two fossils were discovered and described by Zhang in 1989.

== Species ==
- Elaphrodites mutatus Zhang, 1989
- Elaphrodites scutulatus Zhang, 1989
