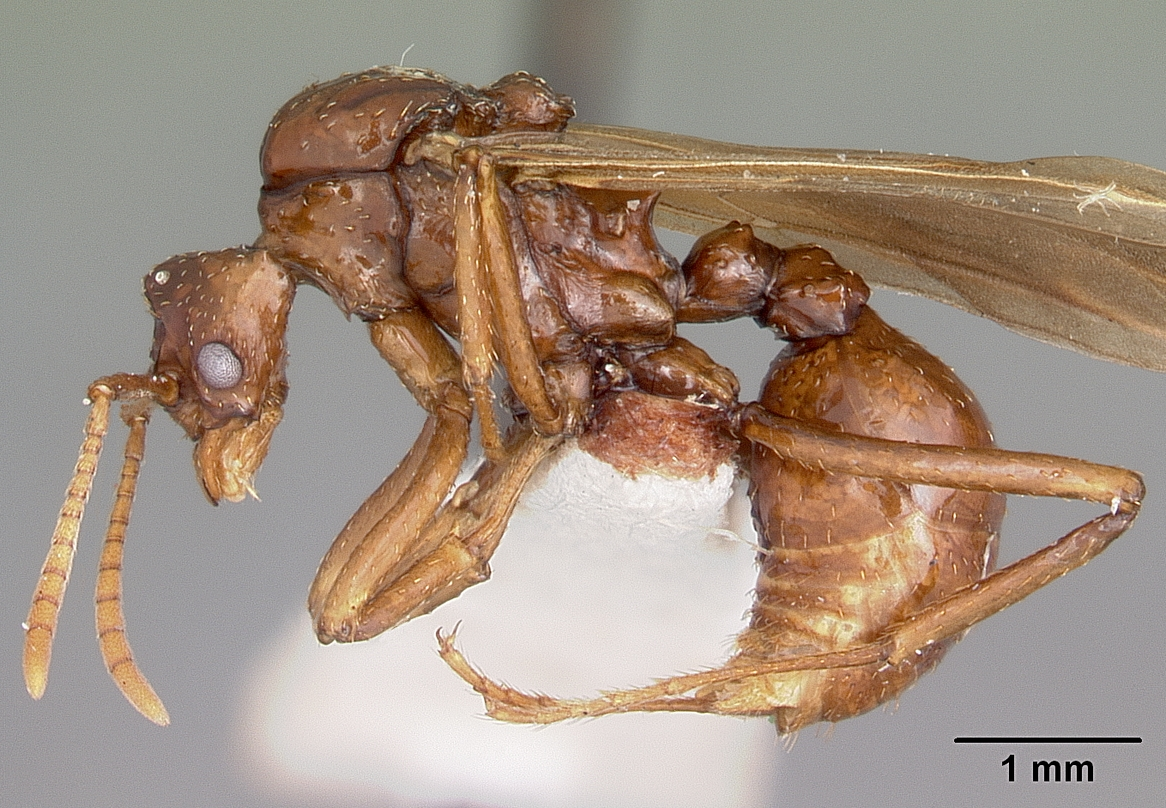
- Pseudoatta argentina male from Argentina

Conservation status
- Vulnerable (IUCN 2.3)

Scientific classification
- Kingdom: Animalia
- Phylum: Arthropoda
- Class: Insecta
- Order: Hymenoptera
- Family: Formicidae
- Subfamily: Myrmicinae
- Tribe: Attini
- Genus: Pseudoatta; Gallardo, 1916
- Species: P. argentina

Binomial name
- Pseudoatta argentina Gallardo, 1916

= Pseudoatta =

Genus of ants

Pseudoatta is a genus of ant in the subfamily Myrmicinae. It contains the single species Pseudoatta argentina, native to Argentina.
