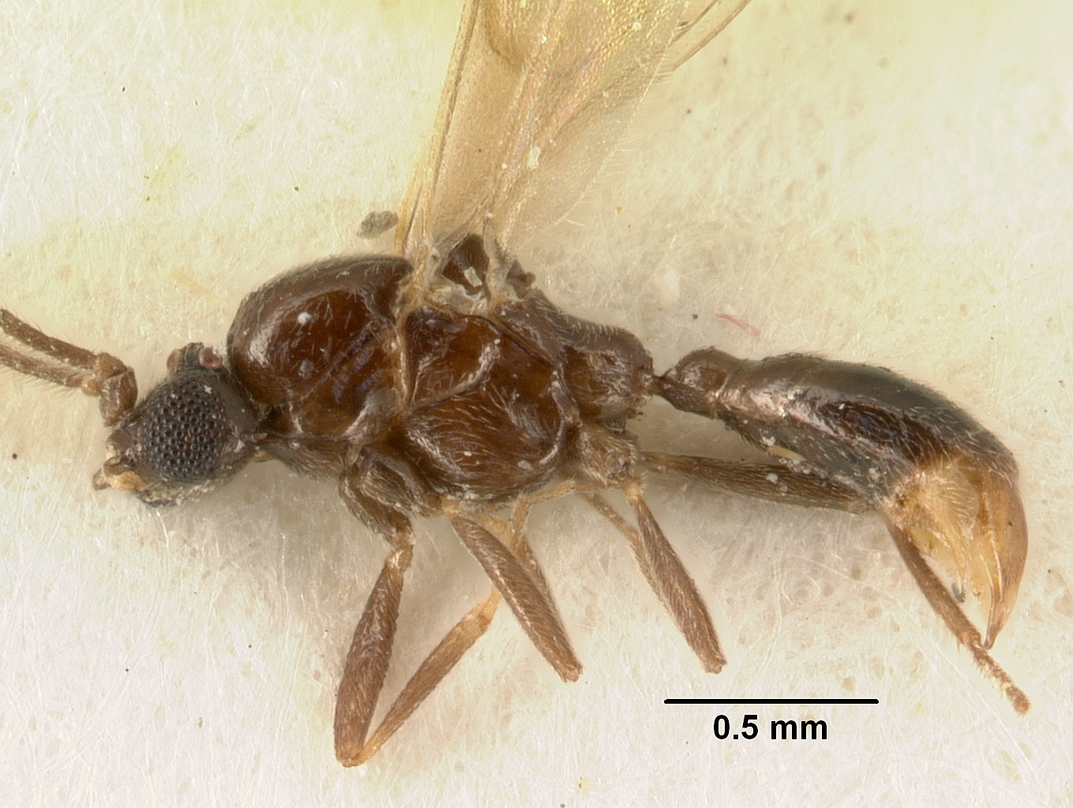
- Yavnella argamani male

Scientific classification
- Domain: Eukaryota
- Kingdom: Animalia
- Phylum: Arthropoda
- Class: Insecta
- Order: Hymenoptera
- Family: Formicidae
- Genus: Yavnella
- Species: Y. argamani

Binomial name
- Yavnella argamani Kugler, J., 1987

= Yavnella argamani =

Species of ant

Yavnella argamani is a species of ant belonging to the Yavnella ant genus. Described by Kugler in 1987, it is one of the two species in its genus. It is native to Israel.
