= Eurymyrmex =

Scientific classification
- Kingdom: Animalia
- Phylum: Arthropoda
- Class: Insecta
- Order: Hymenoptera
- Family: Formicidae
- Subfamily: Dolichoderinae
- Tribe: incertae sedis
- Genus: †Eurymyrmex; Zhang, Sun & Zhang, 1994
- Species: †E. geologicus

Binomial name
- †Eurymyrmex geologicus Zhang, Sun & Zhang, 1994

Genus of ants

Eurymyrmex is an extinct genus of ant in the Formicidae subfamily Dolichoderinae. The genus contains a single described species Eurymyrmex geologicus. It was described in 1994, where the first fossils of the ant were found in China.
