= Kotshkorkia =

Scientific classification
- Domain: Eukaryota
- Kingdom: Animalia
- Phylum: Arthropoda
- Class: Insecta
- Order: Hymenoptera
- Family: Formicidae
- Subfamily: Dolichoderinae
- Tribe: incertae sedis
- Genus: †Kotshkorkia; Dlussky, 1981
- Species: †K. laticeps

Binomial name
- †Kotshkorkia laticeps Dlussky, 1981

Genus of ants

Kotshkorkia is an extinct genus of ants of the subfamily Dolichoderinae. The genus contains a single described species Kotshkorkia laticeps. It was described by Dlussky in 1981, where the first fossils of the ant were found in Russia.
