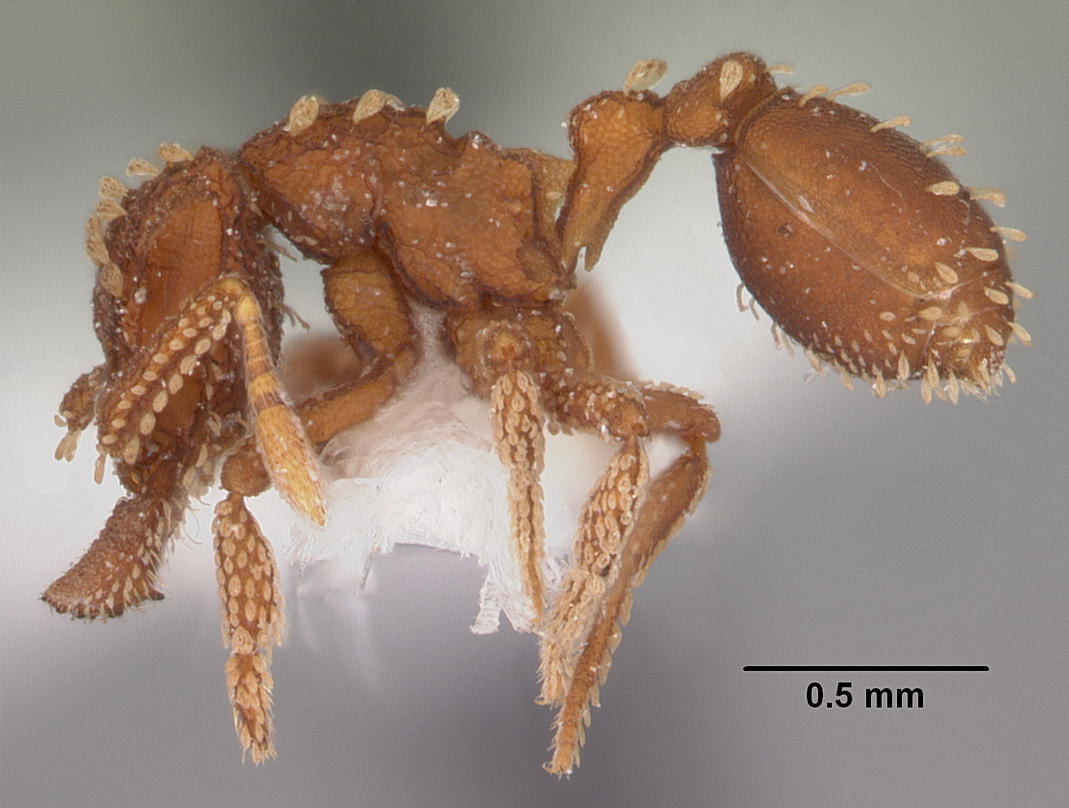
- Talaridris mandibularis worker

Scientific classification
- Domain: Eukaryota
- Kingdom: Animalia
- Phylum: Arthropoda
- Class: Insecta
- Order: Hymenoptera
- Family: Formicidae
- Subfamily: Myrmicinae
- Tribe: Attini
- Genus: Talaridris; Weber, 1941
- Species: T. mandibularis

Binomial name
- Talaridris mandibularis Weber, 1941

= Talaridris =

Genus of ants

Talaridris is a genus of ant in the subfamily Myrmicinae containing the single species Talaridris mandibularis.
