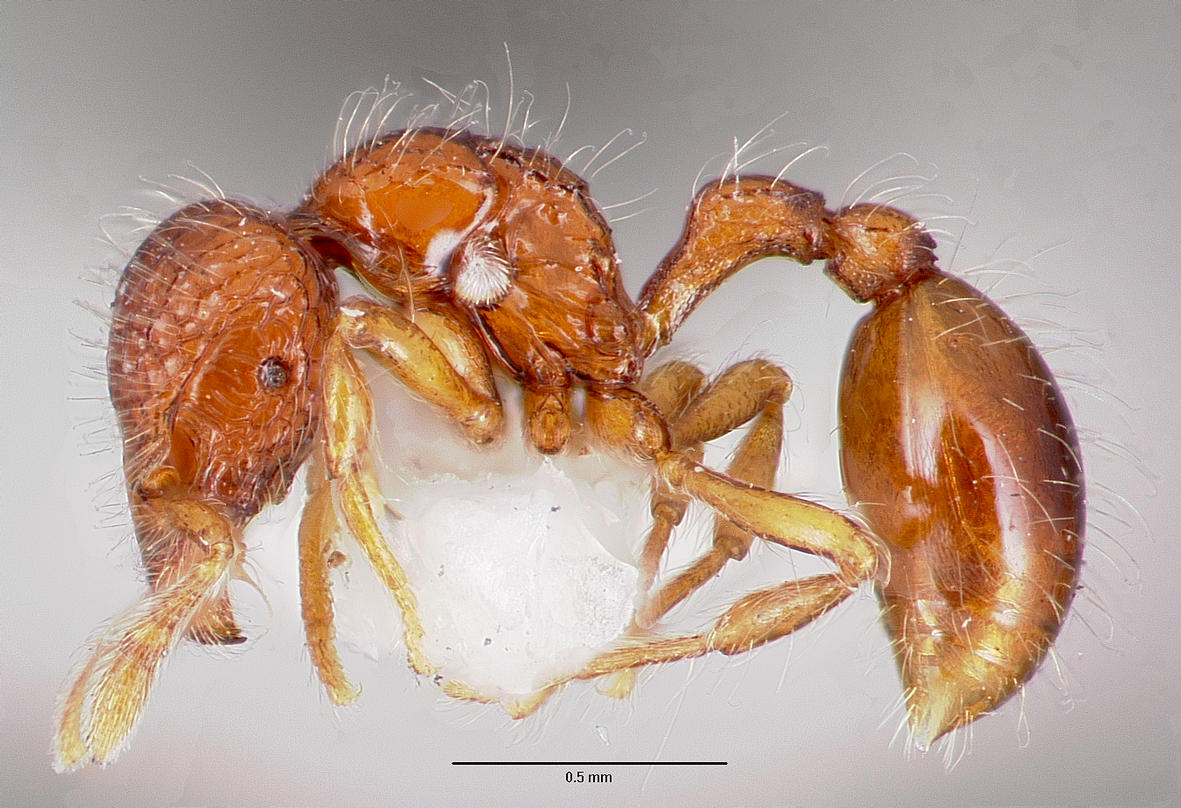
- Pilotrochus besmerus worker from Madagascar

Scientific classification
- Domain: Eukaryota
- Kingdom: Animalia
- Phylum: Arthropoda
- Class: Insecta
- Order: Hymenoptera
- Family: Formicidae
- Subfamily: Myrmicinae
- Tribe: Attini
- Genus: Pilotrochus; Brown, 1978
- Species: P. besmerus

Binomial name
- Pilotrochus besmerus Brown, 1978

= Pilotrochus =

Genus of ants

Pilotrochus is a genus of ants in the subfamily Myrmicinae containing the single species Pilotrochus besmerus. It is known from Madagascar.

The name of the genus is derived from Greek plios, "hair" + trochos, "wheel"; the specific name is from Latin bes, "eight of twelve" + Greek meros, "part", referencing the eight-segmented antennae.
