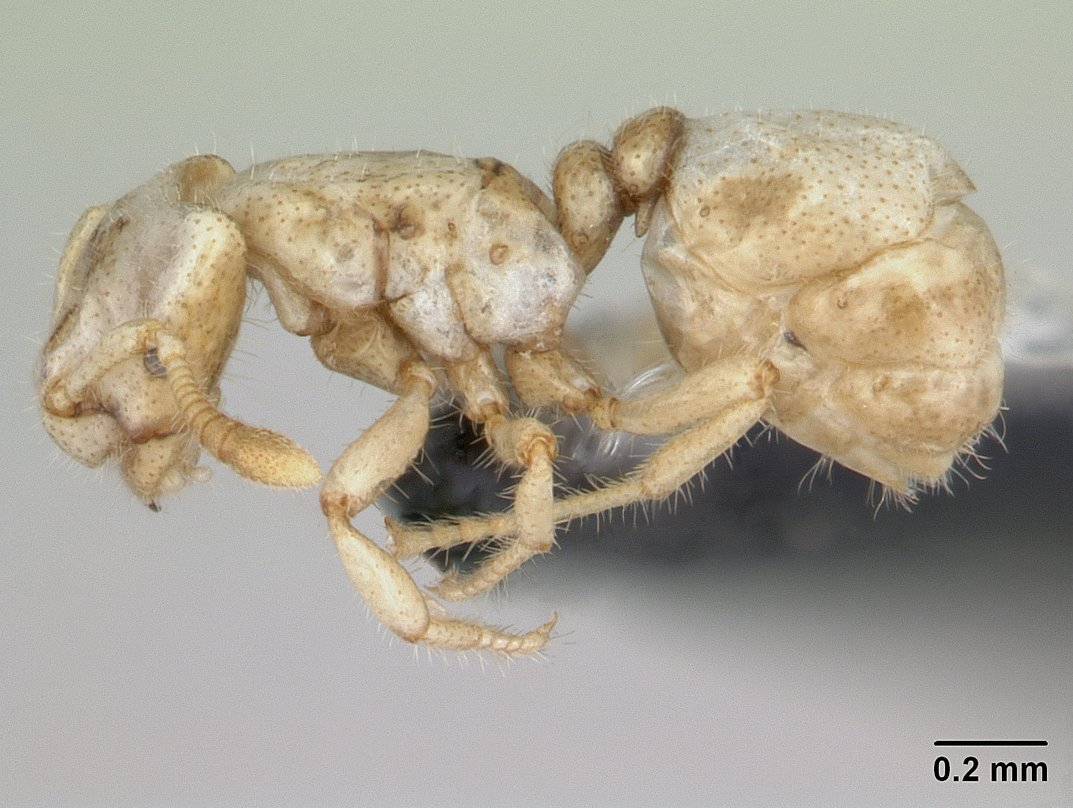
- Tropidomyrmex elianae profile view

Scientific classification
- Domain: Eukaryota
- Kingdom: Animalia
- Phylum: Arthropoda
- Class: Insecta
- Order: Hymenoptera
- Family: Formicidae
- Subfamily: Myrmicinae
- Tribe: Solenopsidini
- Genus: Tropidomyrmex; Silva, Feitosa, Brandão & Diniz, 2009
- Species: T. elianae

Binomial name
- Tropidomyrmex elianae Silva, Feitosa, Brandão & Diniz, 2009

= Tropidomyrmex =

Genus of ants

Tropidomyrmex is a Neotropical genus of ants in the subfamily Myrmicinae. The genus contains the single species Tropidomyrmex elianae, known from Brazil.
