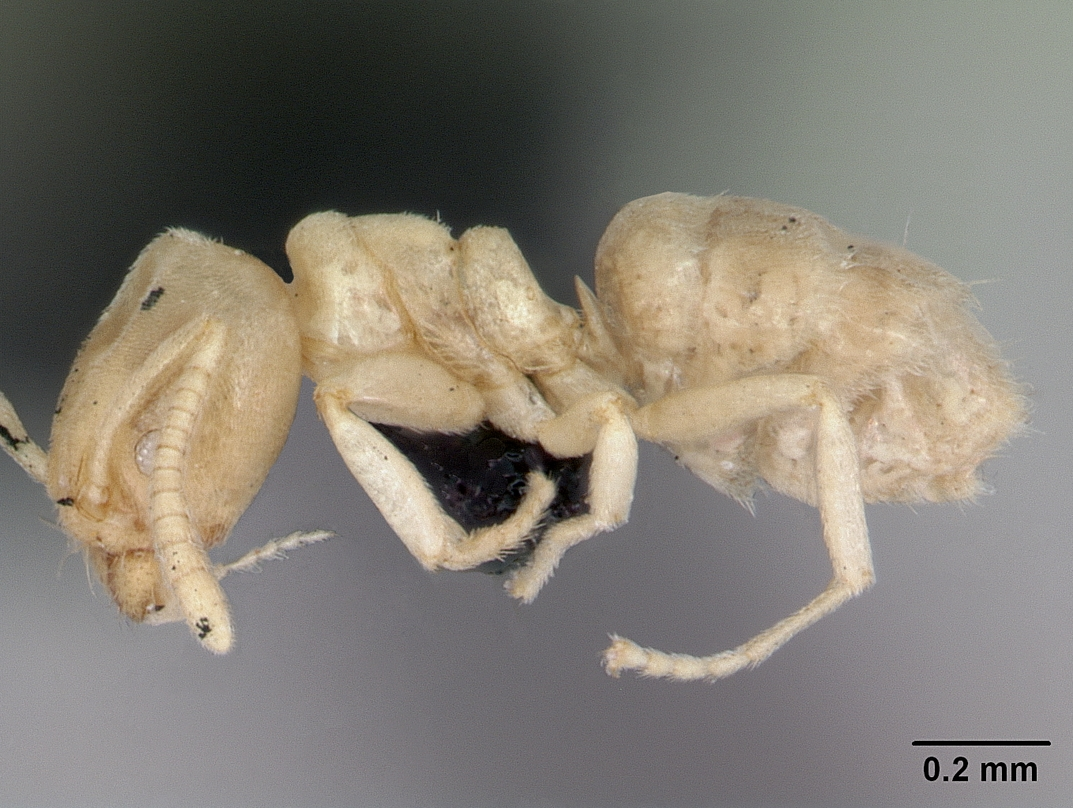
- N. majeri worker from Australia

Scientific classification
- Kingdom: Animalia
- Phylum: Arthropoda
- Class: Insecta
- Order: Hymenoptera
- Family: Formicidae
- Subfamily: Dolichoderinae
- Tribe: Leptomyrmecini
- Genus: Nebothriomyrmex; Dubovikov, 2004
- Species: N. majeri

Binomial name
- Nebothriomyrmex majeri Dubovikov, 2004

= Nebothriomyrmex =

Genus of ants

Nebothriomyrmex is a genus of ants in the subfamily Dolichoderinae containing the single species Nebothriomyrmex majeri. The genus is known from Western Australia.
