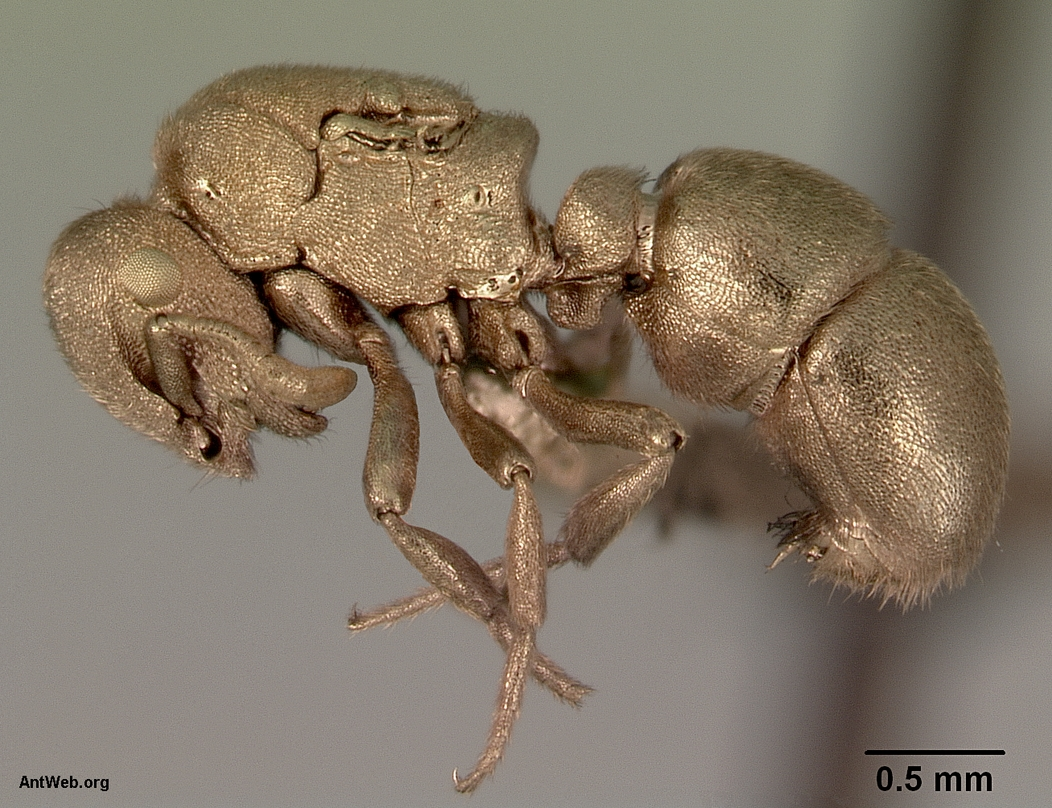
- Sputter-coated (i.e. the golden color is not natural) A. relicta queen to be used in scanning electron microscopy (SEM)

Scientific classification
- Kingdom: Animalia
- Phylum: Arthropoda
- Class: Insecta
- Order: Hymenoptera
- Family: Formicidae
- Subfamily: Ectatomminae
- Tribe: Heteroponerini
- Genus: Aulacopone; Arnol'di, 1930
- Species: A. relicta

Binomial name
- Aulacopone relicta Arnol'di, 1930

= Aulacopone =

Genus of ants

Aulacopone is a monotypic genus of ants in the subfamily Ectatomminae containing the single species Aulacopone relicta. The genus was described by Arnoldi (1930) from a unique dealate female collected at Ələzəpin (Alazapin), near Lankaran, in Azerbaijan S.S.R., Soviet Union (now Azerbaijan), near its border with Iran. The specimen was taken in galleries of the formicine ant Lasius emarginatus, under the bark of an oak stump, in mid-montane forest.
