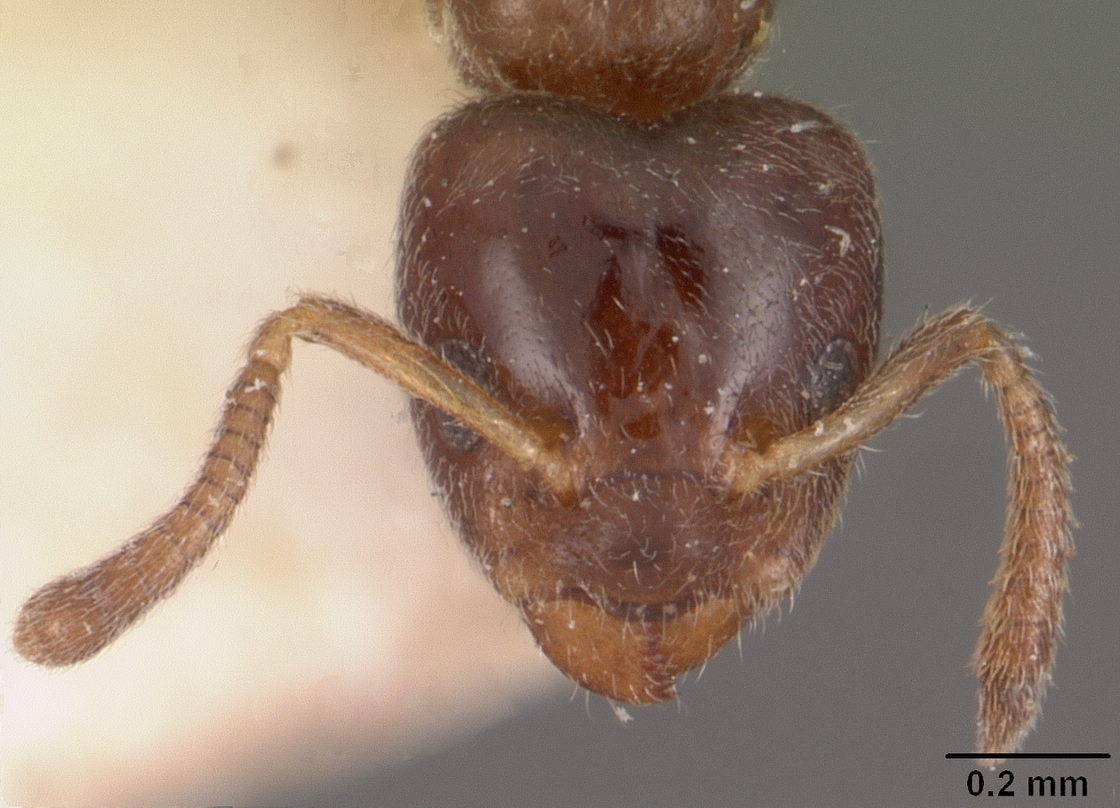
- Head of an E. wellmani worker

Scientific classification
- Kingdom: Animalia
- Phylum: Arthropoda
- Class: Insecta
- Order: Hymenoptera
- Family: Formicidae
- Subfamily: Dolichoderinae
- Tribe: Tapinomini
- Genus: Ecphorella; Forel, 1909
- Species: E. wellmani

Binomial name
- Ecphorella wellmani Forel, 1909

= Ecphorella =

Genus of ants

Ecphorella wellmani is a species of ant and the only known species of genus Ecphorella. The species is only known from workers from the type locality in Benguela, Angola. Nothing is known about their biology.
