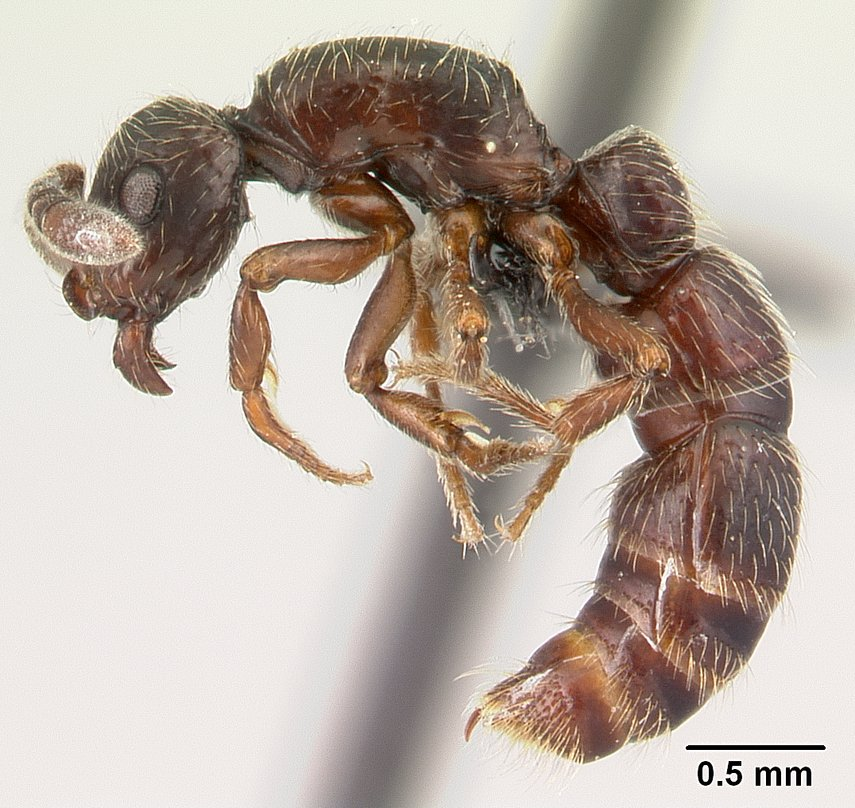

Scientific classification
- Domain: Eukaryota
- Kingdom: Animalia
- Phylum: Arthropoda
- Class: Insecta
- Order: Hymenoptera
- Family: Formicidae
- Subfamily: Dorylinae
- Genus: Lividopone; Fisher & Bolton, 2016
- Species: L. livida

Binomial name
- Lividopone livida (Brown, 1975)

Synonyms
- Cerapachys lividus Brown, 1975

= Lividopone =

Genus of ants

Lividopone is a monotypic genus of ants belonging to the family Formicidae containing the single species Lividopone livida and is endemic to Madagascar.
