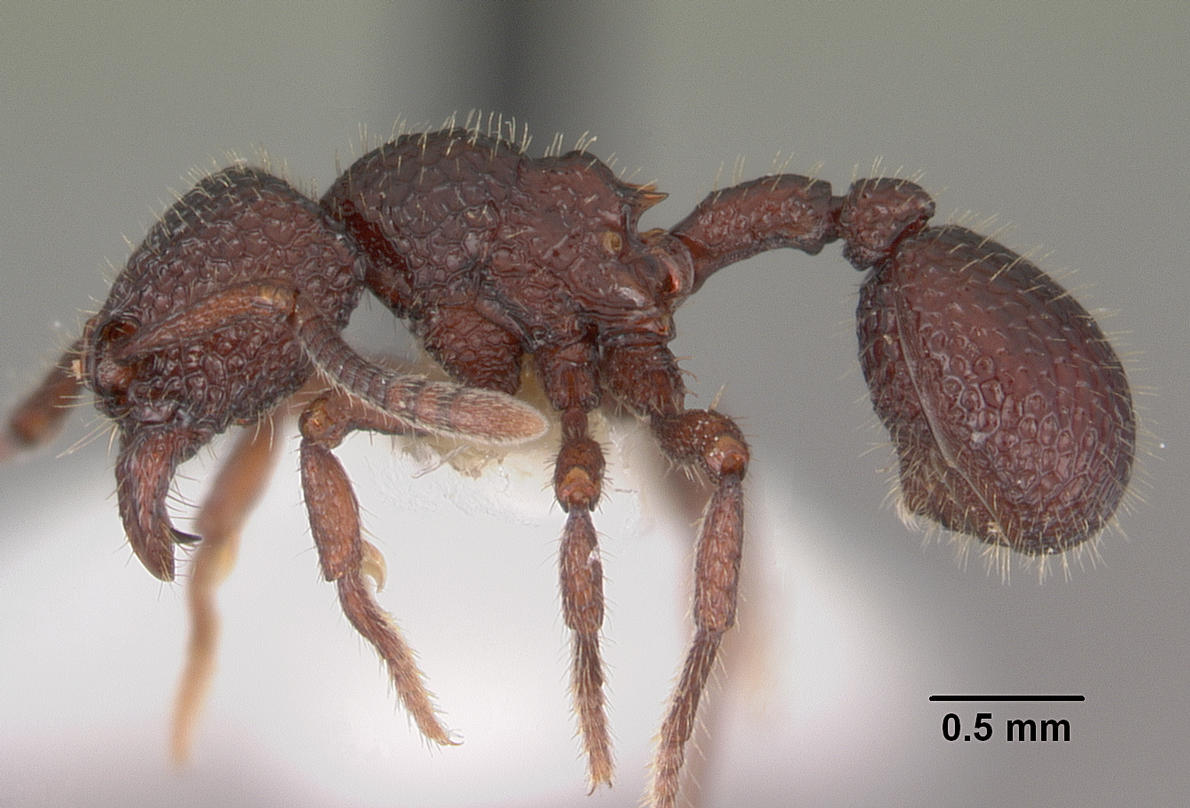

Scientific classification
- Domain: Eukaryota
- Kingdom: Animalia
- Phylum: Arthropoda
- Class: Insecta
- Order: Hymenoptera
- Family: Formicidae
- Subfamily: Myrmicinae
- Tribe: Crematogastrini
- Genus: Secostruma; Bolton, 1988
- Species: S. lethifera

Binomial name
- Secostruma lethifera Bolton, 1988

= Secostruma =

Genus of ants

Secostruma is a genus of subterranean ants in the subfamily Myrmicinae containing the single species Secostruma lethifera. The genus is known from a single worker collected in Gunong Silam, Sabah, Malaysia.
