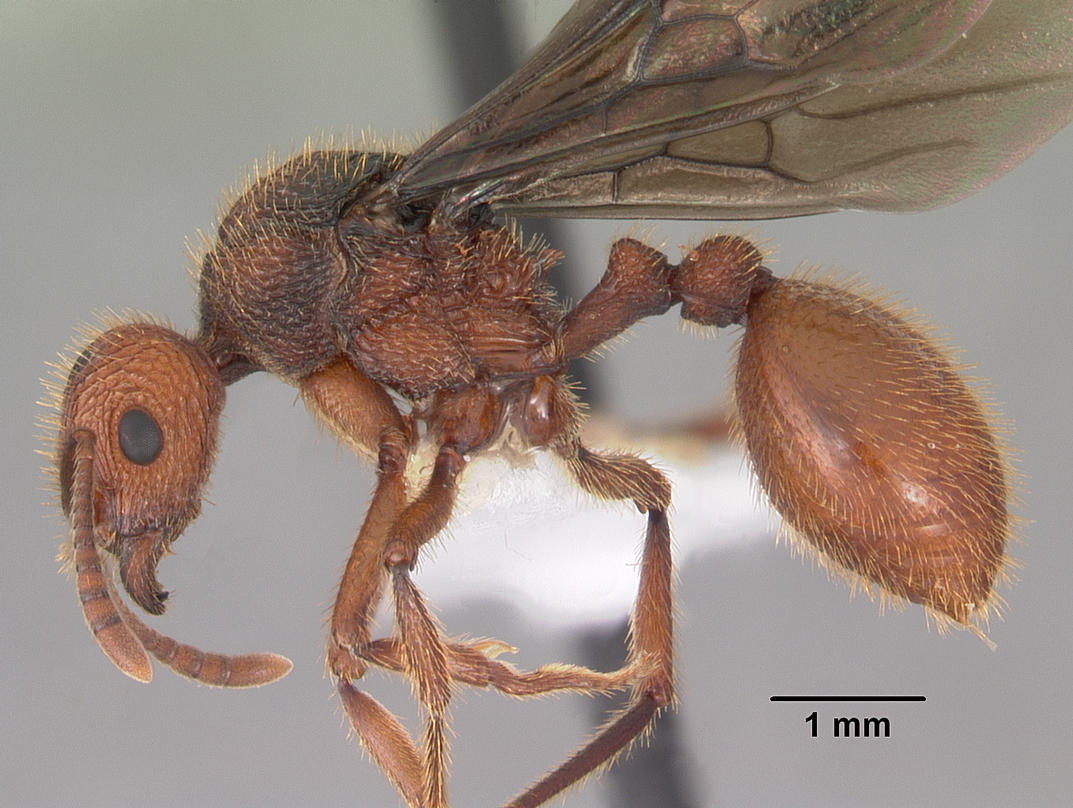
- Bariamyrma hispidula alate queen

Scientific classification
- Domain: Eukaryota
- Kingdom: Animalia
- Phylum: Arthropoda
- Class: Insecta
- Order: Hymenoptera
- Family: Formicidae
- Subfamily: Myrmicinae
- Tribe: Solenopsidini
- Genus: Bariamyrma; Lattke, 1990
- Species: B. hispidula

Binomial name
- Bariamyrma hispidula Lattke, 1990

= Bariamyrma =

Genus of ants

Bariamyrma (from "Baria", name of a river; Latin hispidula, diminutive for "hairy, bristly") is a genus of ants in the subfamily Myrmicinae containing the single species Bariamyrma hispidula. The genus is known only from queens from Venezuela.
