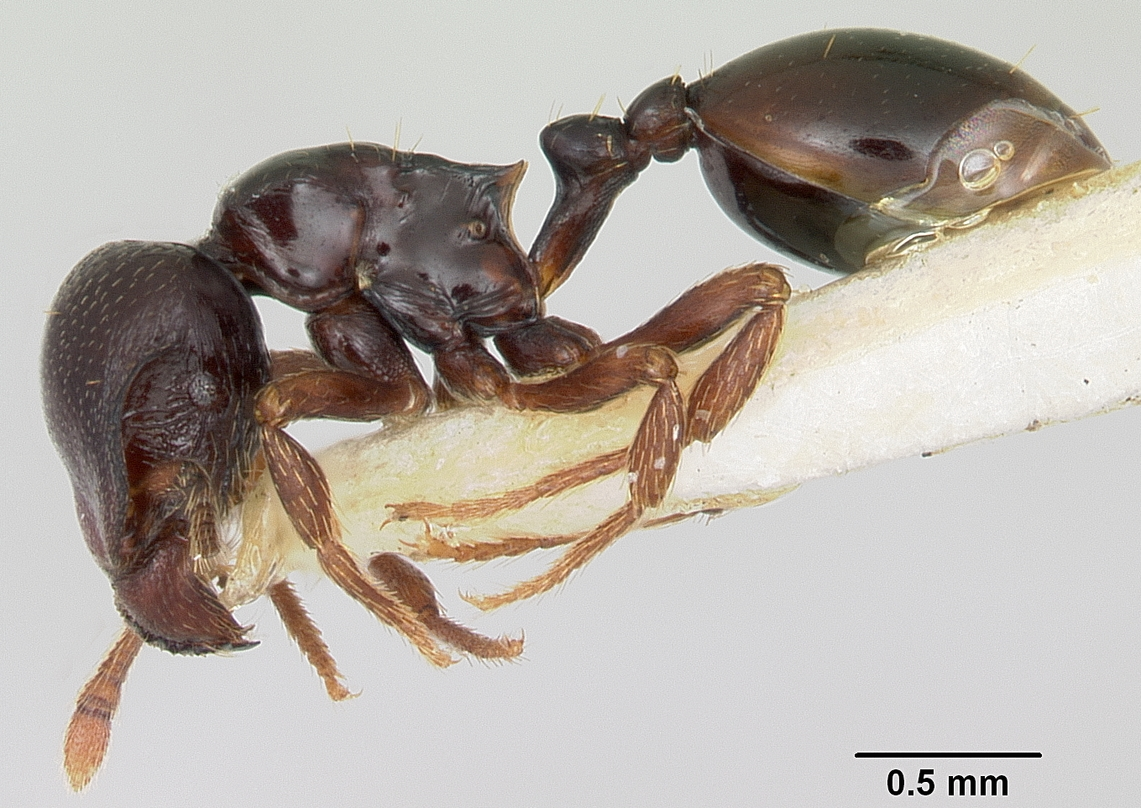
- Phalacromyrmex fugax worker

Scientific classification
- Domain: Eukaryota
- Kingdom: Animalia
- Phylum: Arthropoda
- Class: Insecta
- Order: Hymenoptera
- Family: Formicidae
- Subfamily: Myrmicinae
- Tribe: Attini
- Genus: Phalacromyrmex; Kempf, 1960
- Species: P. fugax

Binomial name
- Phalacromyrmex fugax Kempf, 1960

= Phalacromyrmex =

Genus of ants

Phalacromyrmex is a Neotropical genus of ants in the subfamily Myrmicinae. It contains the single species Phalacromyrmex fugax, first described from three workers collected in Ibicaré, Santa Catarina, Brazil.
