= Alloiomma =

Scientific classification
- Kingdom: Animalia
- Phylum: Arthropoda
- Clade: Pancrustacea
- Class: Insecta
- Order: Hymenoptera
- Family: Formicidae
- Subfamily: Dolichoderinae
- Tribe: incertae sedis
- Genus: †Alloiomma; Zhang, J., 1989

Type species
- Alloiomma changweiensis

Diversity
- 2 fossil species

Genus of ants

Alloiomma is an extinct genus of ants that once belonged to the subfamily Dolichoderinae. A. changweiensis was the first extinct species to be discovered by Zhang in 1989, and another fossil species was discovered in 1994, known as A.differentialis. The ants were endemic to China.

== Species ==
- Alloiomma changweiensis Zhang, 1989
- Alloiomma differentialis Zhang, Sun & Zhang, 1994
