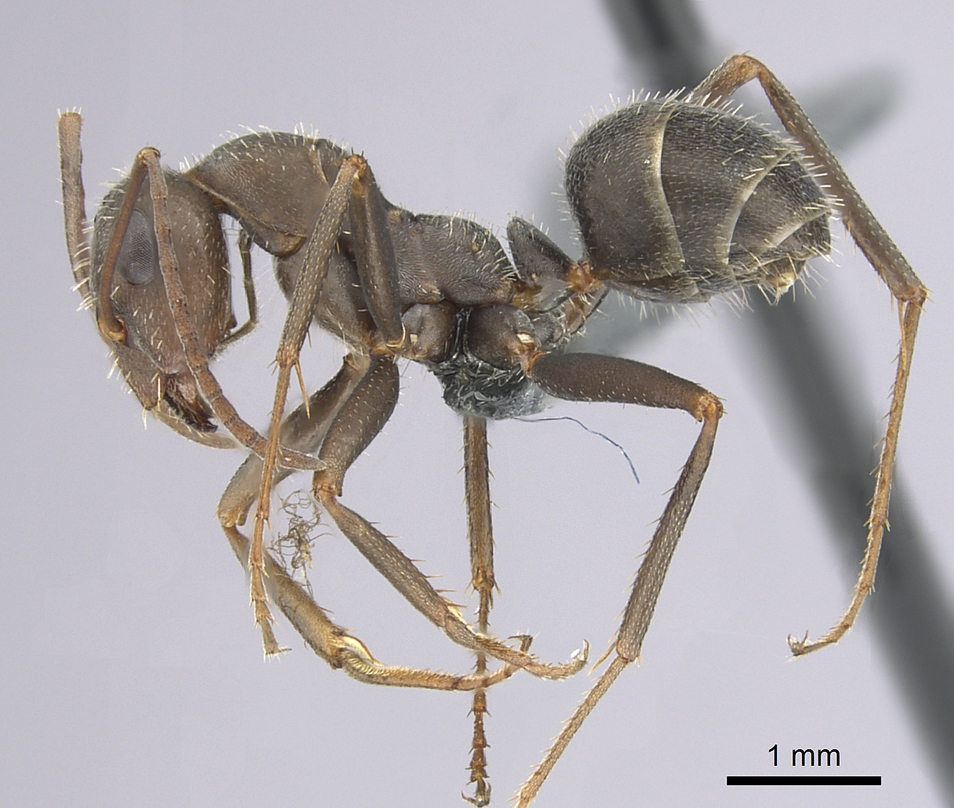
- Iberoformica subrufa

Scientific classification
- Kingdom: Animalia
- Phylum: Arthropoda
- Clade: Pancrustacea
- Class: Insecta
- Order: Hymenoptera
- Family: Formicidae
- Subfamily: Formicinae
- Tribe: Formicini
- Genus: Iberoformica; Tinaut, 1990

Type species
- Iberoformica subrufa Roger, 1859

Diversity
- 1 species

= Iberoformica =

Genus of ants

Iberoformica is a small genus of ants with only one species, Iberoformica subrufa, in the subfamily Formicinae. The genus was first described as a subgenus of Formica by Tinaut (1990), when he reclassified Formica subrufa as Iberoformica subrufa, the type species of the new subgenus. Agosti (1994) synonymized the subgenus with Formica, and the taxon was finally revived and elevated to genus rank by Muñoz-López et al. (2012) based on molecular data.
