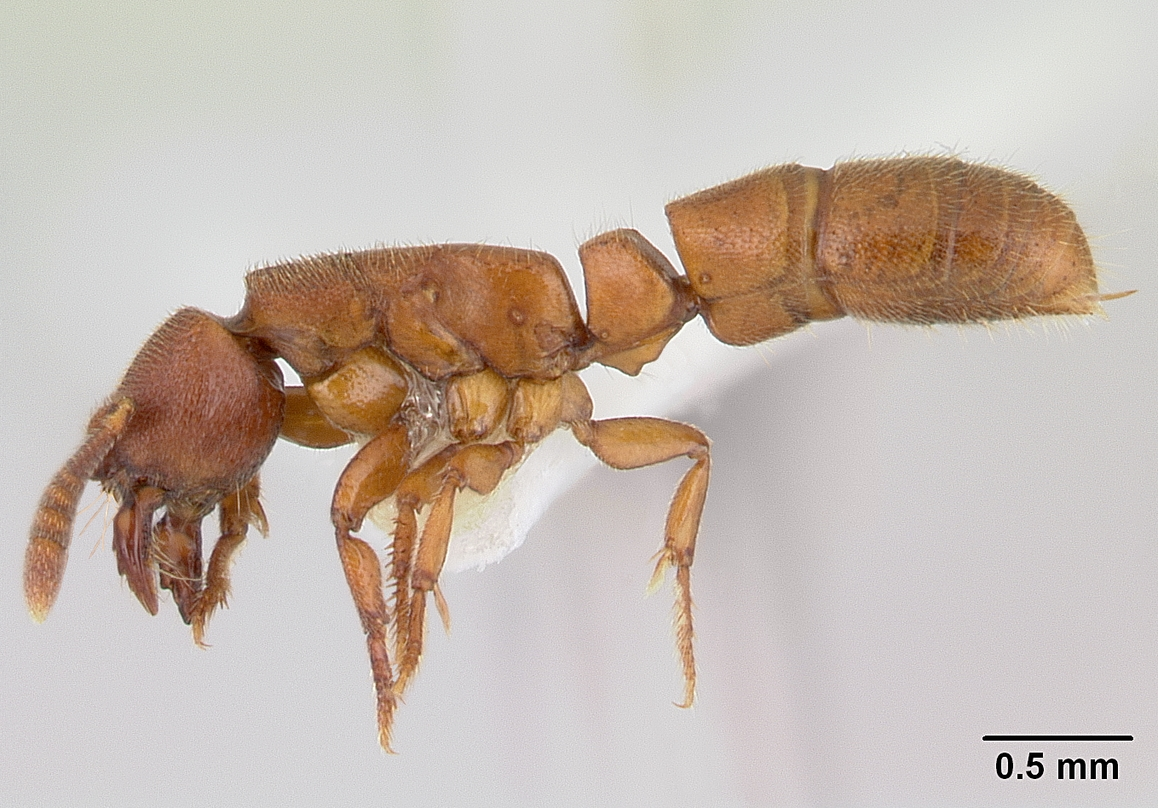
- F. ferox paratype worker

Scientific classification
- Kingdom: Animalia
- Phylum: Arthropoda
- Class: Insecta
- Order: Hymenoptera
- Family: Formicidae
- Subfamily: Ponerinae
- Tribe: Ponerini
- Genus: Feroponera; Bolton & Fisher, 2008
- Species: F. ferox

Binomial name
- Feroponera ferox Bolton & Fisher, 2008

= Feroponera =

Genus of ants

Feroponera is a monotypic Afrotropical genus of ants in the subfamily Ponerinae containing the single species Feroponera ferox. The genus is known only from a few specimens collected from an unoccupied termitary in Cameroon.
