= Ishakidris =

Scientific classification
- Kingdom: Animalia
- Phylum: Arthropoda
- Class: Insecta
- Order: Hymenoptera
- Family: Formicidae
- Clade: Myrmicomorpha
- Subfamily: Myrmicinae
- Tribe: Attini
- Genus: Ishakidris; Bolton, 1984

Type species
- Ishakidris ascitaspis Bolton, 1984

Diversity
- 2 species

Genus of ants

Ishakidris is a genus of myrmicine ants containing two species. The genus was known only from a single worker of I. ascitaspis collected in 1978 from the leaf litter in the Gunung Mulu National Park, Sarawak, Malaysian Borneo, however a second species I. hastifera was described in 2026.

== Species ==
As of 2026, the genus contains two species.

- Ishakidris ascitaspis Bolton, 1984
- Ishakidris hastifera Baptista et al., 2026
