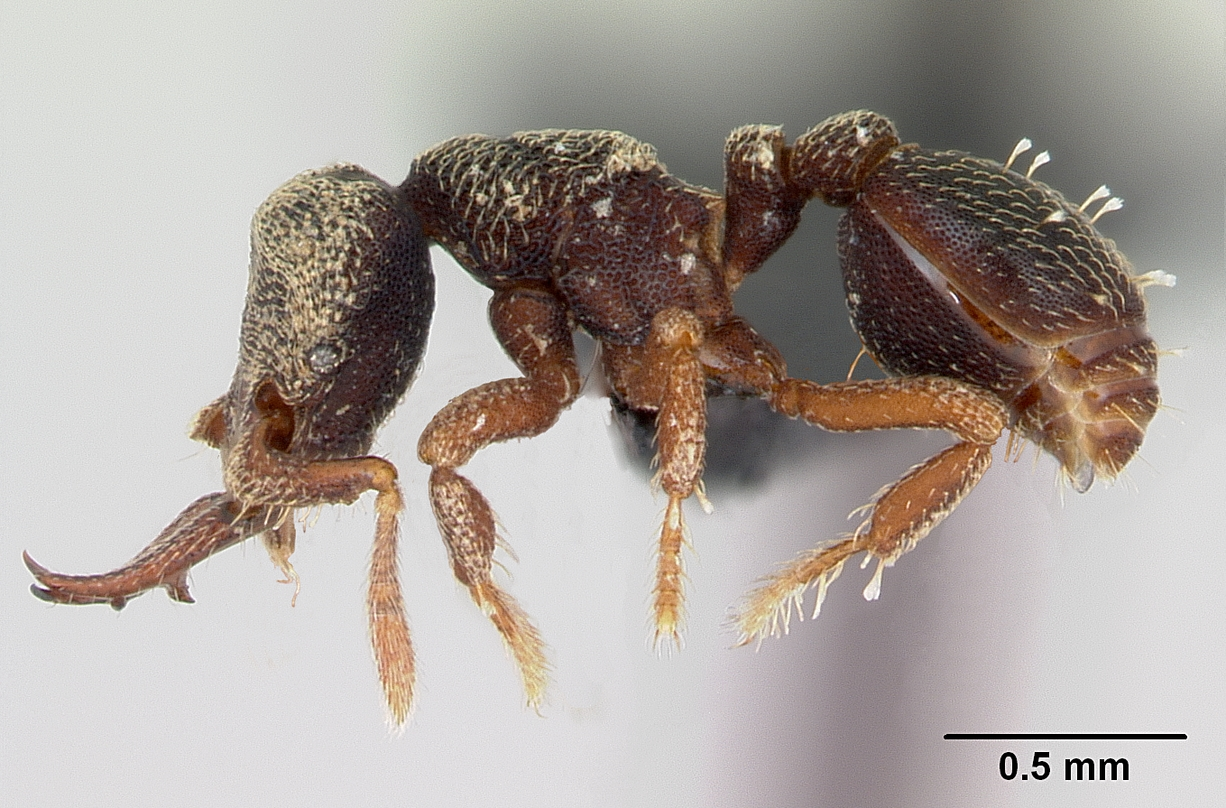
- Protalaridris armata worker

Scientific classification
- Domain: Eukaryota
- Kingdom: Animalia
- Phylum: Arthropoda
- Class: Insecta
- Order: Hymenoptera
- Family: Formicidae
- Subfamily: Myrmicinae
- Tribe: Attini
- Genus: Protalaridris; Brown, 1980
- Species: P. armata

Binomial name
- Protalaridris armata Brown, 1980

= Protalaridris =

Genus of ants

Protalaridris is a genus of ant in the subfamily Myrmicinae containing the single species Protalaridris armata. The genus is known from wet forests of Ecuador and Colombia.
