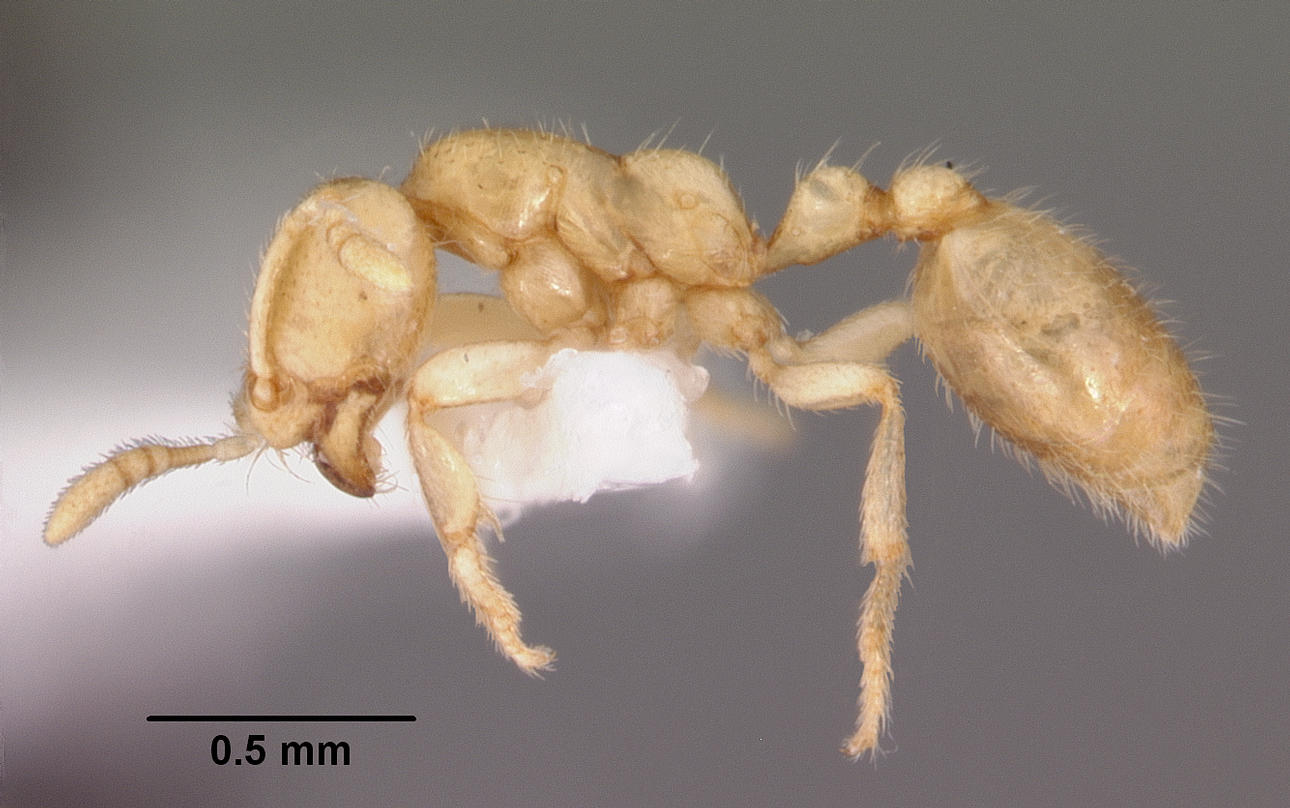
- Dolopomyrmex pilatus worker

Scientific classification
- Domain: Eukaryota
- Kingdom: Animalia
- Phylum: Arthropoda
- Class: Insecta
- Order: Hymenoptera
- Family: Formicidae
- Subfamily: Myrmicinae
- Tribe: Solenopsidini
- Genus: Dolopomyrmex; Cover & Deyrup, 2007
- Species: D. pilatus

Binomial name
- Dolopomyrmex pilatus Cover & Deyrup, 2007

= Dolopomyrmex =

Genus of ants

Dolopomyrmex is a genus of ants in the subfamily Myrmicinae containing the single species Dolopomyrmex pilatus.

== Distribution and habitat ==
The genus is known from the western and the southwestern United States, where the ants live in arid desert habitats, likely with an almost exclusively subterranean life style.

== Etymology ==
The genus name is derived from ancient Greek dolops, dolopos ("lurker in ambush") + Greek myrmex, myrmekos ("ant"); the specific name of the type species (D. pilatus) is derived from the pilum (a javelin commonly used by the Roman army), making Dolopomyrmex pilatus the "spear-bearing ambush ant".
