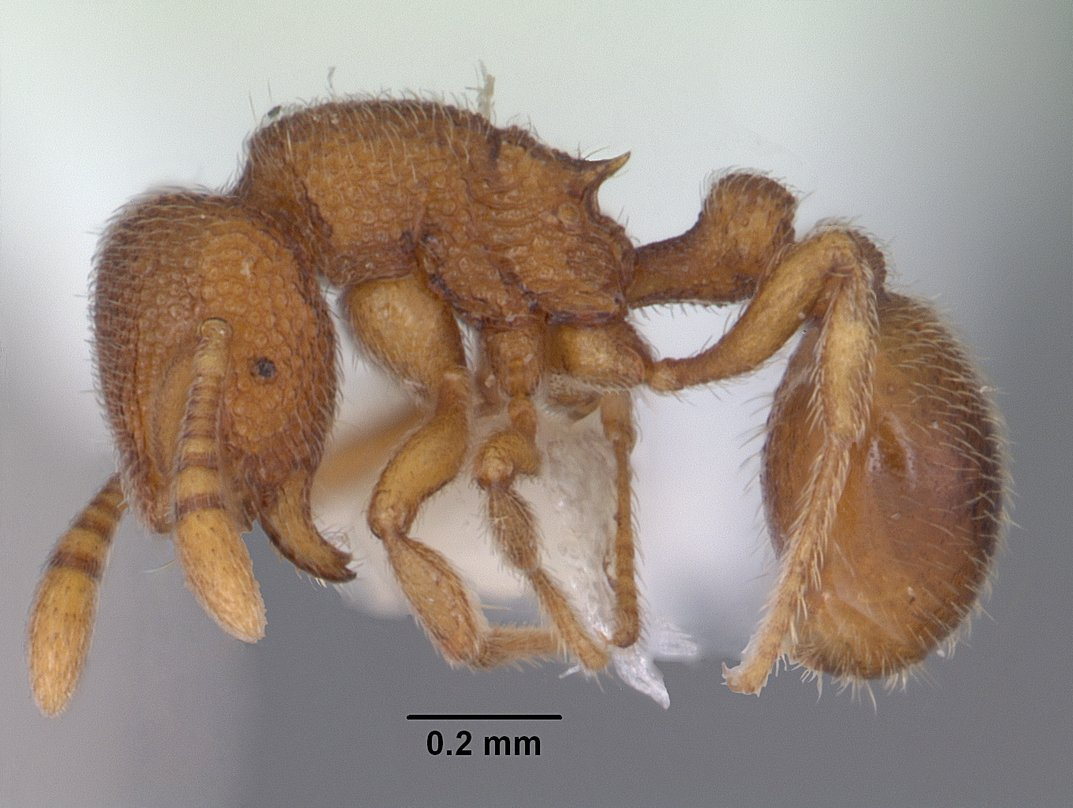
- Rostromyrmex pasohensis worker

Scientific classification
- Kingdom: Animalia
- Phylum: Arthropoda
- Class: Insecta
- Order: Hymenoptera
- Family: Formicidae
- Subfamily: Myrmicinae
- Tribe: Crematogastrini
- Genus: Rostromyrmex; Rosciszewski, 1994
- Species: R. pasohensis

Binomial name
- Rostromyrmex pasohensis Rosciszewski, 1994

= Rostromyrmex =

Genus of ants

Rostromyrmex is a genus of myrmicine ants containing the single species Rostromyrmex pasohensis. The genus is known from Peninsular Malaysia, where the ants live in the leaf litter with colonies located in rotten wood on the forest floor. Colonies are small and likely monogynous.
