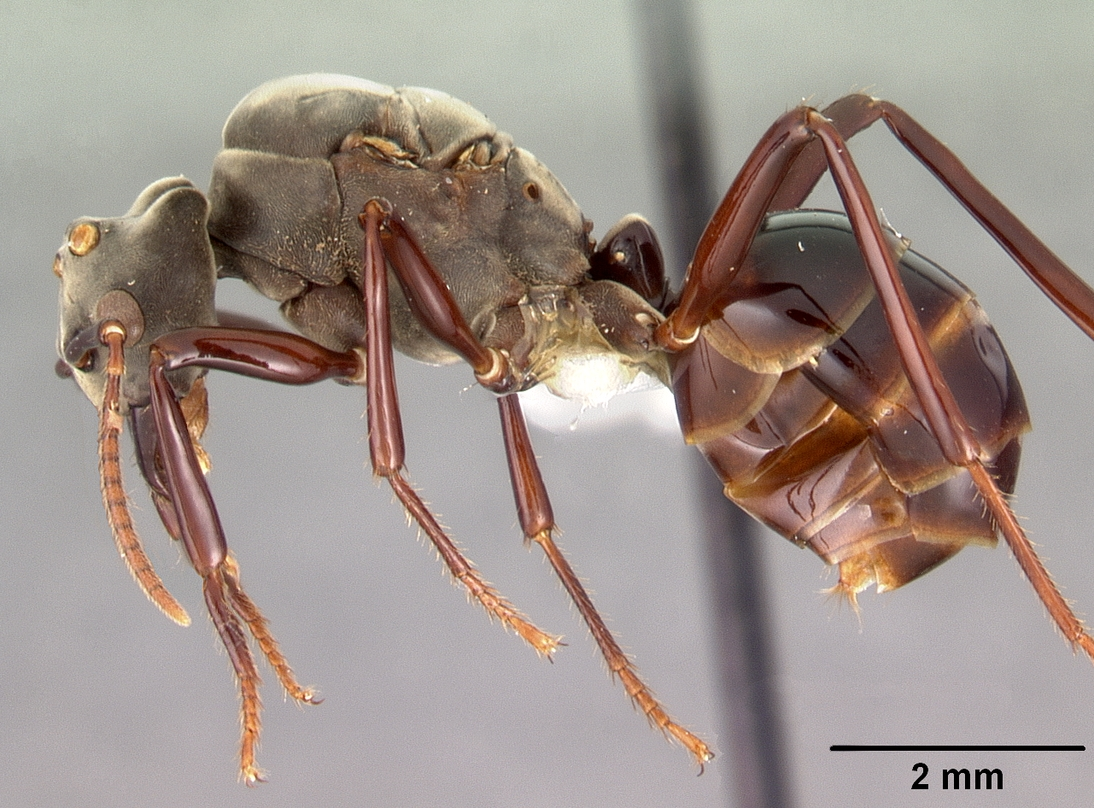
- Bregmatomyrma carnosa dealate queen

Scientific classification
- Domain: Eukaryota
- Kingdom: Animalia
- Phylum: Arthropoda
- Class: Insecta
- Order: Hymenoptera
- Family: Formicidae
- Subfamily: Formicinae
- Tribe: Plagiolepidini
- Genus: Bregmatomyrma; Wheeler, 1929
- Species: B. carnosa

Binomial name
- Bregmatomyrma carnosa Wheeler, 1929

= Bregmatomyrma =

Genus of ants

Bregmatomyrma is a genus of ants in the subfamily Formicinae. It contains the single species Bregmatomyrma carnosa, known only from queens from Borneo.
