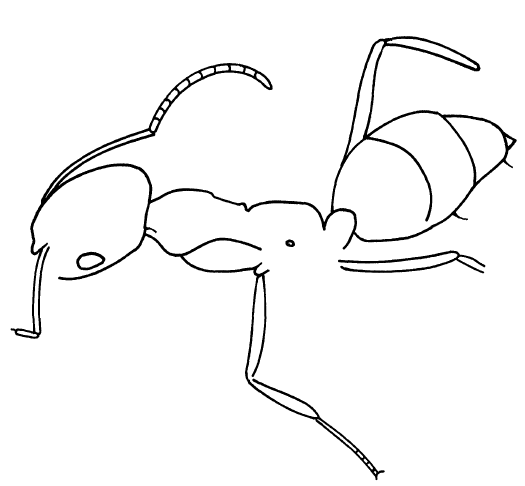
- Protrechina carpenteri holotype worker

Scientific classification
- Kingdom: Animalia
- Phylum: Arthropoda
- Clade: Pancrustacea
- Class: Insecta
- Order: Hymenoptera
- Family: Formicidae
- Subfamily: Formicinae
- Genus: †Protrechina; Wilson, 1985
- Species: †P. carpenteri

Binomial name
- †Protrechina carpenteri Wilson, 1985

= Protrechina =

Protrechina Temporal range: Middle Eocene

Genus of ant

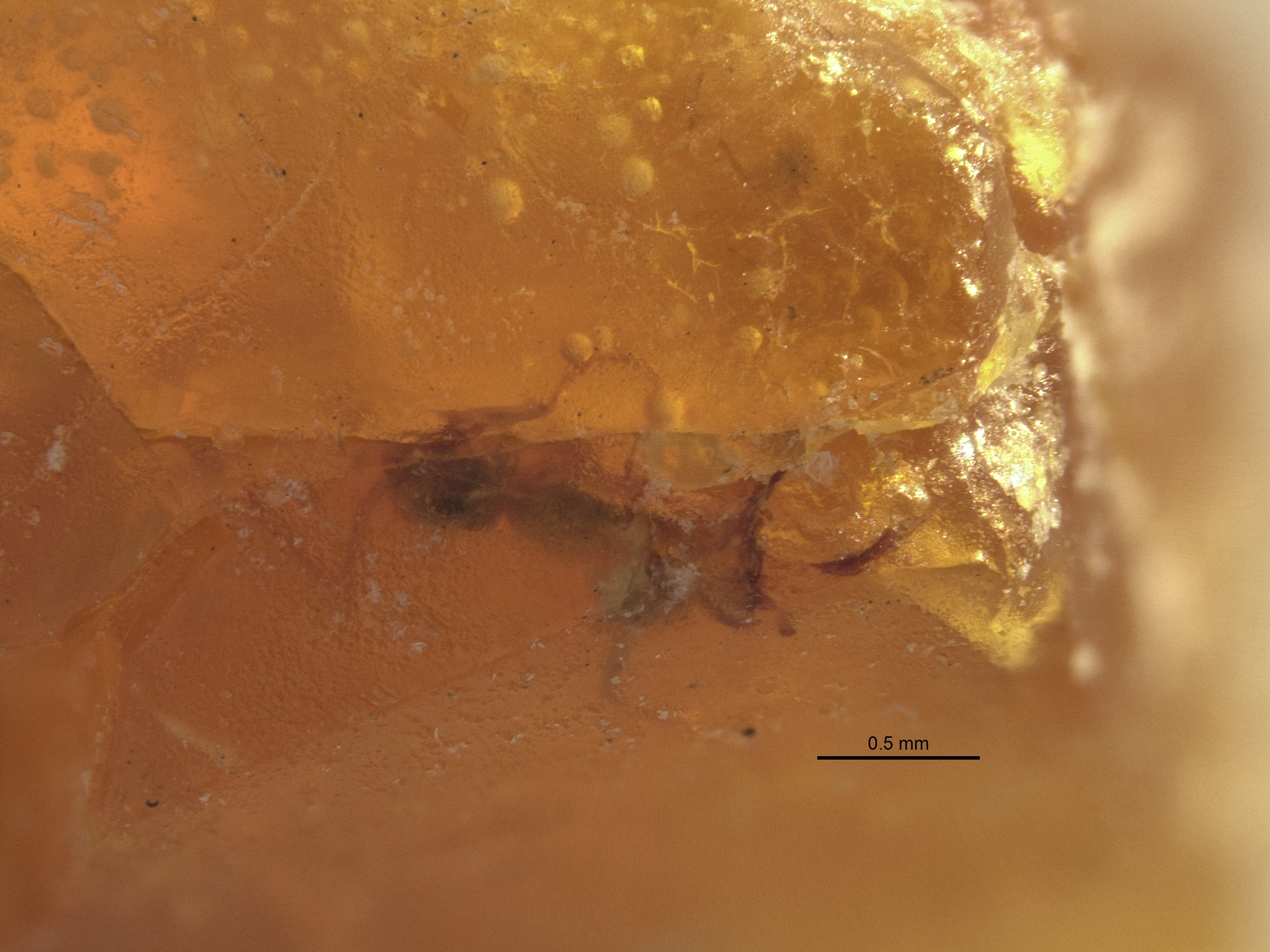
holotype in amber

Protrechina is an extinct, monotypic genus of ant, first described by Wilson (1985) from a Middle Eocene fossil found near Malvern, Arkansas. The genus contains a single described species Protrechina carpenteri known from a solitary worker entombed in Claiborne Formation amber.
