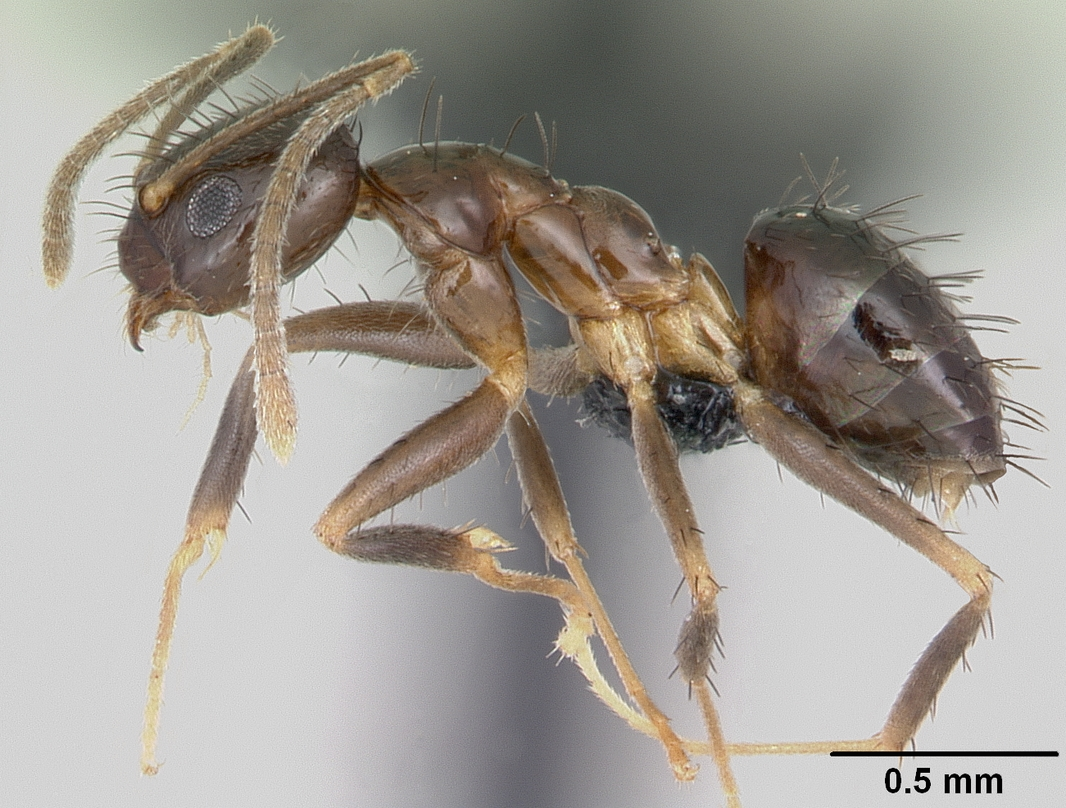
- N. vividula worker

Scientific classification
- Kingdom: Animalia
- Phylum: Arthropoda
- Class: Insecta
- Order: Hymenoptera
- Family: Formicidae
- Subfamily: Formicinae
- Tribe: Lasiini
- Genus: Nylanderia; Emery, 1906

Type species
- Formica vividula Nylander, 1846

Diversity
- 110 species

Synonyms
- Andragnathus Emery, 1922

= Nylanderia =

Nylanderia Temporal range: 42–0 Ma Middle Eocene – Recent

Genus of ants

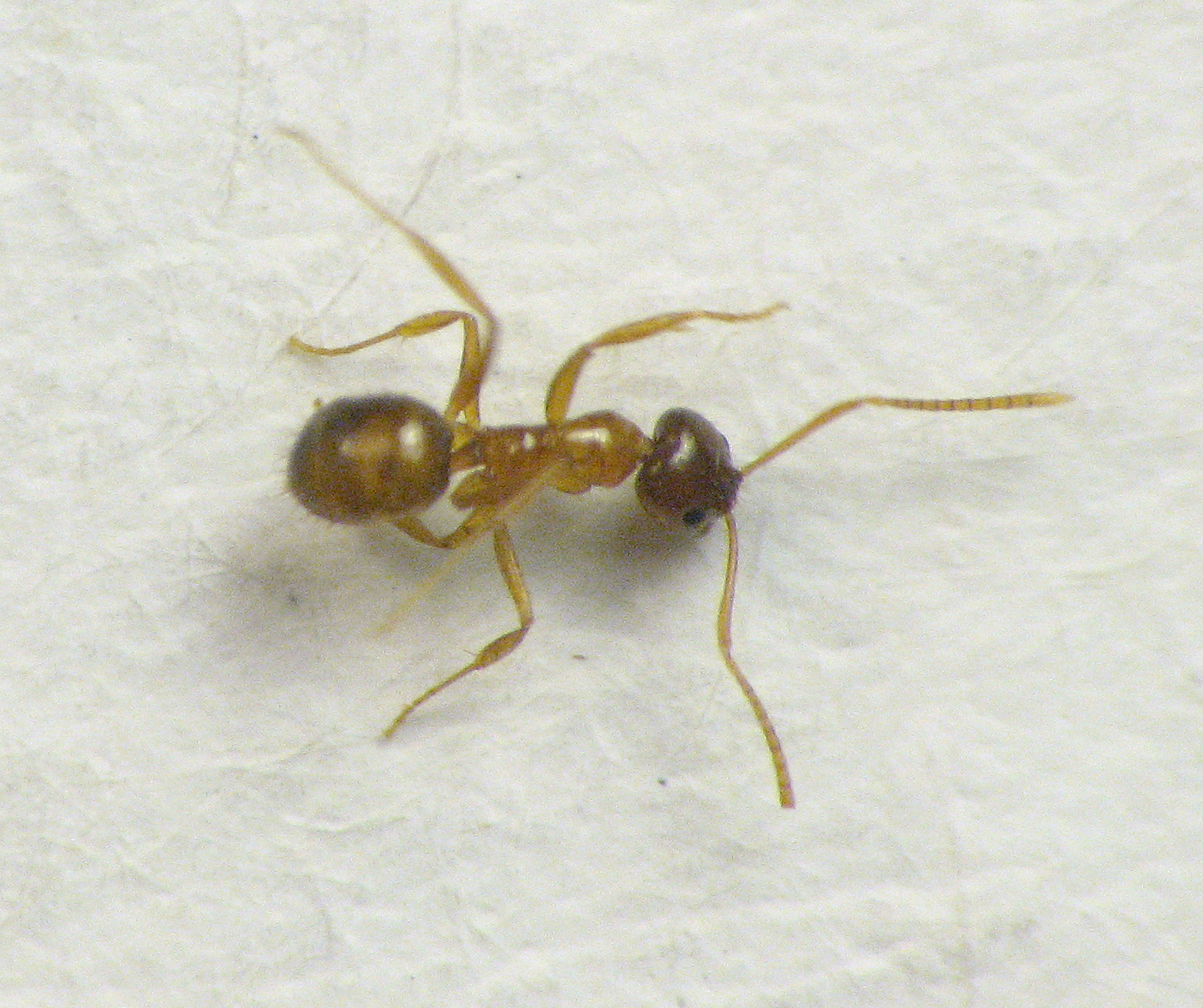
N. flavipes

Nylanderia is a large genus of ants in the subfamily Formicinae. The genus has a nearly cosmopolitan distribution with species inhabiting a wide array of habitats in almost all geographic regions. Nylanderia, currently containing over 110 species, is an ecologically important genus, with some species reported as being invasive. The ants are small to medium in size and range in color from pale yellow to black.

== Taxonomy ==
The genus was first described as a subgenus of Prenolepis by Emery (1906), a status he revised a couple of years later when he placed it as subgenus of Paratrechina (Emery, 1925). Wheeler (1936) raised Nylanderia to genus, where it remained until Brown (1973) provisionally placed it as a junior synonym of Paratrechina, a status which was later confirmed by Trager (1984). Nylanderia was finally revived from synonymy and restored at the rank of genus by LaPolla, Brady & Shattuck (2010).

Until 2010, most Nylanderia species were placed in the genus Paratrechina, but molecular phylogenic studies and reassessment of morphological characters prompted resurrection of Nylanderia as a valid genus. The genus currently comprises over 108 extant species and two fossil species: N. pygmaea from Eocene age Baltic amber and N. vetula from Miocene age Dominican amber.

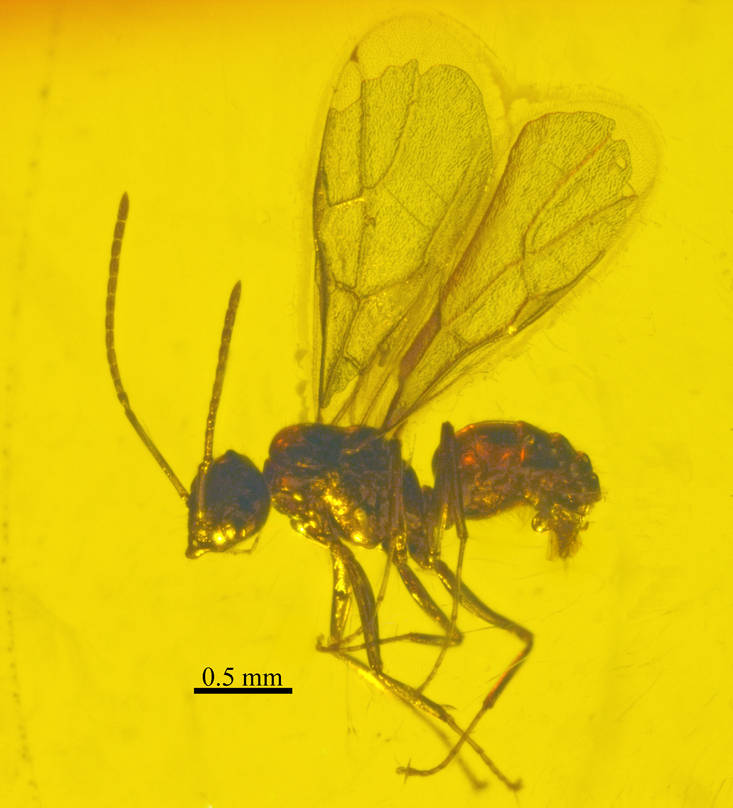
Nylanderia pygmaea fossil from Baltic amber, mid Eocene.

== Phylogenetics ==
After examining the phylogenetic relationships of Nylanderia and related genera, LaPolla, Brady & Shattuck (2011) placed Nylanderia within a well-defined Prenolepis-genus group containing Euprenolepis, Nylanderia, Paratrechina (sensu stricto), Paraparatrechina, Prenolepis, and Pseudolasius. They found that Paratrechina (sensu lato) was polyphyletic and segregated into three distinct, robust clades: Paratrechina (sensu stricto), Paraparatrechina, and Nylanderia. The sister taxon to Nylanderia was found to be a clade containing three genera: (Pseudolasius + (Euprenolepis + Paratrechina)).

Cladogram of the Prenolepis genus-group based on LaPolla, Brady & Shattuck (2010) and LaPolla, Kallal & Brady (2012): (Note: In LaPolla, Brady & Shattuck (2011), Zatania had not yet been formally described and was listed as Caribbean "Prenolepis".)

- - - - Zatania
      - Paraparatrechina
    - - Nylanderia
      - - Pseudolasius
        - - Euprenolepis
          - Paratrechina

== Distribution ==
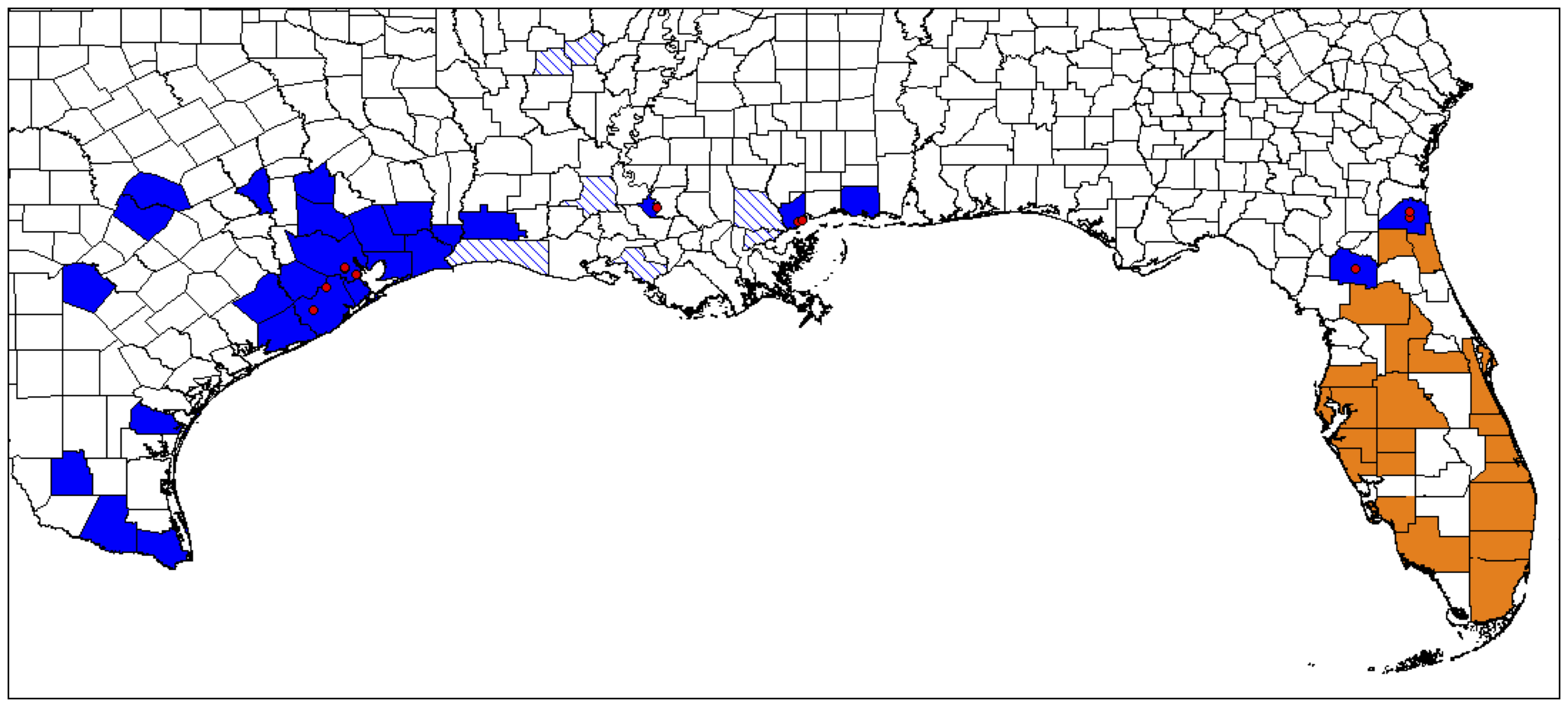
Reported distribution of the invasive Rasberry crazy ant (Nylanderia fulva) in the United States

Nylanderia is a large, ecologically important ant genus with a nearly cosmopolitan distribution. The ants are found in all geographic regions (with the exception of high-latitude areas), but is notably absent from Europe. Species inhabit a wide array of habitats from deserts to rainforests, although they reach their highest species diversity in forested and warmer environments. Nylanderia species are among the most abundant ant species in many places where they occur. For example, Ward (2000) found that Nylanderia (recorded as Paratrechina) was the fifth-most frequently encountered ant genus in leaf-litter samples from around the world.

=== As pests ===
Several Nylanderia species have been reported as being tramps. For example, N. bourbonica and N. vaga are commonly encountered in the tropics and subtropics and have spread across large areas. Infestations can involve smaller areas, although population sizes can be very large, as with N. pubens (Caribbean crazy ant) in the Caribbean. A Nylanderia species has invaded Texas and several other states in Southeastern United States in a sudden, explosive outbreak. Several other species in the genus have also been reported as introduced outside their native range, including N. clandestina, N. flavipes, N. fulva (Rasberry crazy), N. guatemalensis, and N. vividula.

== Biology ==
They are efficient and rapid foragers and often find resources (e.g. baits) first to which they can recruit rapidly, but rarely can defend a resource against other ants that arrive later to baits. Most are conspicuous, epigaeic (living or foraging primarily above ground) generalist species that form large, polydomous nests. Frequent nest movements are known for some species, especially those that nest in leaf litter and rotting wood. For example, N. bourbonica can nest opportunistically in temporary sites that are habitable for only a few days or weeks. The small (125–150 individuals) colonies of N. faisonensis also inhabit ephemeral locations in the leaf litter or soil of hardwood forests. A few more morphologically specialized species exist, such as the sand-dwelling N. arenivaga and N. phantasma from the southeastern United States, several small-eyed species such as N. microps from Puerto Rico, and several undescribed species from Australia. At least three currently undescribed workerless social parasites are known from the eastern United States.

In temperate areas, most Nylanderia species produce reproductives during the summer, which overwinter in the nest to then emerge early the following spring; Nylanderia species are typically among the first ant reproductives to fly after Prenolepis. However, little is known about the reproductive biology of many Nylanderia species, especially those inhabiting the tropics. Cases of polygyny have been noted among Nylanderia species, but how widespread this condition is within the genus remains unclear. At least one species, N. flavipes, is somewhat unusual among ants in having populations that are both monogynous (single queen) and polygynous (multiple queens).

== Description ==
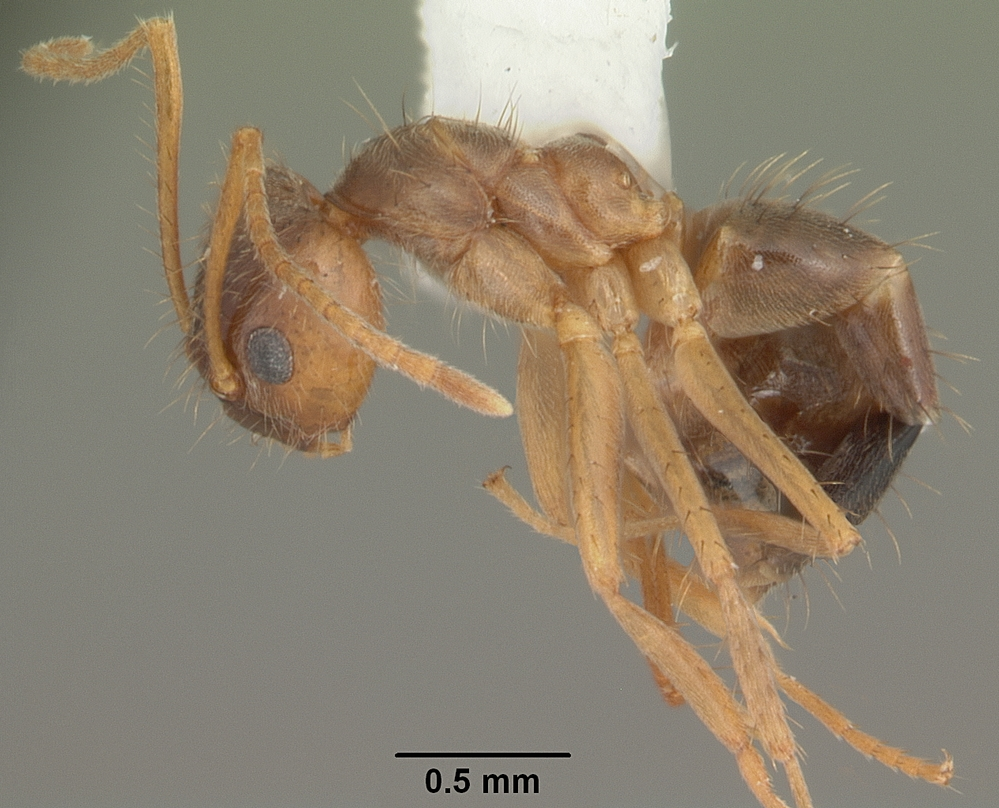
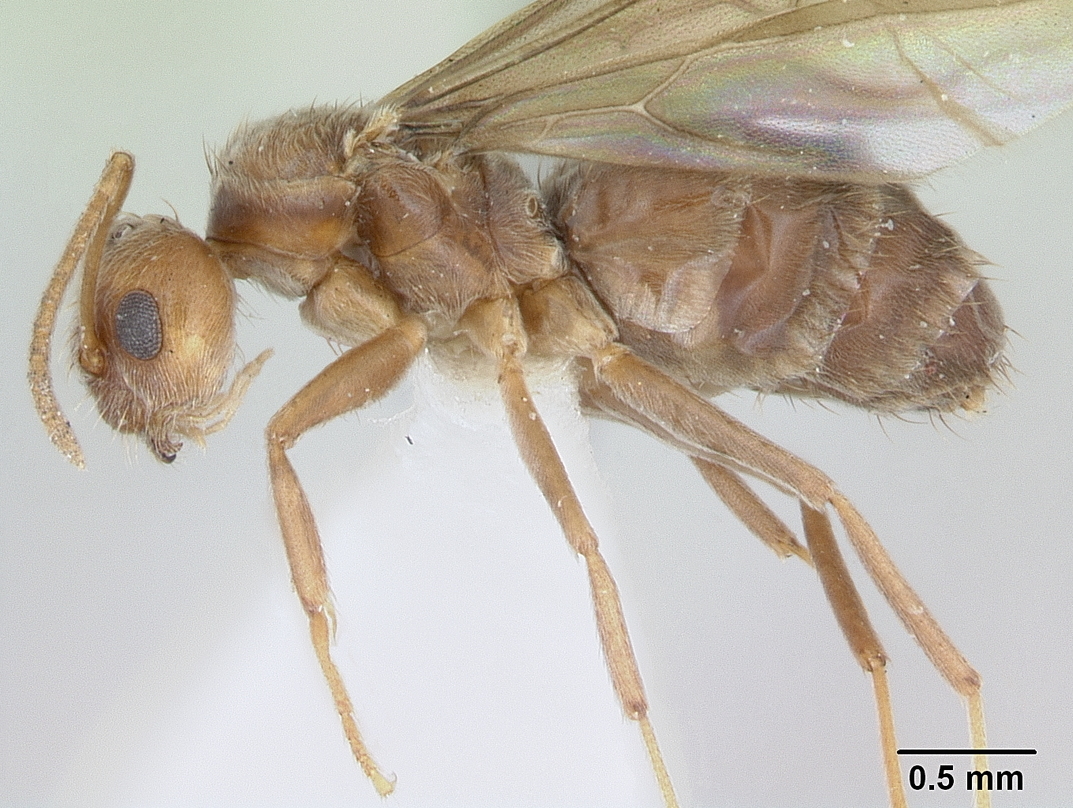
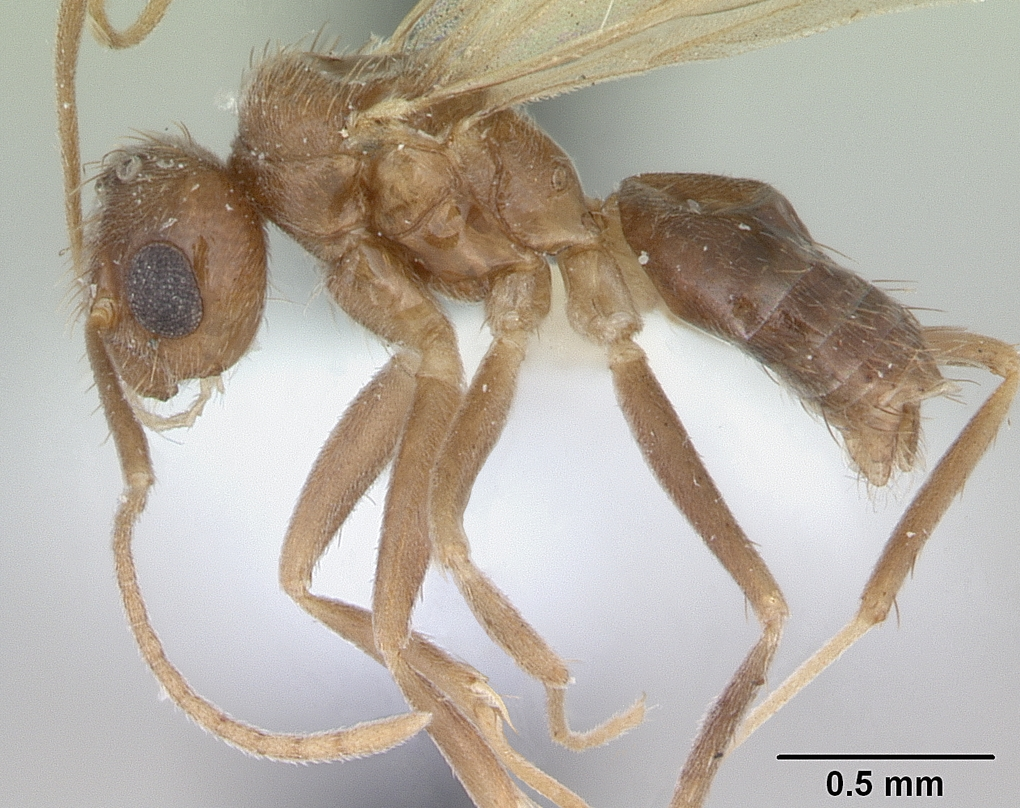
Worker, queen and male (Nylanderia pubens)

Nylanderia ants are small to medium-sized (generally between 1 and 4 mm in total length) and range in color from pale yellow to black.

=== Workers ===
Workers are generally monomorphic, although some species are variable in size, with a possible example of worker polymorphism observed in N. amblyops from Madagascar. Nylanderia workers can generally be easily distinguished from other formicines based on the presence of six mandibular teeth, erect macrosetae on the scapes and legs, and paired erect macrosetae on the pronotum and mesonotum. These morphological features are considered synapomorphies for the genus, and will effectively separate this genus from other genera. Overall, the body shape for most Nylanderia workers is compact and robust in that the mesosomal regions are generally short (as measured against the long axis of the body) and relatively high when compared to a species such as Paratrechina longicornis. There are, however, several species where the mesosoma is more elongated, superficially resembling Paratrechina longicornis. Long erect macrosetae are almost never found on the dorsal face of the propodeum, with one known exception. However, species with an elongated mesosoma or short propodeal macrosetae do possess six mandibular teeth, erect macrosetae on the scapes and legs, and paired erect macrosetae on the pronotum and mesonotum which support their placement within Nylanderia based on the definition of the genus proposed above. Additionally, when macrosetae are present on the propodeum, they show a pattern generally similar to that found on the pronotum and mesonotum of Nylanderia, with the macrosetae being numerous and of varying lengths. This is in contrast to related genera, for example Paraparatrechina, where the macrosetae are limited to a single, distinct pair. Given the differences in the patterns of these macrosetae among these genera, and when considering additional characters as outlined above, LaPolla, Brady & Shattuck 2011 (2011) interpreted the presence of macrosetae on the propodeum within Nylanderia as having arisen independently from those observed in other closely related genera.

=== Queens ===
The main features used to distinguish Nylanderia queens from other Prenolepis genus-group genera come primarily from the mandibles and scapes. Like workers, Nylanderia queens have erect macrosetae on their scapes. However, the macrosetae are often not as distinct as in workers because the macrosetae are often shorter and usually surrounded by a thick layer of decumbent pubescence. When considering genera such as Euprenolepis and Pseudolasius in which queens also possess macrosetae on the scapes, differences in mandibular tooth count will distinguish Nylanderia queens. Five teeth are present in Euprenolepis queens and five or fewer in Pseudolasius, while Nylanderia possesses six (or rarely seven) teeth. In other genera such as Paratrechina and Paraparatrechina, the queens have no erect macrosetae on their scapes. For Prenolepis, if erect macrosetae are present on the scapes, the more posterior placement of the eyes distinguishes them from Nylanderia.

=== Males ===
Males of Nylanderia can be more difficult to distinguish from other Prenolepis genus-group genera because considerable variation occurs in the genitalic structures at the species level for all genera, and features such as mandibular dentition are not useful since dentition is always reduced in males from that observed in workers and queens (usually to one or two teeth). The scapes can be useful in separating male Nylanderia from some Prenolepis genus-group genera since they possess macrosetae similar to those found in workers and queens, but at reduced numbers. Paratrechina and Paraparatrechina males, like workers and queens of these genera, never have macrosetae on their scapes. In general, Nylanderia males have subtriangular parameres, but similar-shaped parameres are also seen in some species of Euprenolepis, Prenolepis, and Pseudolasius. Both Euprenolepis and Pseudolasius have reduced labial and maxillary palp numbers from the more typical six maxillary and four labial palps observed in other Prenolepis genus-group genera. For Prenolepis the separation of males from Nylanderia is unclear, largely because for the vast majority of Prenolepis species the males are unknown. Separation of the widespread North American Prenolepis imparis from Nylanderia is based on the extremely short scapes (not much longer than the head) that lack macrosetae.

== Species ==
- Nylanderia amblyops (Forel, 1892)
- Nylanderia amia (Forel, 1913)
- Nylanderia anthracina (Roger, 1863)
- Nylanderia arenivaga (Wheeler, 1905)
- Nylanderia aseta (Forel, 1902)
- Nylanderia assimilis (Jerdon, 1851)
- Nylanderia austroccidua (Trager, 1984)
- Nylanderia birmana (Forel, 1902)
- Nylanderia birmana hodgsoni (Forel, 1902)
- Nylanderia boltoni LaPolla, Hawkes & Fisher, 2011
- Nylanderia bourbonica (Forel, 1886)
- Nylanderia brasiliensis (Mayr, 1862)
- Nylanderia braueri (Mayr, 1868)
- Nylanderia bruesii (Wheeler, 1903)
- Nylanderia burgesi (Trager, 1984)
- Nylanderia caeciliae (Forel, 1899)
- Nylanderia clandestina (Mayr, 1870)
- Nylanderia colchica (Pisarski, 1960)
- Nylanderia comorensis (Forel, 1907)
- Nylanderia concinna (Trager, 1984)
- Nylanderia darlingtoni Wheeler, 1936
- Nylanderia dichroa Wheeler, 1934
- Nylanderia dispar (Forel, 1909)
- Nylanderia docilis (Forel, 1908)
- Nylanderia dodo (Donisthorpe, 1946)
- Nylanderia dugasi (Forel, 1911)
- Nylanderia faisonensis (Forel, 1922)
- Nylanderia flavipes (Smith, 1874)
- Nylanderia formosae (Forel, 1912)
- Nylanderia fulva (Mayr, 1862)
- Nylanderia glabrior (Forel, 1902)
- Nylanderia goeldii (Forel, 1912)
- Nylanderia gracilis (Forel, 1892)
- Nylanderia guanyin (Terayama, 2009)
- Nylanderia guatemalensis (Forel, 1885)
- Nylanderia gulinensis (Zhang & Zheng, 2002)
- Nylanderia helleri (Viehmeyer, 1914)
- Nylanderia hubrechti (Emery, 1922)
- Nylanderia humbloti (Forel, 1891)
- Nylanderia hystrix (Trager, 1984)
- Nylanderia impolita LaPolla, Hawkes & Fisher, 2011
- Nylanderia incallida (Santschi, 1915)
- Nylanderia indica (Forel, 1894)
- Nylanderia integera (Zhou, 2001)
- Nylanderia jaegerskioeldi (Mayr, 1904)
- Nylanderia johannae (Forel, 1912)
- Nylanderia kraepelini (Forel, 1905)
- Nylanderia laevigata (MacKay, 1998)
- Nylanderia lepida (Santschi, 1915)
- Nylanderia lietzi (Forel, 1908)
- Nylanderia luteafra LaPolla, Hawkes & Fisher, 2011
- Nylanderia madagascarensis (Forel, 1886)
- Nylanderia magnella Kallal & LaPolla, 2012
- Nylanderia manni (Donisthorpe, 1941)
- Nylanderia mendica (Menozzi, 1942)
- Nylanderia mexicana (Forel, 1899)
- Nylanderia microps (Smith, 1937)
- Nylanderia mixta (Forel, 1897)
- Nylanderia myops (Mann, 1920)
- Nylanderia natalensis (Forel, 1915)
- Nylanderia nodifera (Mayr, 1870)
- Nylanderia nubatama (Terayama, 1999)
- Nylanderia nuggeti (Donisthorpe, 1941)
- Nylanderia obscura (Mayr, 1862)
- Nylanderia ogasawarensis (Terayama, 1999)
- Nylanderia opisopthalmia (Zhou & Zheng, 1998)
- Nylanderia otome (Terayama, 1999)
- Nylanderia parvula (Mayr, 1870)
- Nylanderia pearsei Wheeler, 1938
- Nylanderia perminuta (Buckley, 1866)
- Nylanderia phantasma (Trager, 1984)
- Nylanderia picta (Wheeler, 1927)
- Nylanderia pieli (Santschi, 1928)
- Nylanderia pubens (Forel, 1893)
- †Nylanderia pygmaea (Mayr, 1868)
- Nylanderia querna Kallal & LaPolla, 2012
- Nylanderia rosae (Forel, 1902)
- Nylanderia ryukyuensis (Terayama, 1999)
- Nylanderia sakurae (Ito, 1914)
- Nylanderia scintilla LaPolla, Hawkes & Fisher, 2011
- Nylanderia sharpii (Forel, 1899)
- Nylanderia sikorae (Forel, 1892)
- Nylanderia silvestrii (Emery, 1906)
- Nylanderia silvula LaPolla, Hawkes & Fisher, 2011
- Nylanderia simpliciuscula (Emery, 1896)
- Nylanderia sindbadi (Pisarski, 1960)
- Nylanderia smythiesii (Forel, 1894)
- Nylanderia staudingeri (Forel, 1912)
- Nylanderia steeli (Forel, 1910)
- Nylanderia steinheili (Forel, 1893)
- Nylanderia stigmatica (Mann, 1919)
- Nylanderia tasmaniensis (Forel, 1913)
- Nylanderia taylori (Forel, 1894)
- Nylanderia teranishii (Santschi, 1937)
- Nylanderia terricola (Buckley, 1866)
- Nylanderia tjibodana (Karavaiev, 1929)
- Nylanderia tococae (Wheeler & Bequaert, 1929)
- Nylanderia trageri Kallal & LaPolla, 2012
- Nylanderia umbella LaPolla, Hawkes & Fisher, 2011
- Nylanderia usambarica LaPolla, Hawkes & Fisher, 2011
- Nylanderia vaga (Forel, 1901)
- Nylanderia vagabunda (Motschoulsky, 1863)
- †Nylanderia vetula LaPolla & Dlussky, 2010
- Nylanderia vitiensis (Mann, 1921)
- Nylanderia vividula (Nylander, 1846)
- Nylanderia waelbroecki (Emery, 1899)
- Nylanderia wojciki (Trager, 1984)
- Nylanderia yaeyamensis (Terayama, 1999)
- Nylanderia yambaru (Terayama, 1999)
- Nylanderia yerburyi (Forel, 1894)

== Bibliography ==
- Brown, W. L. Jr. (1973). "A comparison of the Hylean and Congo-West African rain forest ant faunas". In Meggers, B. J.; Ayensu, E. S.; Duckworth, W. D. (eds.). Tropical forest ecosystems in Africa and South America: a comparative review. Washington, D.C.: Smithsonian Institution Press. pp. 161–185.
- Emery, C. (1906). "Note sur Prenolepis vividula Nyl. et sur la classification des espèces du genre Prenolepis". Annales de la Société Entomologique de Belgique. 50: 130–134. doi:10.5962/bhl.part.19942.
- Emery, C (1925). "Hymenoptera. Fam. Formicidae. Subfam. Formicinae". Genera Insectorum. 183: 1–302.
- Ichinose, K. (1986). "Occurrence of Polydomy in a Monogynous Ant, Paratrechina flavipes (Hymenoptera, Formicidae)". Kontyû. 54 (2): 208–217.
- LaPolla, J. S.; Dlussky, G. M. (2010a). "Review of fossil Prenolepis genus-group species (Hymenoptera: Formicidae)". Proceedings of the Entomological Society of Washington. 112 (2): 258–273. doi:10.4289/0013-8797-112.2.258. S2CID 86102815.
- LaPolla, J.S.; Brady, S.G.; Shattuck, S.O. (2010b). "Phylogeny and taxonomy of the Prenolepis genus-group of ants (Hymenoptera: Formicidae)". Systematic Entomology. 35: 118–131. Bibcode:2010SysEn..35..118L. doi:10.1111/j.1365-3113.2009.00492.x. S2CID 86659687.
- LaPolla, J. S.; Kallal, R. J.; Brady, S. G. (2012). "A new ant genus from the Greater Antilles and Central America, Zatania (Hymenoptera: Formicidae), exemplifies the utility of male and molecular character systems". Systematic Entomology. 37: 200–214. Bibcode:2012SysEn..37..200L. doi:10.1111/j.1365-3113.2011.00605.x. S2CID 84919642.
- Trager, J. C (1984). "A revision of the genus Paratrechina (Hymenoptera: Formicidae) of the continental United States". Sociobiology. 9: 49–162.
- Wheeler, W. M. (1936). "Ants from Hispaniola and Mona Island". Bulletin of the Museum of Comparative Zoology. 80: 195–211.
- Ward, P.S. (2000). "Broad-scale patterns of diversity in leaf-litter ant communities.". In Agosti, D.; Majer, J.D.; Alonso, L.A.; Schultz, T.R. (eds.). Ants: Standard Methods for Measuring and Monitoring Biodiversity. Washington, D.C.: Smithsonian Institution Press. pp. 99–121.
- This article incorporates text published under Creative Commons Attribution 3.0 Unported License: LaPolla, John S.; Brady, Seán G.; Shattuck, Steven O. (2011), "Monograph of Nylanderia (Hymenoptera: Formicidae) of the World: An introduction to the systematics and biology of the genus." (PDF), Zootaxa, 3110: 1–9, doi:10.11646/zootaxa.3110.1.1
