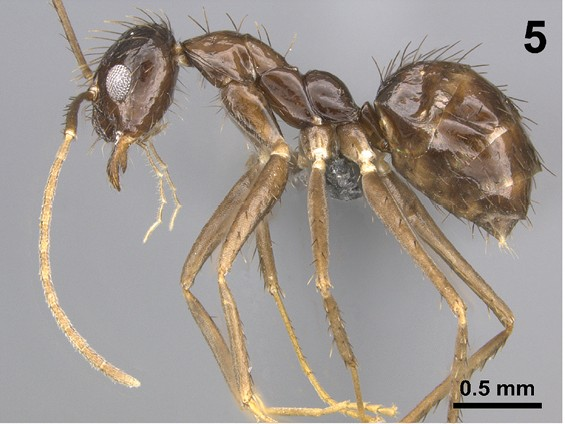
- Worker

Scientific classification
- Domain: Eukaryota
- Kingdom: Animalia
- Phylum: Arthropoda
- Class: Insecta
- Order: Hymenoptera
- Family: Formicidae
- Subfamily: Formicinae
- Genus: Paratrechina
- Species: P. zanjensis

Binomial name
- Paratrechina zanjensis LaPolla, Hawkes & Fisher, 2013

= Paratrechina zanjensis =

Species of ant

Paratrechina zanjensis is an African species of ant in the genus Paratrechina. It is one of two species in the genus, the other being the longhorn crazy ant (Paratrechina longicornis).

== Habitat and distribution ==
The species in known from Tanzania, Angola and Mozambique. Very little is known about the natural history of Paratrechina zanjensis; the 23 specimens collected in the Mkuju River region of the Selous Game Reserve in Tanzania were all found in 48-hour pitfall trap samples while none were found in the 40 Winkler-extracted leaf litter samples collected during daytime along the same transects. The two Tanzanian sites in which Paratrechina zanjensis were found were representative of mature dry miombo woodland, while they appeared to be absent from both dry and moist closed canopy forest sites nearby. The Angola and Mozambique specimens were also collected in miombo woodlands; this, in combination with the absence of Paratrechina zanjensis from 15 forest sites surveyed in the Eastern Arc Mountains and Coastal Forests of Tanzania, suggests that the species prefers open woodland rather than forest habitats.

== Identification ==
The worker of Paratrechina zanjensis can easily be separated from Paratrechina longicornis based on the presence of erect macrosetae on the scapes. There are several other notable differences between the two species. The propodeal dorsal face of Paratrechina zanjensis is more convex than is observed in Paratrechina longicornis. Similarly, the pronotum and to a lesser degree the mesonotum are more convex in Paratrechina zanjensis, being almost flat in Paratrechina longicornis. The metanotal area is also longer and more distinct in Paratrechina zanjensis, being more strongly separated from the mesonotum and propodeum. Paratrechina zanjensis has erect macrosetae that are dark rather than pale as in Paratrechina longicornis, the body is glossier, and largely lacks the opalescent sheen / iridescence that is characteristic of Paratrechina longicornis. Paratrechina zanjensis is superficially similar to Nylanderia silvula, but can readily be distinguished from this species by its mandibular dentition (5 teeth in Paratrechina, 6 in Nylanderia), larger eyes, longer limbs and less strongly domed propodeum.

Male and queens for Paratrechina zanjensis remain unknown.
