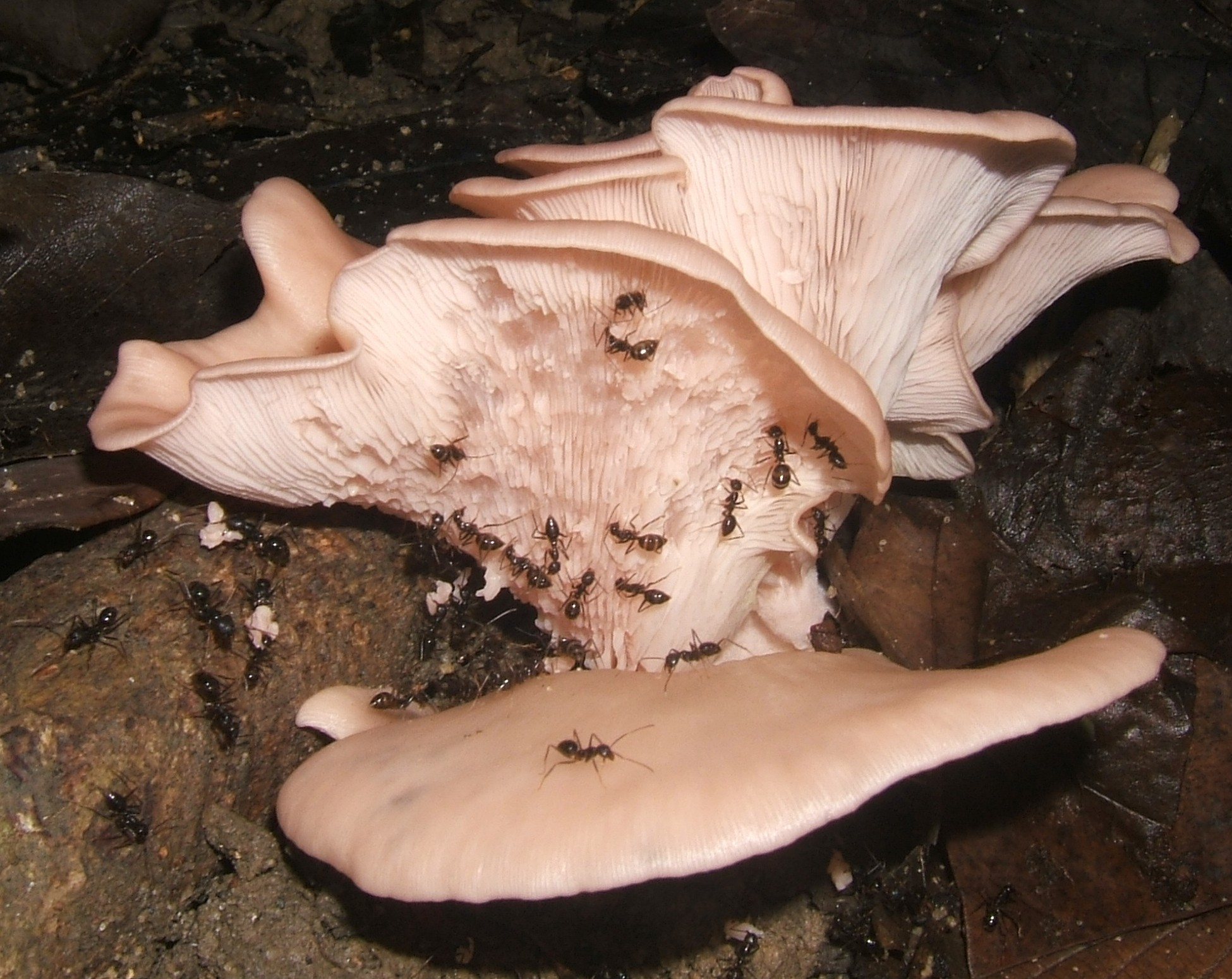
- Workers of Euprenolepis procera feeding on a Pleurotus mushroom

Scientific classification
- Kingdom: Animalia
- Phylum: Arthropoda
- Class: Insecta
- Order: Hymenoptera
- Family: Formicidae
- Subfamily: Formicinae
- Genus: Euprenolepis
- Species: E. procera

Binomial name
- Euprenolepis procera (Emery, 1900)

Synonyms
- Prenolepis (Euprenolepis) procera Emery, 1900; Paratrechina (Euprenolepis) procera (Emery, 1900); Camponotus (Myrmosphincta) antespectans Forel, 1913; Prenolepis (Euprenolepis) antespectans (Forel, 1913); Paratrechina (Euprenolepis) antespectans (Forel, 1913); Euprenolepis antespectans (Forel, 1913)

= Euprenolepis procera =

Species of ant

Euprenolepis procera is a species of ant found in the rainforests of South East Asia. It was first described by Carlo Emery, an Italian entomologist, in 1900. In 2008, Witte & Maschwitz discovered that E. procera specialises in harvesting mushrooms in the rainforest for food, representing a new, previously unreported feeding strategy in ants.

== Distribution ==
Euprenolepis procera is endemic to South East Asia, being found in the rainforests of Malaysia, Thailand and Indonesia. In Malaysia, where they have been studied, individual colonies were recorded to occur at a density of one nest per approximately 150 m^{2}, but Witte & Maschwitz stated this may be an underestimate as they may not have discovered some colonies.

== Taxonomy ==
This species was first described in 1900 by Carlo Emery, under the name Prenolepis procera; Emery based his description on material collected by the Italian anthropologist Elio Modigliani in his travels in Malesia. Emery assigned the species to the subgenus Euprenolepis in 1905, and moved that subgenus to the genus Paratrechina in 1925. In 1995, Bolton raised the subgenus to the rank of genus, giving the species its current name.

In 1913, Auguste-Henri Forel described a new species, Camponotus (Myrmosphincta) antespectans, which was also moved to Euprenolepis by Emery. This is now considered a synonym of E. procera.

== Description ==
=== Workers ===
The workers are polymorphic, consisting of a minor (body length = 3.5–4.5 millimetres or 0.14–0.18 inches) and major caste (body length = 5–6 mm or 0.20–0.24 in); the major caste is relatively rare compared to the minor caste. The workers' heads are heart-shaped, broader than they are long and a "dark-reddish brown" colour. The antennae of both worker castes are made up of twelve segments and are a lighter colour than their heads, their mandibles have five teeth. The major workers superficially resemble species of Pseudolasius.

=== Reproductive castes ===
The queens and males have larger eyes than the workers, and also have three pronounced simple eyes as well. The queens are covered in a dense layer of hairs. The antennae of the males are made of thirteen segments, unlike twelve in workers, and their mandibles have only one well-developed tooth. The queens are a similar colour to the workers, but have mottled areas that are a lighter colour than the rest of the body.

== Behaviour ==
Euprenolepis procera is nocturnal, only foraging for food at night, venturing up to 40 metres (130 ft) from the nest, but on average around 12 m (40 ft). It lives in colonies of between 500 and 50,000 individuals, forming nests inside preformed cavities, rather than constructing nests themselves. They migrate regularly, staying in each location for between one and nine days; these migrations are thought to be necessary as the colony quickly depletes available food near its nest. Similar adaptations to unpredictable food resources are common to all harvester ants, but only seen in two other types of ant: army ants which migrate into new foraging areas and Dolichoderus transport their trophobiont mealybugs to parts of plants that are growing.

=== Feeding ===
Over 200 species of ants are known to eat fungi as a major part of their diet, but these ants in the Attini tribe have co-evolved with fungi, forming a mutualism that benefits both the fungus and the ants. Unlike similar ants found in the New World, E. procera does not cultivate fungi in its nest, but instead harvests the sporocarp of fungi (mushrooms) from the rainforest in which it lives as its primary source of food. It is the only species of ant known to have such a feeding habit. When it was first reported in 2008, Bert Hölldobler, an expert on ants, called the discovery "sensational" and said "nothing like that was known before". They have been observed to eat over 30 species of mushroom, but they also ignore 50 species present in their habitat; of those that they do eat, the mushrooms often occurred near the roots of trees, indicating that mycorrhizal fungi form part of their diet. During field observations only two occurrences of them feeding on animals (a grasshopper and a snail) were recorded, compared to 266 mushrooms which were consumed. In a laboratory study, colonies thrived for over thirteen weeks on a diet consisting only of Pleurotus and Agaricus mushrooms. Thus, the natural diet is believed to consist almost entirely of mushrooms. Feeding experiments demonstrated that they are able to live off a diet of honey or insects as well.

Once they locate mushrooms which they consider edible in the wild, they harvest them efficiently, removing over 70% of the mushroom within four hours. In a laboratory study, they almost completely harvested a Pleurotus mushroom that weighed 40 grams (1.4 oz) within three hours. Once they have harvested the mushrooms, they transport pieces of them back to their nest and arrange them into piles 1–4 cm (0.4–1.6 in) in diameter. Over time these piles turn from white to black, losing mass as workers continuously chew and feed on the fungi and in turn feed the ant larvae. The pulp has a distinctive sweet-sour odour which may be due to fermentation occurring. This food processing continues for around a week, depending on the size of the original pile of pieces. If the fungal material is kept away from the ants it quickly spoils, becoming infested by bacteria and smelling unpleasant, but when processed by the ants no spoiling has been observed. The exact mechanisms of the processing of fungi are under investigation.

They are thought to have evolved this feeding habit because few other animals eat mushrooms and therefore there is little competition for the food resource. When mushrooms were placed near nests of E. procera they were by far the main consumer of the mushrooms with other animals barely feeding on them.

== Ecological significance ==
The effects that harvesting of mushrooms by E. procera has on the ecosystem is currently unknown. They may have similar effects as ants that harvest seeds of plants, by changing the relative abundance of different fungal species.
