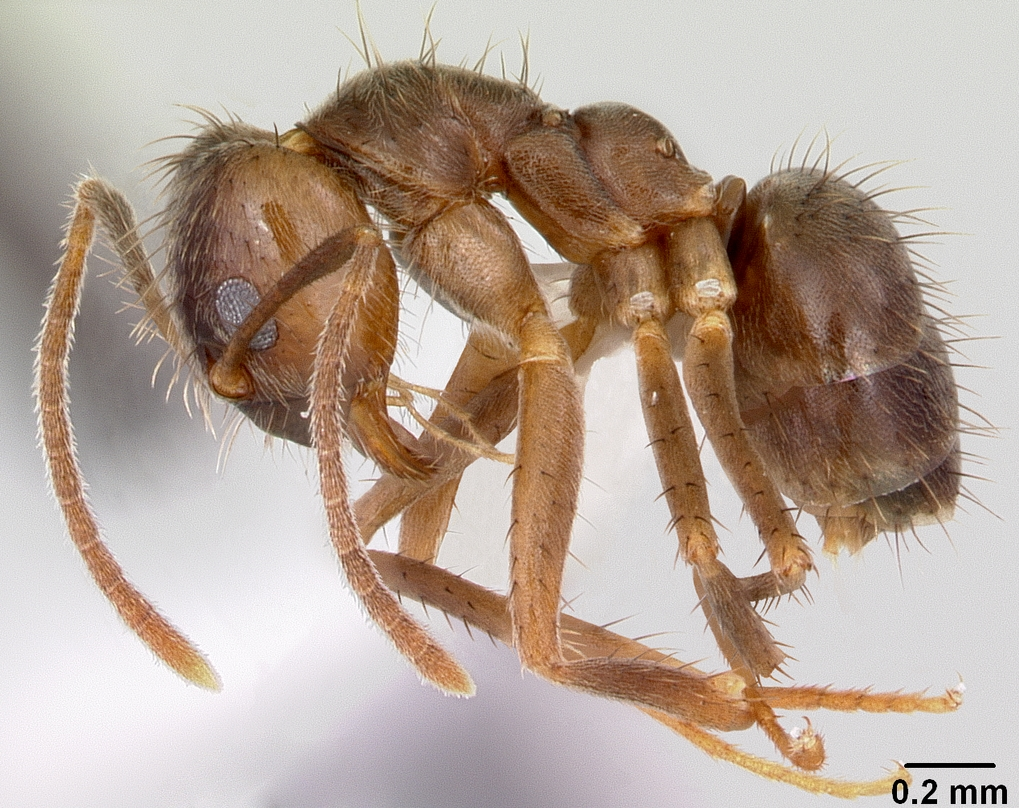

Scientific classification
- Kingdom: Animalia
- Phylum: Arthropoda
- Class: Insecta
- Order: Hymenoptera
- Family: Formicidae
- Subfamily: Formicinae
- Genus: Nylanderia
- Species: N. pubens

Binomial name
- Nylanderia pubens (Forel, 1893)

= Nylanderia pubens =

Species of ant

Nylanderia pubens is a species of ant of the genus Nylanderia, commonly called the Caribbean crazy ant. It was originally described as Paratrechina pubens from Saint Vincent, Lesser Antilles. This species was moved from Paratrechina to the genus Nylanderia in 2010.

These ants are about one-eighth inch long and are covered with reddish-brown hairs. The colonies have multiple queens. An infestation of this species, or a related species named Nylanderia fulva, is ongoing in and around Houston, Texas.

== Description ==
Nyladeria pubens is included in a group called "crazy ants" due to the quick and erratic movements they make. It is a 2.6 to 3 millimetres (13/128 to 15/128 in), monomorphic, reddish brown ant. Its antennae have 12 segments, and lack clubs. The antennal scape is nearly twice as large as the head. Its bite is not known to sting.

== See also ==
Similar ants

- Nylanderia fulva
- Prenolepis imparis
