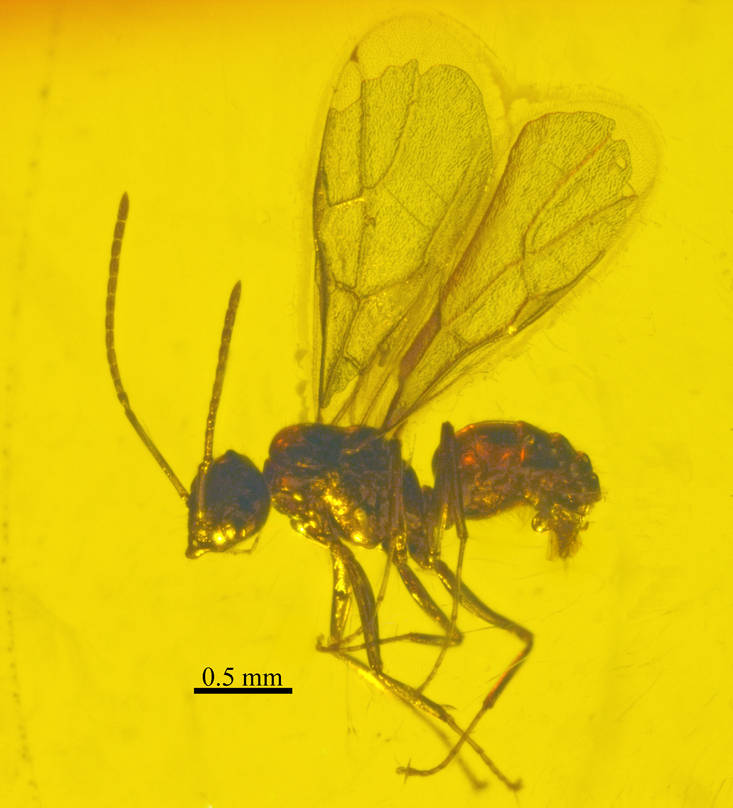
- Nylanderia pygmaea syntype male from the Prussian Formation, Kaliningrad Oblast, Russia

Scientific classification
- Domain: Eukaryota
- Kingdom: Animalia
- Phylum: Arthropoda
- Class: Insecta
- Order: Hymenoptera
- Family: Formicidae
- Subfamily: Formicinae
- Genus: Nylanderia
- Species: N. pygmaea

Binomial name
- Nylanderia pygmaea (Mayr, 1868)

Synonyms
- Prenolepis pygmaea; Paratrechina pygmaea

= Nylanderia pygmaea =

Nylanderia pygmaea Temporal range: Middle Eocene

Extinct species of ant

Nylanderia pygmaea is an extinct species of formicid in the ant subfamily Formicinae known from fossils found in the Prussian Formation of the Baltic region.

== History and classification ==
When described N. pygmaea was known from twenty males and two queen fossils which were fossilized as inclusions in transparent chunks of Baltic amber almost all of which are now presumed lost. Additional individuals of all castes have since been found in Baltic, Bitterfeld, Rovno, and Scandinavian amber.

Baltic amber is approximately forty six million years old, having been deposited during Lutetian stage of the Middle Eocene. There is debate on by what plant family the amber was produced, with macrofossil and microfossil evidence suggesting a Pinus relative, while chemical and spectroscopic evidence suggests Agathis or Sciadopitys. The paleoenvironment of the Eocene Baltic forests where the P. eocenicum lived was that of humid temperate to subtropical islands. The forests were composed of mostly Quercus and Pinus species, while the lower sections of the forests had paratropical plant elements, such as palms. Rovno amber, recovered from deposits in the Rivne region of Ukraine, is slightly younger in age, being dated to the Bartonian to Priabonian of the Late Eocene. Bitterfeld amber is recovered from coal deposits in the Saxony area of Germany and the dating of the deposits is uncertain. Bitterfeld represents a section of the Eocene Paratethys Sea, and the amber that is recovered from the region is thought to be redeposited from older sediments. The fossil record of Bitterfeld and Baltic amber insects is very similar with a number of shared species, and that similarity is noted in the suggestions of a single source for the paleoforest that produced the amber. The amber deposits on the Danish coast, often referred to as Scandinavian amber, is of similar age to the other three European ambers, however a study of the ant fauna published in 2009 indicates Scandinavian amber has a fairly distinct ant assemblage.

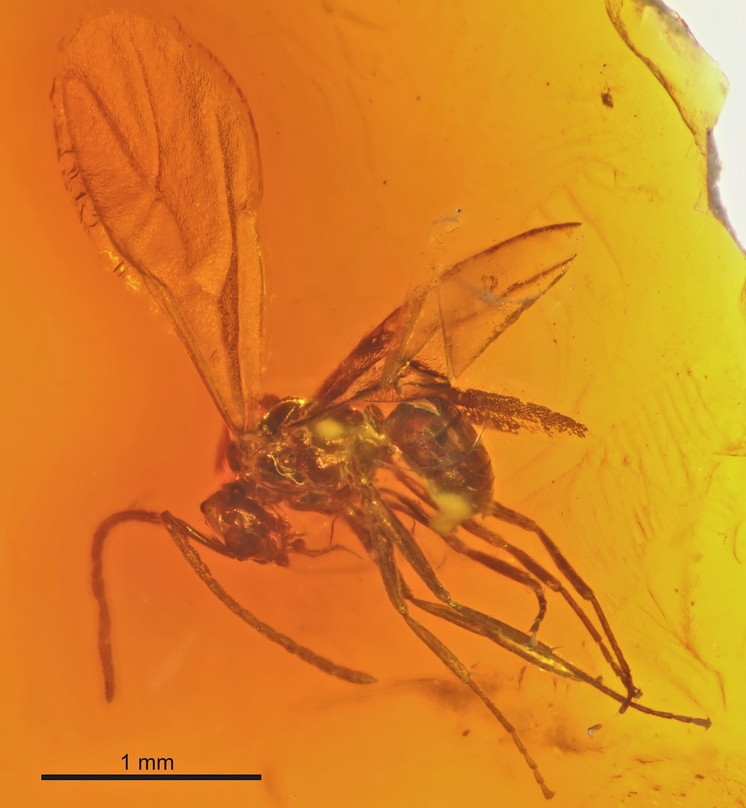
N. pygmaea queen

The species was first described in 1868 by Austrian entomologist Gustav Mayr based on twenty males and two queens. He named the species and placed it into the genus Prenolepis as Prenolepis pygmaea. The species was briefly re-examined in 1915 by William Morton Wheeler based on a group of 57 males and 3 queens, including 10 of Mayr's original male syntypes and 1 gyne syntype. Mayr's placement was unchanged until 2009 when the species was moved by Gennady Dlussky and Alexandr Rasnitsyn. Dlussky and Rasnitsyn noted that when the species was described by both Mayr and Wheeler Prenolepis and Paratrechina were considered a single genus, which was later separated by Carlo Emery in 1925, leaving the fossil species in Prenolepis. Based on the character states observed by Dlussky and Rasnitsyn they moved the species to Paratrechina. Fossil species belonging to the Prenolepis genus group were again examined and reviewed in 2010 by John LaPolla and Gennady Dlussky. Based on the mandible, pronotal structure and mesonotal setae they moved the species to Nylanderia, noting the species to be the oldest in the genus.

== Paleoecology ==
N. pygmaea is known primarily by winged males and females, a situation also seen in several Ponerinae species in Baltic, Bitterfeld, and Scandinavian ambers. Modern Nylanderia and the ponerinae species from Gnamptogenys, Hypoponera, Pachycondyla, Ponera, and Proceratium are all ground dwelling and nesting species, whose workers rarely climb high into trees. Due to this, the workers of the amber forest species would not often come into contact with fresh resin to be entombed. However, in all of the genera, the winged queens and males would climb plants and trees surrounding the nests during the nuptial flight increasing greatly the contact with fresh resin and entrapment.

An investigation of Baltic, Bitterfeld, Scandinavian, and Rovno ambers in 2009 showed over 90% of N. pygmaea specimens in Baltic, Scandinavian and Bitterfeld ambers were alates, while still being a very small component of the ant faunas. In Baltic amber N. pygmaea was between 0.51% and 0.71% of all ants, and in Bitterfeld the species was only 1.26%. In contrast Rovno amber showed a larger percentage at 3.03% and Scandinavian had the highest percentage 3.66%, which was suggested to relate possibly to habitat humidity.

== Description ==
Workers are between 1.5–1.6 mm (0.059–0.063 in) long with a shiny brown exoskeleton. There are setae along the rear edge of the head, two pairs of upright setae on the pronotum, another pair on the mesonotum and the gaster has scattered upright setae. The heads are rectangular in outline, being slightly narrower than long, and have a faintly concave to straight rear margin. The first segment of the antennae, the scape, extends past the rear edge of the head. They have a compact mesosoma that has a distinct metanotal sclerite and a gently curved propodeum.

Males are a little larger than the workers, with a length between 1.5–1.7 mm (0.059–0.067 in) reported by Wheeler in 1915 and between 1.7–1.9 mm (0.067–0.075 in) reported by LaPolla in 2010.
