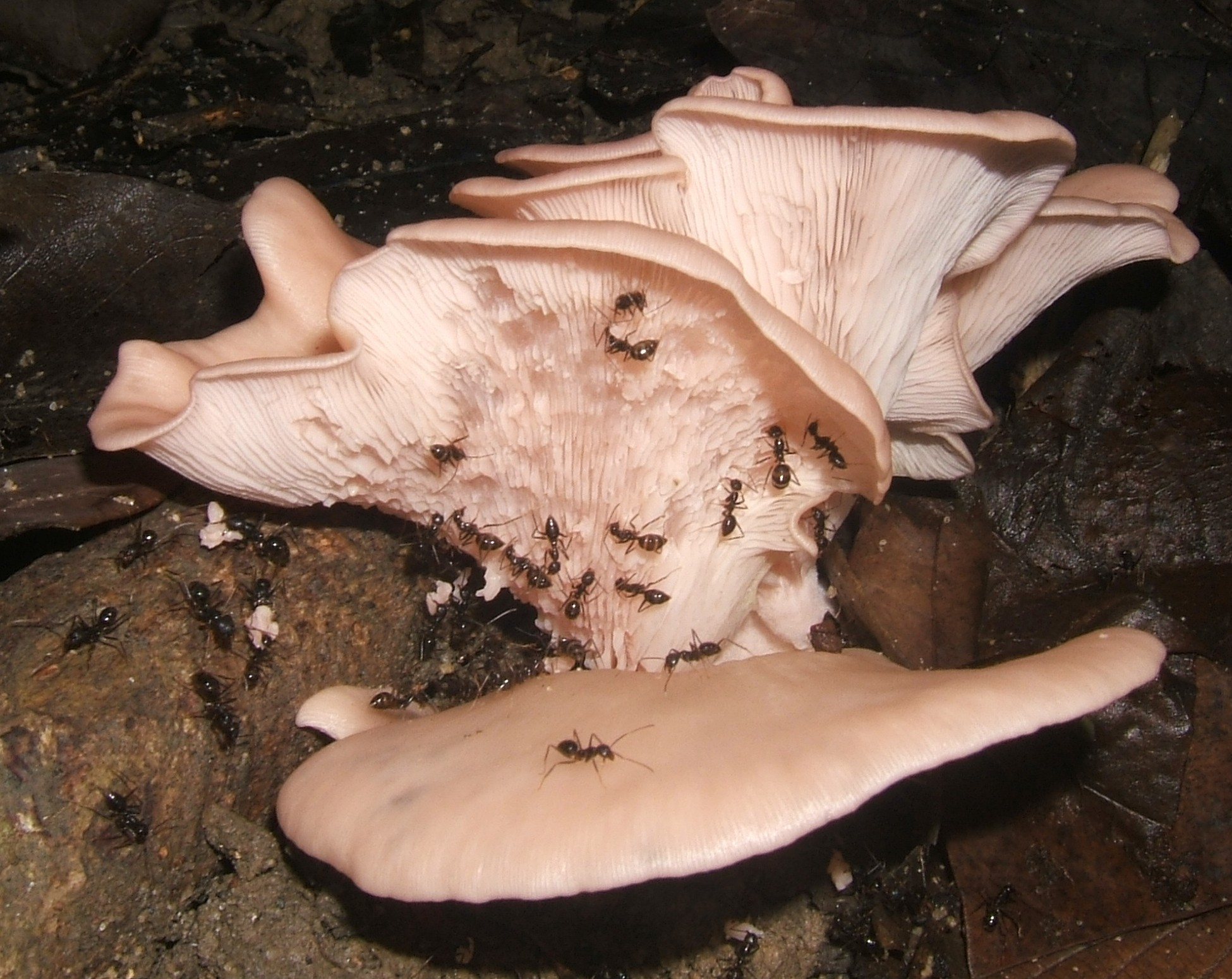
- Workers of E. procera feeding on a Pleurotus mushroom

Scientific classification
- Kingdom: Animalia
- Phylum: Arthropoda
- Class: Insecta
- Order: Hymenoptera
- Family: Formicidae
- Subfamily: Formicinae
- Tribe: Lasiini
- Genus: Euprenolepis; Emery, 1906

Type species
- Prenolepis procera Emery, 1900

Diversity
- 8 species

Synonyms
- Chapmanella Wheeler, 1930

= Euprenolepis =

Genus of ants

Euprenolepis is a Southeast Asian genus of ants in the subfamily Formicinae with eight recognized species.

== Species ==
- Euprenolepis echinata LaPolla, 2009
- Euprenolepis maschwitzi LaPolla, 2009
- Euprenolepis negrosensis (Wheeler, 1930)
- Euprenolepis procera (Emery, 1900)
- Euprenolepis thrix LaPolla, 2009
- Euprenolepis variegata LaPolla, 2009
- Euprenolepis wittei LaPolla, 2009
- Euprenolepis zeta La Polla, 2009

== Distribution ==
Euprenolepis is endemic to southeastern Asia. Most species are presently known from Borneo only, but whether or not this reflects biological reality or collecting bias remains unclear.

== Taxonomy ==
Euprenolepis was constructed as a subgenus within Prenolepis by Emery (1906), but he later moved the subgenus to Paratrechina (Emery, 1925). When Euprenolepis was raised to full genus level by Brown (1953), he also synonymized Chapmanella with Euprenolepis.

== Description ==
Six diagnostic characters can generally separate Euprenolepis workers from the workers of other formicine genera:

1. basal tooth with a distinct obtuse angle on the inner mandibular margin
2. apical tooth large and curved toward midline of body
3. mandalus is large and conspicuous
4. medially placed clypeus without a prominent keel
5. anterior clypeal margin medially emarginate, with a medially placed seta
6. widely spaced torulae

The reduced segmentation in the palps also helps in diagnosing the genus, except Pseudolasius also exhibits palpal segment reduction. With the exception of E. negrosensis, all species appear to have a 3:4 palpal formula. Pseudolasius typically possess two or three labial palpal segments. Euprenolepis is most likely to be confused with Pseudolasius, but with the exception of E. negrosensis, Euprenolepis species have much larger eyes than Pseudolasius species. Additionally, the six characters listed above provide a means to separate the two genera.

E. negrosensis placement within the genus remains somewhat problematic. The species was originally placed in its own genus, Chapmanella, by Wheeler (1930), but overall its general morphology suggests placement in Euprenolepis. However, it is distinctly unlike other species, in that it possesses very small eyes, extreme elongation of the mesosoma, a quadriform basal tooth (although rarely some specimens observed have a basal tooth as in other Euprenolepis species), and a 4:4 palpal formula. This species is at present maintained in Euprenolepis, but this result should be confirmed with molecular data once specimens become available for molecular study.

Morphological characters of E. negrosensis males do suggest placement within the genus for several shared characters exist among the three species where males are known. Among those are:

1. digiti weakly anvil-shaped, ventrally directed
2. digiti and cuspi meeting dorsally, about halfway along length of digiti
3. apices of parameres bending towards the midline of the body

These three characters may represent diagnostic features for the genus. Another distinctive feature of all known Euprenolepis males is their hirsuteness, especially on the parameres and terminal gastral segments. The parameres can be difficult to see because of the presence of abundant, long setae. E. negrosensis apparently is a hypogaeic species based on its small eyes and yellow, thin cuticle, and this may explain the unusual appearance of the workers compared to other species within the genus. It remains unclear how widespread polymorphism is in the genus. Polymorphism is exhibited in E. procera, with a minor and major worker caste clearly expressed. However, in no other known species is polymorphism observed. This may reflect collecting bias, because most species are only known from a few localities. However, at least one species, E. wittei, has been collected from long nest series and polymorphism has not been found in the workers. Despite E. procera being by far the most commonly encountered Euprenolepis in collections, majors are still relatively uncommon.
