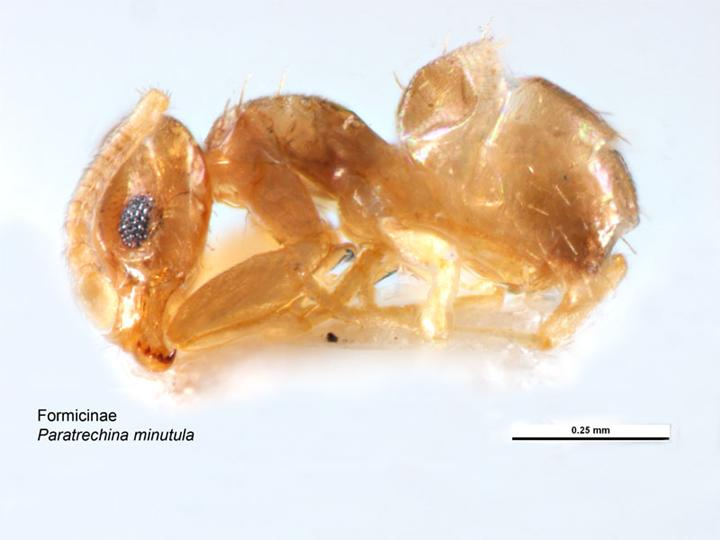
- Paraparatrechina minutula

Scientific classification
- Domain: Eukaryota
- Kingdom: Animalia
- Phylum: Arthropoda
- Class: Insecta
- Order: Hymenoptera
- Family: Formicidae
- Subfamily: Formicinae
- Tribe: Lasiini
- Genus: Paraparatrechina; Donisthorpe, 1947

Type species
- Paratrechina pallida Donisthorpe, 1947

Species
- See text

= Paraparatrechina =

Genus of ants

Paraparatrechina is a genus of small ants in the subfamily Formicinae. The genus contains 39 species distributed in the tropics of Africa, Asia and Australia.

== Distribution and habitat ==
The genus is restricted to the Paleotropics. Thirteen species are known from the Afrotropical and Malagasy regions, and twenty-five species and subspecies from Asia and Australia, although preliminary study suggests that there are many undescribed species. Very little is known about the biology of Paraparatrechina in the Afrotropical and Malagasy regions. They have been found in a wide range of tropical habitats from rainforests to forest clearings in sifted leaf litter, rotten logs, under stones, and from beating vegetation and fogging samples from the forest canopy.

== Taxonomy ==
Paraparatrechina was first described as a subgenus of Paratrechina by Donisthorpe (1947). LaPolla et al. (2010a) elevated the formerly synonymized subgenus to genus rank based on both morphological and molecular data.

== Description ==
Paraparatrechina are small (typically around 1–2 mm (0.039–0.079 in) in total length) formicine ants, which often reflect a metallic iridescence (blue, purple and pink hues have been observed) under light microscopy. In darker species, the iridescence tends to be a darker bluish-purple, while lighter colored species either show little iridescence or reflect a more pinkish-purple hue. Paraparatrechina are usually easily distinguishable from other formicine genera by a unique mesosomal setal pattern: two pairs of erect setae on the pronotum, one pair on the mesonotum and one pair on the propodeum. Nylanderia, the genus most likely confused with Paraparatrechina, never possesses a pair of erect setae on the propodeum. The mandibles of Paraparatrechina also possess five teeth, while in Nylanderia six teeth are usually present.

== Species ==
- Paraparatrechina albipes (Emery, 1899)
- Paraparatrechina brunnella LaPolla, Cheng & Fisher, 2010
- Paraparatrechina bufona (Wheeler, 1922)
- Paraparatrechina butteli (Forel, 1913)
- Paraparatrechina caledonica (Forel, 1902)
- Paraparatrechina concinnata LaPolla, Cheng & Fisher, 2010
- Paraparatrechina dichroa (Karavaiev, 1933)
- Paraparatrechina emarginata (Forel, 1913)
- Paraparatrechina foreli (Emery, 1914)
- Paraparatrechina glabra (Forel, 1891)
- Paraparatrechina gnoma LaPolla, Cheng & Fisher, 2010
- Paraparatrechina iridescens (Donisthorpe, 1942)
- Paraparatrechina kongming (Terayama, 2009)
- Paraparatrechina koningsbergeri (Karavaiev, 1933)
- Paraparatrechina lecamopteridis (Donisthorpe, 1941)
- Paraparatrechina minutula (Forel, 1901)
- Paraparatrechina myops LaPolla, Cheng & Fisher, 2010
- Paraparatrechina nana (Santschi, 1928)
- Paraparatrechina neela Sahanashree, Punnath & Rajan Priyadarsanan, 2024
- Paraparatrechina nettae (Forel, 1911)
- Paraparatrechina oceanica (Mann, 1921)
- Paraparatrechina ocellatula LaPolla, Cheng & Fisher, 2010
- Paraparatrechina opaca (Emery, 1887)
- Paraparatrechina oreias LaPolla, Cheng & Fisher, 2010
- Paraparatrechina pallida (Donisthorpe, 1947)
- Paraparatrechina pusillima (Emery, 1922)
- Paraparatrechina sauteri (Forel, 1913)
- Paraparatrechina splendida LaPolla, Cheng & Fisher, 2010
- Paraparatrechina subtilis (Santschi, 1920)
- Paraparatrechina tapinomoides (Forel, 1905)
- Paraparatrechina umbranatis LaPolla, Cheng & Fisher, 2010
- Paraparatrechina weissi (Santschi, 1910)
