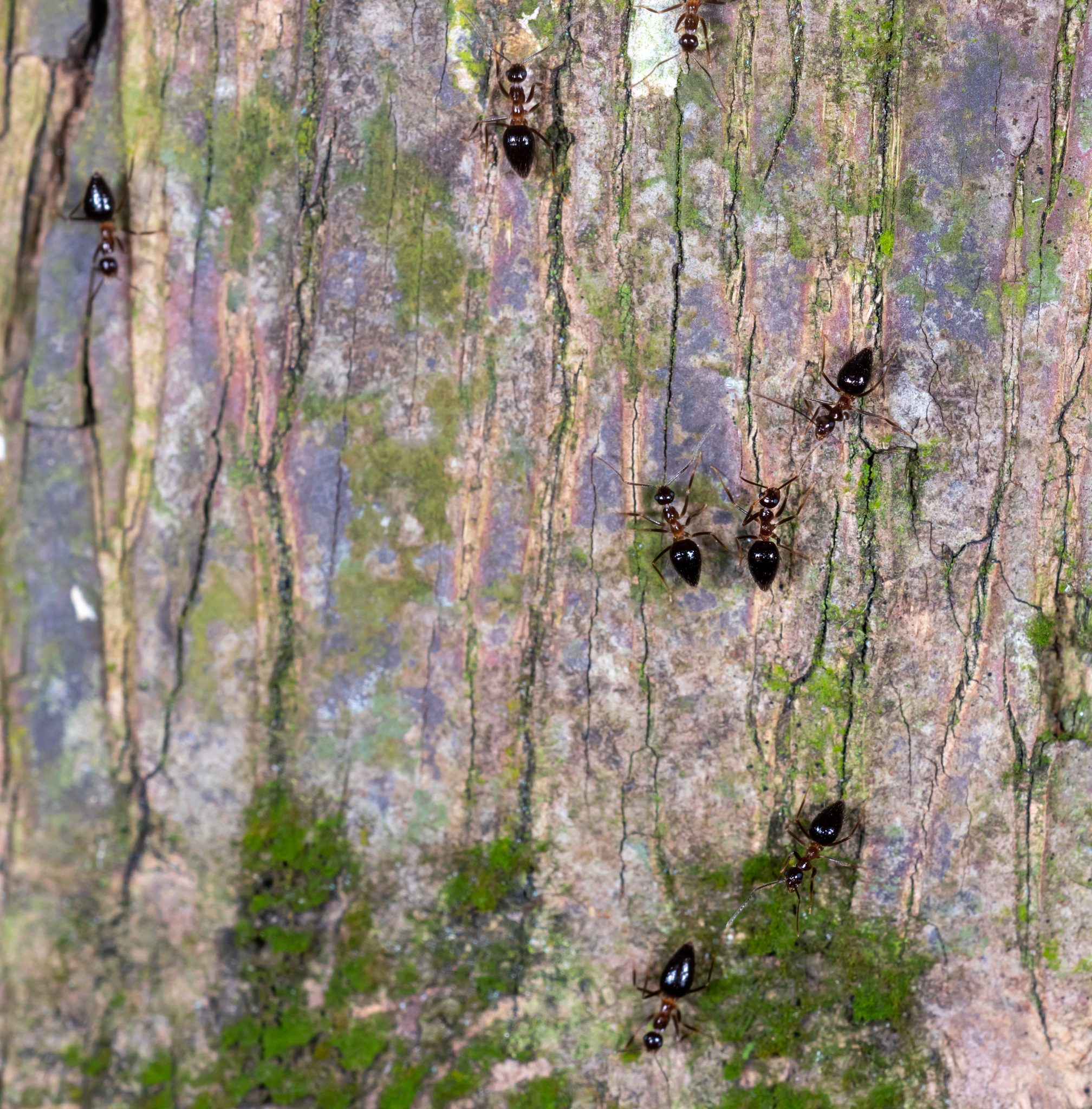
- P. naoroji from Kuala Lumpur, Malaysia

Scientific classification
- Kingdom: Animalia
- Phylum: Arthropoda
- Clade: Pancrustacea
- Class: Insecta
- Order: Hymenoptera
- Family: Formicidae
- Subfamily: Formicinae
- Genus: Prenolepis
- Species: P. naoroji

Binomial name
- Prenolepis naoroji Forel, 1902

= Prenolepis naoroji =

Species of ant

Prenolepis naoroji is a species of ant in the subfamily Formicinae. It is found in India, Nepal, Sri Lanka and China.
