= Euprenolepis negrosensis =

Scientific classification
- Domain: Eukaryota
- Kingdom: Animalia
- Phylum: Arthropoda
- Class: Insecta
- Order: Hymenoptera
- Family: Formicidae
- Subfamily: Formicinae
- Genus: Euprenolepis
- Species: E. negrosensis

Binomial name
- Euprenolepis negrosensis (Wheeler, 1930)

Species of ant

Euprenolepis negrosensis is an ant species that belongs to the genus Euprenolepis. Described by Wheeler in 1930, they are normally found in South East Asia.
