= Nylanderia vagabunda =

Scientific classification
- Kingdom: Animalia
- Phylum: Arthropoda
- Clade: Pancrustacea
- Class: Insecta
- Order: Hymenoptera
- Family: Formicidae
- Subfamily: Formicinae
- Genus: Nylanderia
- Species: N. vagabunda

Binomial name
- Nylanderia vagabunda (Motschoulsky, 1863)

Species of ant

Nylanderia vagabunda, is a species of Formicinae ant found in Sri Lanka.
