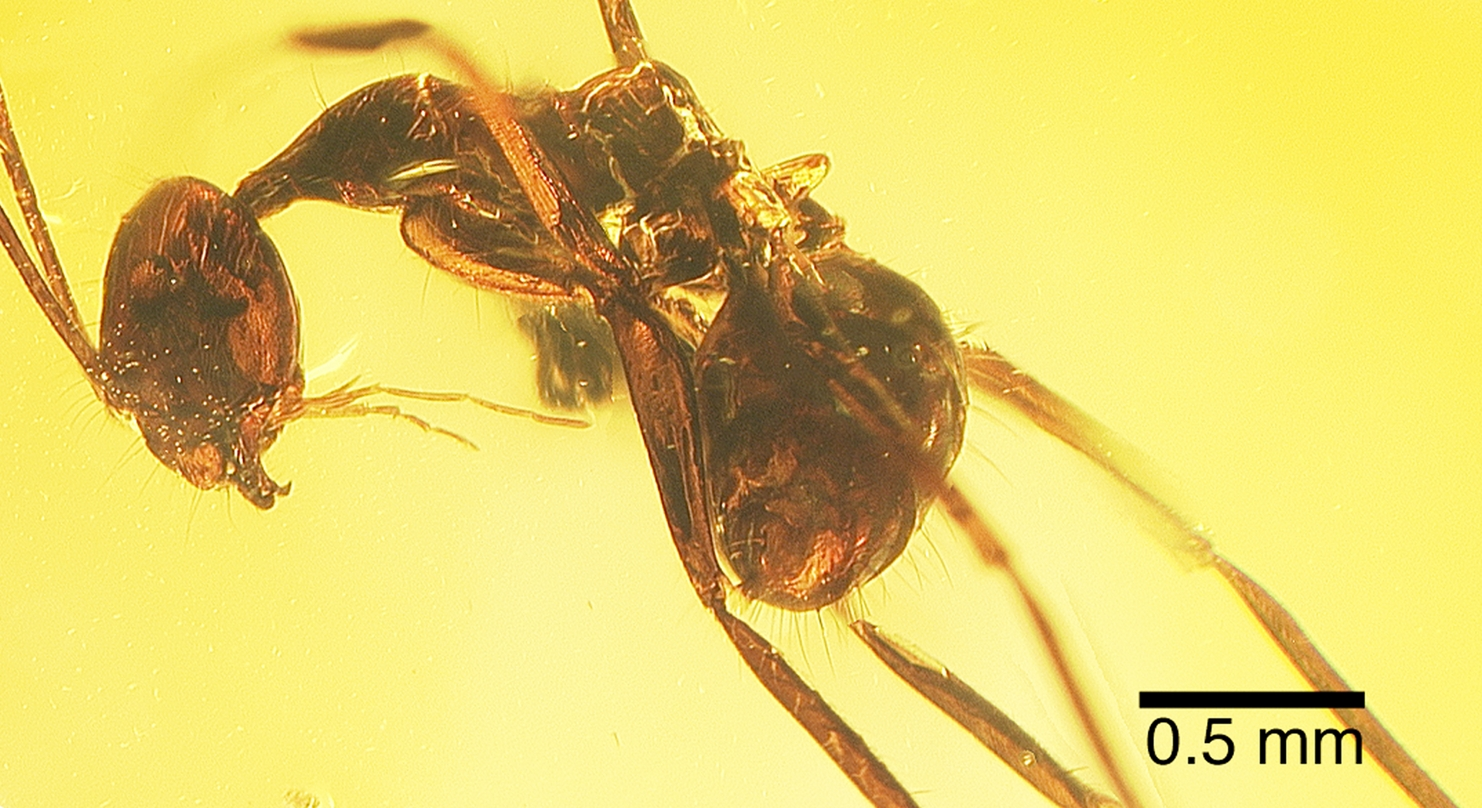
- Holotype

Scientific classification
- Domain: Eukaryota
- Kingdom: Animalia
- Phylum: Arthropoda
- Class: Insecta
- Order: Hymenoptera
- Family: Formicidae
- Subfamily: Formicinae
- Genus: Zatania
- Species: †Z. electra

Binomial name
- †Zatania electra LaPolla, Kallal & Brady, 2012

= Zatania electra =

Extinct species of ant

Zatania electra is an extinct species of ant in the subfamily Formicinae known from three possibly Miocene fossils found on Hispaniola. Z. electra is one of several Zatania species found in the Greater Antilles.

== History and classification ==
Zatania electra is known from a group of three fossil insects which are entombed in pieces of Dominican amber. The amber was produced by the extinct Hymenaea protera, which formerly grew on Hispaniola, across northern South America, and up to southern Mexico. The specimen was collected from an undetermined amber mine in fossil-bearing rocks of the Cordillera Septentrional mountains of northern Dominican Republic. The amber dates from the Burdigalian stage of the Miocene, based on studying the associated fossil foraminifera, and may be as old as the Middle Eocene, based on the associated fossil coccoliths. This age range is due to the host rock being secondary deposits for the amber, and the Miocene as the age range is only the youngest that it might be.

At the time of description, the holotype worker and paratype male were preserved in the American Museum of Natural History collections while the paratype worker was part of the Museum of Comparative Zoology collections. The trio of ant fossils were first studied by entomologists John Lapolla, Robert Kallal, and Seán Brady with their 2012 type description of the new species being published in the journal Systematic Entomology. The specific epithet electra is derived from the Greek word electra which means "amber", referencing the species preservation in amber.

== Description ==
The coloration of both the workers and the males are hard to determine, being either a uniform reddish or dark brown. There are upright standing setae on the gaster, notum, propodeum, head and scapes, but it is hard to determine if fine pubescence is present on the head or antennae. The head is an elongate oval in outline with the rear corners rounded and indistinct. The eyes are small and notably convex while the mandibles have five possible teeth. The basal segment of the antennae, the scape, is elongated, reaching back past the rear margin of the head.

The males have a slightly rectangular heads that are wider than long, and dominated on each side by convex large compound eyes. The mandibles have large apical teeth and possibly small denticles, similar to males of the living species Zatania gibberosa. As in the workers, the antennae have elongated scapes that extend beyond the rear margin of the head and have short setae on them. The genitalia are similar to the species Zatania cisipa and Zatania gloriosa, having narrow long parameres.
