= Paraparatrechina neela =

Scientific classification
- Kingdom: Animalia
- Phylum: Arthropoda
- Clade: Pancrustacea
- Class: Insecta
- Order: Hymenoptera
- Family: Formicidae
- Subfamily: Formicinae
- Genus: Paraparatrechina
- Species: P. neela

Binomial name
- Paraparatrechina neela Sahanashree, Punnath & Priyadarsanan, 2024

Species of ant

Paraparatrechina neela is a species of small ants in the subfamily Formicinae and the genus Paraparatrechina. Discovered in 2024, it is only known from India. It is a small ant, having a total body length of less than 2 mm (0.079 in). Its body is predominantly metallic blue in color, except for the antennae, mandibles, eyes, and legs. Consequently, it is known as the blue ant.

P. neela worker ant specimens were collected from a secondary forest at an elevation of 803 m (2,635 ft) in Yingku village, East Siang District of Arunachal Pradesh.

== Etymology ==
The specific epithet of the species, neela is a noun in apposition, signifying the color blue in most Indian languages. It is used to describe the unique blue or sapphire color of this species.

In India only one species of the genus Paraparatrechina is reported. The earlier species reported in India is P. aseta which was recorded in the year 1902.
