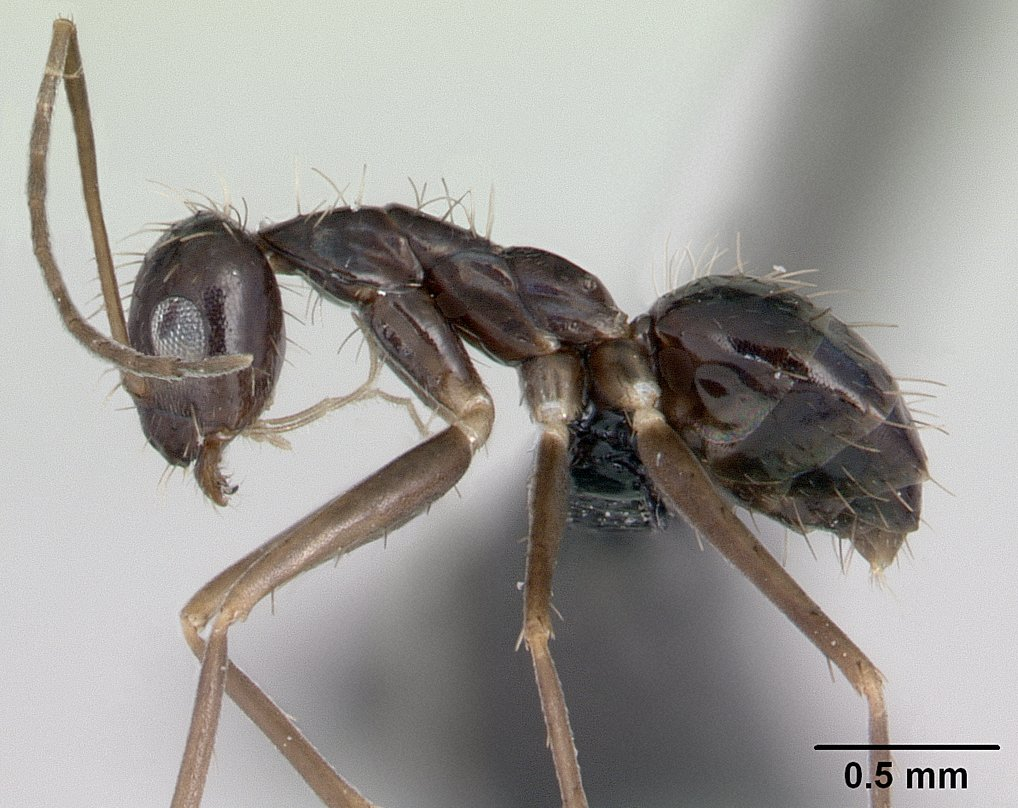
- Paratrechina longicornis (longhorn crazy ant) worker

Scientific classification
- Kingdom: Animalia
- Phylum: Arthropoda
- Clade: Pancrustacea
- Class: Insecta
- Order: Hymenoptera
- Family: Formicidae
- Subfamily: Formicinae
- Tribe: Lasiini
- Genus: Paratrechina; Motschulsky, 1863

Type species
- Paratrechina currens Motschoulsky, 1863

Diversity
- 6 species

= Paratrechina =

Genus of ants

Paratrechina is one of seven ant genera (alongside Euprenolepis, Nylanderia, Paraparatrechina, Prenolepis, Pseudolasius, and Zatania) in the Prenolepis genus-group from the subfamily Formicinae (tribe Lasiini). Six species are included in Paratrechina; one of which, the longhorn crazy ant (Paratrechina longicornis), is a widespread, pantropical pest.

== Distribution ==
Most Paratrechina species are native to sub-Saharan Africa and Madagascar, but one species, Paratrechina umbra, has only been found in southern China and is native to Southeast Asia. The only species found outside of these regions is Paratrechina longicornis, which has been introduced by humans to tropical areas across the globe. The native range of Paratrechina longicornis is currently unknown, but it is thought to be of either African or Asian origin. Although Paratrechina longicornis has been found in undisturbed habitats in Southeast Asia, the Afrotropics are the center of Paratrechina diversity. Paratrechina zanjensis, the purported sister species to Paratrechina longicornis, is found specifically in miombo woodlands across central and eastern Africa (including Angola, Zambia, Tanzania, and Mozambique), and Paratrechina longicornis is also considered a woodland specialist.

== Taxonomy ==
In 2010, the genus Paratrechina was discovered to be paraphyletic with respect to the subgenus Nylanderia, which was then elevated to full generic status. This taxonomic change resulted in Paratrechina becoming monotypic with Paratrechina longicornis as its sole species. A taxonomic review of Paratrechina in 2013 resulted in the description of another species from Africa, called Paratrechina zanjensis, and in 2014 the central African species Paratrechina kohli was transferred from Prenolepis and two more new species from Madagascar were described: Paratrechina ankarana and Paratrechina antsingy. The last taxonomic change to the genus was in 2016 when the Southeast Asian species Paratrechina umbra was transferred from Prenolepis, bringing Paratrechina to a total count of six species. This includes the ant commonly known as a "sugar ant", or "concrete ant". Not to be confused with pavement ants, as these are a separate species of ant.

== Morphology ==
=== Workers ===
Paratrechina species are most readily recognized by their gracile appearance due to their elongate scapes (first antennal segment), head, tibiae, and mesosoma. They also have erect macrosetae on the pronotum and mesonotum, but not the propodeum. The mesonotal and metanotal sutures of the mesosoma are always deep and complete, dividing those parts of the body into distinct segments. These sutures are useful for distinguishing Paratrechina from three other closely related genera: Paraparatrechina, Prenolepis, and Zatania. Euprenolepis, Nylanderia, and Pseudolasius also have these deep and complete sutures and together form a clade with Paratrechina. Paratrechina species are very similar in appearance to those of Nylanderia, but may be distinguished by the placement of the compound eyes on the head. Nylanderia always have eyes placed to the anterior of the midline of the head, while the eyes of Paratrechina species (except Paratrechina umbra, which also has anteriorly placed eyes) are placed slightly posterior to the midline. Nylanderia are also known to always have six teeth on the masticatory margin of the mandible, while most Paratrechina species have five; exceptions being Paratrechina kohli, which has eight, and Paratrechina umbra, which has six.

=== Reproductives ===
Paratrechina queens and males are known only from Paratrechina longicornis and have not been described for any other species within the genus. The males of Paratrechina longicornis are quite distinct from those of closely related genera. Compared to those of Prenolepis and Zatania, males of Paratrechina longicornis have much shorter, more robust parameres. The parameres also have a more dorsal orientation and curvature, making them especially unique among Prenolepis genus-group males.

== Reproductive biology ==
While most ant species exhibit arrhenotokous parthenogenesis in which diploid, fertilized eggs become females (workers or queens), and haploid, unfertilized eggs become males, Paratrechina longicornis is one of several ant species also known to be thelytokous, and queens can additionally produce female offspring asexually. As a result, sibling mating allows recombination of alleles without increasing deleterious homozygosity and bypasses the downsides of inbreeding because the genomes of the queens and males within a colony are not linked.

== Symbiosis ==
See also: Myrmecophily

=== Mutualism ===
Some species of Paratrechina have been reported to engage in mutualistic association with caterpillars of Eurybia elvina, a metalmark butterfly. The ants are attracted to the tentacle nectary organ of the caterpillars, which produces exudates rich in sugar and amino acids. The ants are thought to provide protection to the caterpillars against natural enemies in return for this source of nutrition. This observation was made in 1987, long before major taxonomic changes to the genus in 2010. The publication that describes this mutualistic behavior does not specify which Paratrechina species engaged in this behavior, and the only Paratrechina species currently known from Mexico, where this behavior was documented, is the exotic pest, the longhorn crazy ant (Paratrechina longicornis.). All other species in Mexico that were thought to be Paratrechina at the time of this publication (1987) are now classified as Nylanderia species. While it is possible that at least one of the species tending Eurybia elvina was Paratrechina longicornis, this is impossible to confirm from the original publication.

Twenty-seven genera of Actinomycetota have been found in association with Paratrechina longicornis colonies and the soils surrounding their nests. These microorganisms often provide benefits to insects by protecting them from pathogens.

=== Kleptoparasitism ===
Myrmecophilous, kleptoparasitic ant crickets of the species Myrmecophilus americanus are closely associated with Paratrechina longicornis nests from localities in tropics all around the world. Ant crickets live inside of ant nests and steal food resources, presumably through trophallaxis with worker ants. All known cases of ants in association with this ant cricket except one involve Paratrechina longicornis as the host ant species. The body of Myrmecophilus americanus is similar in overall size and shape to the gaster of Paratrechina longicornis queens, indicating that this may be a form of mimicry that reduces the chances that the cricket will be detected within the colony.

== In popular culture ==
The longhorn crazy ant (Paratrechina longicornis) made an appearance as one of the companion species to the eponymous superhero in the Marvel movie, Ant-Man (2015). Although the film refers to the species as Paratrechina longicornis, the CGI-rendered ants and their behaviors in the movie arguably hold more resemblance to the Rasberry/tawny crazy ant. (Nylanderia fulva).

== See also ==
- Rasberry/tawny crazy ant (Nylanderia fulva)
- Yellow crazy ant (Anoplolepis gracilipes)
