= Euprenolepis thrix =

Scientific classification
- Domain: Eukaryota
- Kingdom: Animalia
- Phylum: Arthropoda
- Class: Insecta
- Order: Hymenoptera
- Family: Formicidae
- Subfamily: Formicinae
- Genus: Euprenolepis
- Species: E. thrix

Binomial name
- Euprenolepis thrix LaPolla, J. S., 2009

Species of ant

Euprenolepis thrix is a Southeast Asian species of ant in the subfamily Formicinae.
