= Nylanderia taylori =

Scientific classification
- Kingdom: Animalia
- Phylum: Arthropoda
- Clade: Pancrustacea
- Class: Insecta
- Order: Hymenoptera
- Family: Formicidae
- Subfamily: Formicinae
- Genus: Nylanderia
- Species: N. taylori

Binomial name
- Nylanderia taylori (Forel, 1894)

Species of ant

Nylanderia taylori is a species of Formicinae ant found in Bangladesh, India and Sri Lanka.

== Subspecies ==
- Nylanderia taylori levis Forel, 1913 - Sri Lanka
- Nylanderia taylori taylori Forel, 1894 - India, Bangladesh
