= Pseudolasius isabellae =

Scientific classification
- Kingdom: Animalia
- Phylum: Arthropoda
- Clade: Pancrustacea
- Class: Insecta
- Order: Hymenoptera
- Family: Formicidae
- Subfamily: Formicinae
- Genus: Pseudolasius
- Species: P. isabellae

Binomial name
- Pseudolasius isabellae Forel, 1908

Species of ant

Pseudolasius isabellae is a species of ant in the subfamily Formicinae. It is found in Sri Lanka and Indonesia.

== Subspecies ==
- Pseudolasius isabellae isabellae Forel, 1908 - Sri Lanka
- Pseudolasius isabellae simaluranus Forel, 1915 - Indonesia
