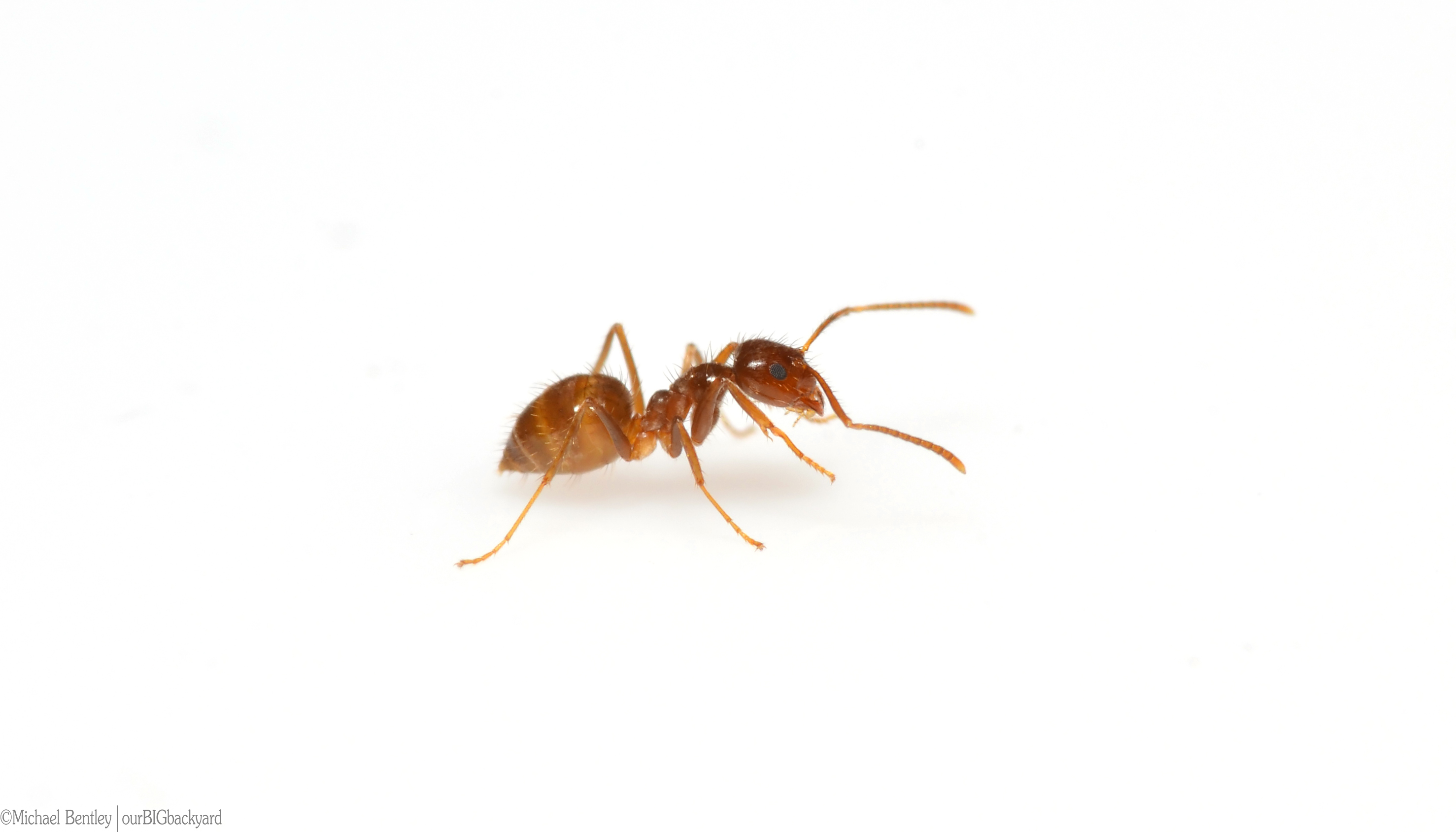

Scientific classification
- Kingdom: Animalia
- Phylum: Arthropoda
- Clade: Pancrustacea
- Class: Insecta
- Order: Hymenoptera
- Family: Formicidae
- Subfamily: Formicinae
- Genus: Nylanderia
- Species: N. fulva

Binomial name
- Nylanderia fulva Mayr 1862

Synonyms
- Prenolepis fulva

= Rasberry crazy ant =

Nylanderia fulva

Species of ant that is attracted to electrical equipment

The Rasberry crazy ant or tawny crazy ant (Nylanderia fulva) is an ant originating in South America. Like the longhorn crazy ant (Paratrechina longicornis), this species is called "crazy ant" because of its quick, unpredictable movements (the related N. pubens is known as the "Caribbean crazy ant"). It is sometimes called the "Rasberry crazy ant" in Texas after the exterminator Tom Rasberry, who noticed that the ants were increasing in numbers in 2002. Scientists have reorganised the genera taxonomy within this clade of ants, and now it is identified as Nylanderia fulva.

In 2014, it was discovered that the ant produces and covers itself with formic acid as an antidote to the fire ant's venom. It is the first known example of an insect being able to neutralize another insect's venom, an ability speculated to have evolved in South America where the two species share the same native range. Colonies have multiple queens, which also contributes to their survival.

As of 2012, the ants have established colonies in all states of the Gulf Coast of the United States including at least 27 counties in Southeast Texas.

== Description ==
The ant is about 3 mm (or about 1/8 inches) long, thus smaller than the red imported fire ant, Solenopsis invicta. It is covered with reddish-brown hairs. Their larvae are plump and hairy, with a specific conformation of mouthparts and unique mandible morphology that allows for precise species identification. The colonies live under stones or piles; they have no centralized nests, beds, or mounds. They tend aphids for honeydew, feed on small insects and vertebrates, and forage on plants, especially for sweet materials. The ants appear to prefer the warmth and moisture of the coast.

N. fulva has been a pest in rural and urban areas of Colombia, and South America, where it displaced all other ant species. There, small poultry such as chickens have died of asphyxiation while larger animals, such as cattle, have been attacked around the eyes, nostrils, and hooves. Grasslands have dried out because of the increase in plant-sucking insect pests (hemipterans), which the ants cultivate to feed on the sugary "honeydew" that they excrete.

When attacked, these ants, like other formicine ants, can bite (but not sting) and excrete formic acid through a hairy circle or acidopore on the end of the abdomen, using it as a venom, which causes a minute pain that quickly fades. Formic acid was named after the Latin word formica (ant), because it was first distilled from ants in the 17th century. Uniquely, the tawny ant also uses formic acid as an antidote against the venom alkaloids of the fire ant (known as solenopsins). The venom alkaloids of fire ants have been demonstrated to be strongly paralytic against competitor species, thus the tawny crazy ant may have developed a resistance by acid-immobilisation of the venom toxins.

Tawny crazy ants were found to displace other ant species in their native Argentina and later the US, including the red imported fire ant. This was first thought to be due to exploitative and interference competition.

=== Formic acid as an antidote to fire ant venom ===
In March 2014, researchers concluded that formic acid helped tawny crazy ants survive fire ant venom in ant fights 98% of the time; when the gland ducts were blocked with nail polish in an experiment, crazy ants had only a 48% chance of surviving fights with fire ants. After exposure to fire ant venom, N. fulva retreats, covers itself with formic acid and returns to the fight. This is the first known example of an insect detoxifying another insect's venom, and the first discovery of an ionic liquid in nature which results from mixing of formic acid with venom from S. invicta.

How formic acid acts as an antidote against the much more toxic fire ant's venom is unknown. Fire ant venom is a mixture of toxic alkaloids and proteins that presumably enable the alkaloids to enter rival ants' cells. Each alkaloid in the fire ant's venom, including solenopsin, has a six-membered heterocyclic ring with fat-soluble side chains. The researchers who discovered the antidote property of formic acid in crazy ants speculate that the formic acid denatures the proteins in fire ant venom. Another possibility is that the nitrogen on an alkaloid's heterocyclic ring is protonated, rendering the ionic molecule less lipophilic, thus less likely to penetrate the tawny crazy ant's cells.

== Diet ==
N. fulva eats liquids, including plant nectar and insect honeydew. Calcium, sodium, and potassium are very important to N. fulva: Higher environmental potassium decreased abundance, and higher potassium + sodium decreased abundance even more so. Meanwhile, higher calcium increased abundance.

== Effects on electrical equipment ==
It is unclear why colonies of Nylanderia fulva are attracted to electrical equipment. Infestations of Nylanderia fulva in electrical equipment can cause short circuits, sometimes because the ants chew through insulation and wiring. Overheating, corrosion, and mechanical failures also result from accumulations of dead ants and nest detritus in electrical devices. If an ant is electrocuted, it can release an alarm pheromone upon death, which causes other ants to rush over and search for attackers. If a large enough number of ants gather, it may short out systems.

Colonies of Nylanderia fulva are likely attracted to electrical equipment because the warm, confined space provides an attractive nesting place.

== Rate of spread ==
The Texas A&M University research extension service quotes the annual rate of spread by ground migration as about 240 and 360 m per year in neighborhoods and industrial areas, respectively, and 207 m/year in rural landscapes hence spreading more slowly than fire ants. Other sources quote 800 m (0.50 mi) per year. Being carried by people, animals, and vehicles (in trash for example), the observed rate is much higher: the spread from five Texas counties in 2002 to 20 in 2007 yields an accelerated rate of 8 km (5.0 mi) per year, at which rate it would take about 70 years for them to reach New Orleans. However, in 2011, tawny crazy ants were reported in Mississippi, in August 2012 in Port Allen, Louisiana, and in 2013 in Georgia.

== Range in the United States ==
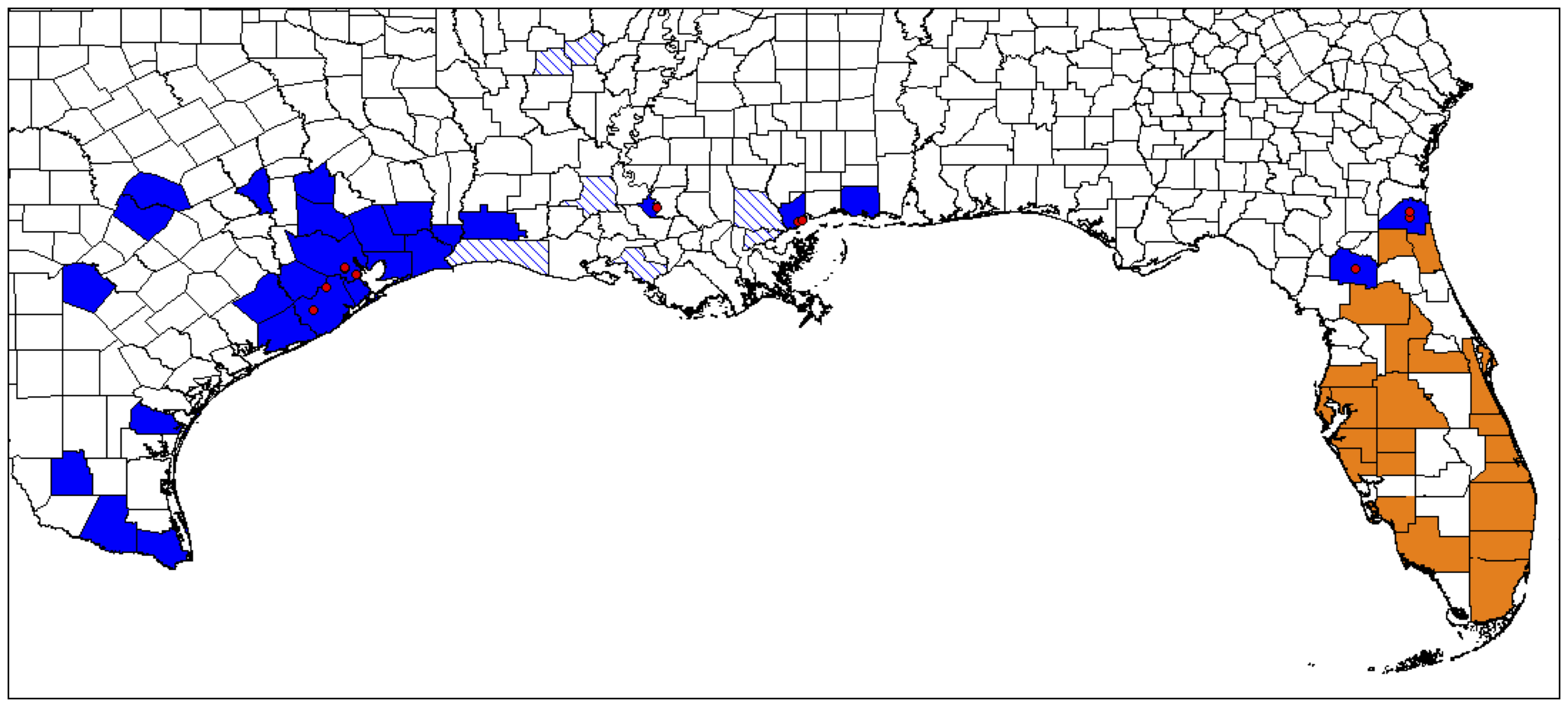
Reported distribution of the Rasberry crazy ant in the United States (2012); actual occurrence is thought to be more widespread

The earliest record of N. fulva presence in the US is from Brownsville, Texas, in 1938. By the early 2000s, the ants spread across the southeastern portion of Texas including more than 27 counties Large population explosions have been described also on St Croix in the US Virgin Islands; in many cases the ant species was misidentified as its close relative, the hairy crazy ant, Nylanderia pubens. As of 2012, the ants have established colonies in all states of the Gulf Coast of the United States. The ant is considered an invasive species. As of 2021 N. fulva establishment is limited to some southern parts of the country.

== Control in the US ==
The ants are not attracted to ordinary ant baits, and are not controlled by over-the-counter pesticides, and are harder to fully exterminate than many other species because their colonies have multiple queens. In June 2008, the United States Environmental Protection Agency granted temporary approval for the use of fipronil, an antitermite agent, to control this ant. Its use is currently restricted to infested counties.

In 2015, the microsporidian parasite Myrmecomorba nylanderiae was found to be a pathogen of the tawny crazy ant. In March 2022, further research indicated that this unicellular fungus may be an effective biological control for the tawny ant.
