= Nylanderia yerburyi =

Scientific classification
- Kingdom: Animalia
- Phylum: Arthropoda
- Clade: Pancrustacea
- Class: Insecta
- Order: Hymenoptera
- Family: Formicidae
- Subfamily: Formicinae
- Genus: Nylanderia
- Species: N. yerburyi

Binomial name
- Nylanderia yerburyi (Forel, 1894)

Species of ant

Nylanderia yerburyi, is a species of Formicinae ant found in India, Nicobar Islands, Sri Lanka, and China. It is named after the collector of the type specimen, John William Yerbury.
