= Tom Rasberry =

American entomologist

Tom Rasberry is an exterminator from Pearland, Texas, who first identified the Rasberry crazy ant in 2002. The ants have been known to short out many different types of electrical apparatus. Rasberry estimates that he has spent over 200 hours researching them.

== Pest control career ==
Rasberry started Budget Pest Control in 1989; the name was changed to Rasberry's Pest Professionals in late 2009.

== NASA career ==
The Johnson Space Center hired Rasberry in 2008 in an attempt to keep the ants out of their facilities. Rasberry found three colonies at the NASA site, but all were small enough to control.
