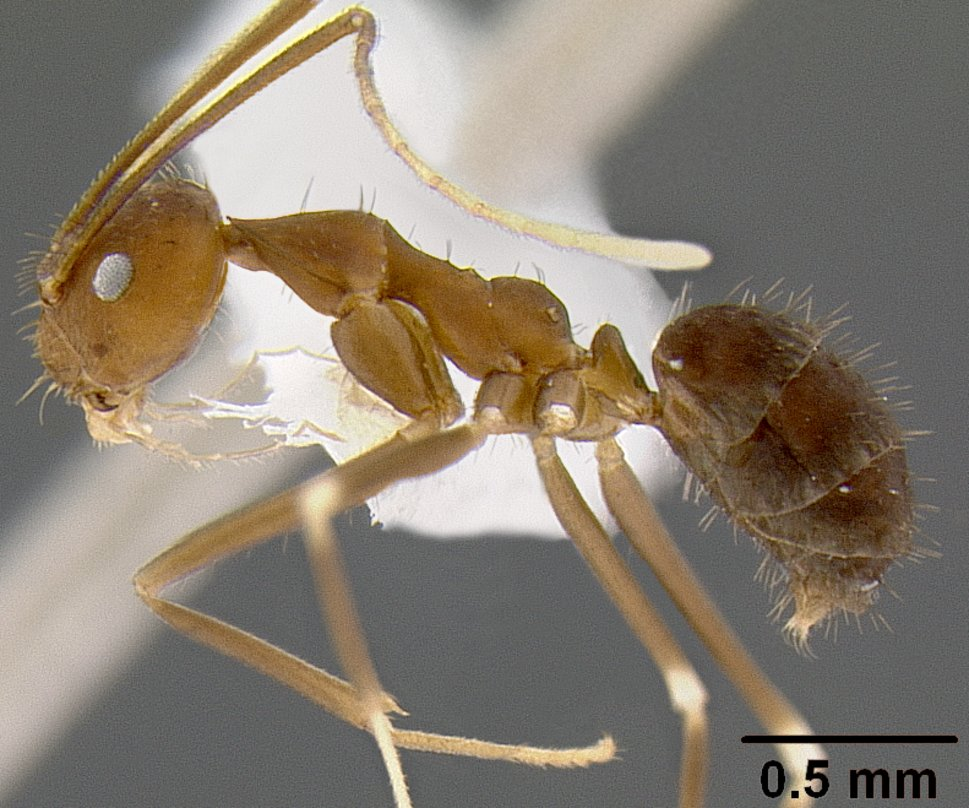
- Zatania albimaculata worker specimen

Scientific classification
- Kingdom: Animalia
- Phylum: Arthropoda
- Class: Insecta
- Order: Hymenoptera
- Family: Formicidae
- Subfamily: Formicinae
- Tribe: Lasiini
- Genus: Zatania; LaPolla, Kallal & Brady, 2012

Type species
- Paratrechina cisipa

Diversity
- 7 species

= Zatania =

Genus of ants

Zatania is a genus of ants in the subfamily Formicinae. The genus is known from Central America and the Greater Antilles.

The generic name is derived from Greek za, "very", tany, "long", referencing its elongated body features.

== Species ==
- Zatania albimaculata (Santschi, 1930)
- Zatania cisipa (Smith & Lavigne, 1973)
- Zatania darlingtoni (Wheeler, 1936)
- †Zatania electra LaPolla, Kallal & Brady, 2012
- Zatania gibberosa (Roger, 1863)
- Zatania gloriosa LaPolla, Kallal & Brady, 2012
- Zatania karstica (Fontenla, 2000)
