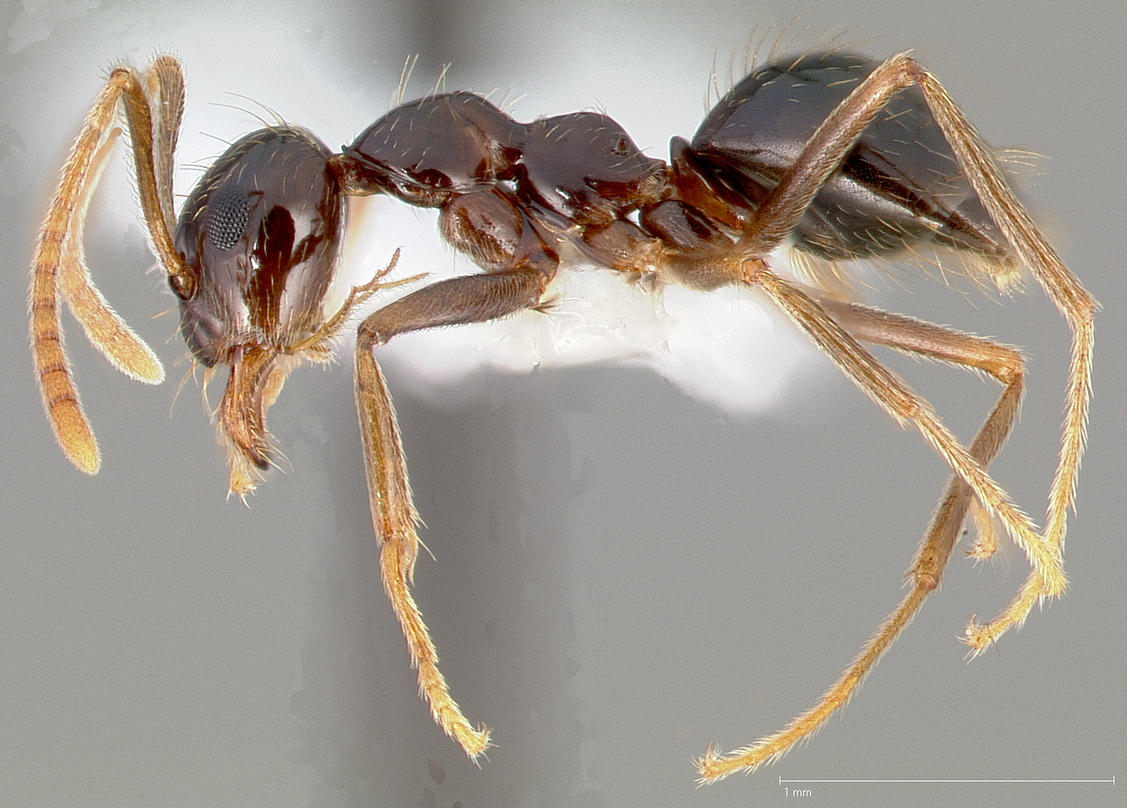
- Prenolepis imparis worker

Scientific classification
- Kingdom: Animalia
- Phylum: Arthropoda
- Clade: Pancrustacea
- Class: Insecta
- Order: Hymenoptera
- Family: Formicidae
- Subfamily: Formicinae
- Genus: Prenolepis
- Species: P. imparis

Binomial name
- Prenolepis imparis (Thomas Say, 1836)

= Prenolepis imparis =

Species of ant

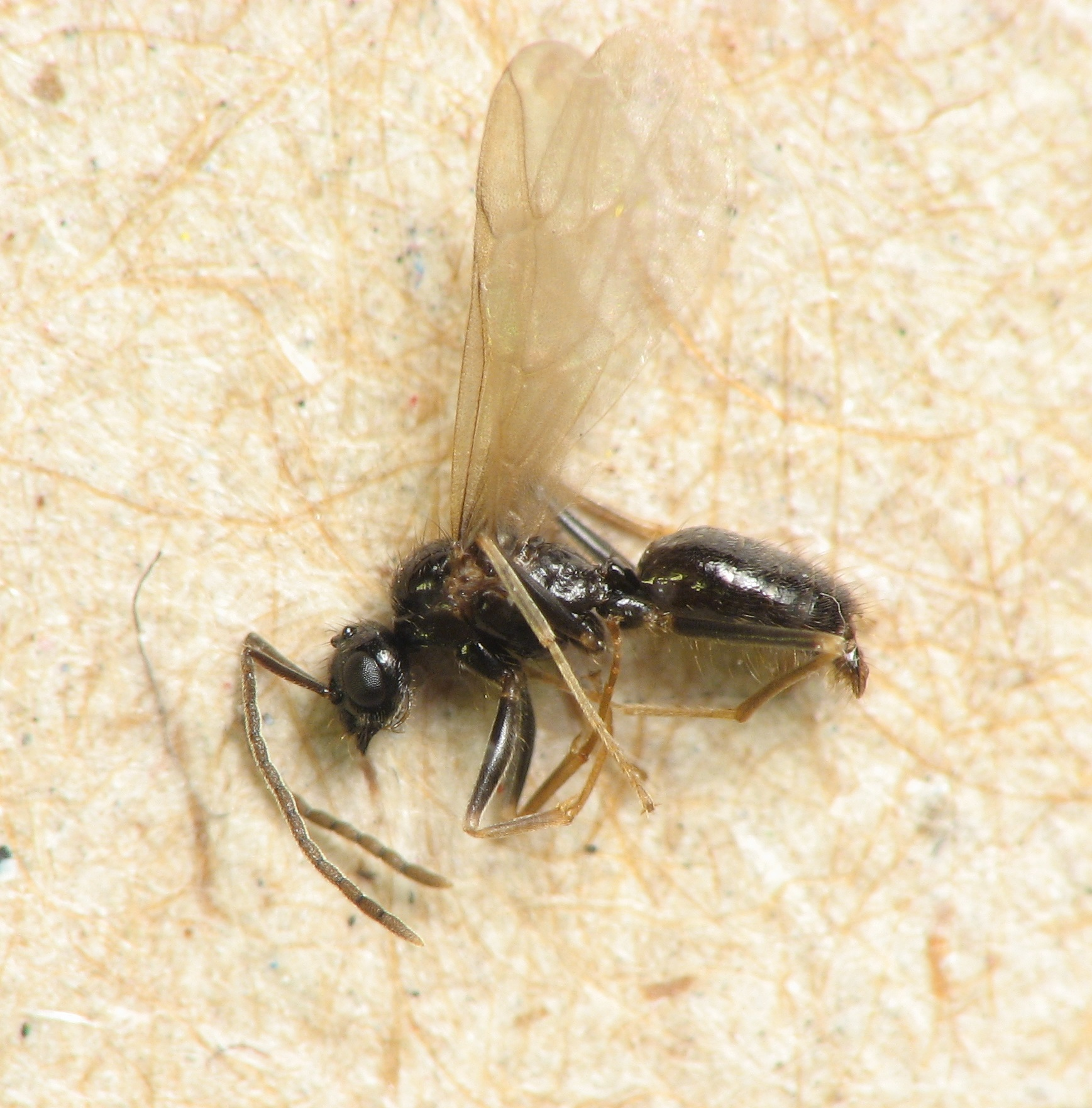
Prenolepis imparis, male

Prenolepis imparis, commonly known as the winter ant, false honey ant, or false honeypot ant, is a species of ant in the genus Prenolepis. The species is found in North America, from Canada to Mexico, nesting deep within the ground. Unusual among ants, Prenolepis imparis prefers lower temperatures, including near freezing, and is only active outside the nest during winter and early spring. Prenolepis imparis enters a hibernation-like state called aestivation during the summer.

P. imparis secretes an opaque white liquid from its abdomen as a defense against other ants, including Linepithema humile. The defensive secretions appear to be derived anatomically from the Dufour's gland and has been shown to contain a mixture of alkanes and alkenes including hexadecene, octadecene, tetradecene, octylcyclohexane, and hexadecane. Secretions from P. imparis have experimentally been shown to often kill L. humile workers.

The species acquired its nickname of "false honeypot ant" as a result of having replete-like workers, though they are not true repletes like those of Myrmecocystus and are referred to as corpulents.

== Subspecies ==
- Prenolepis imparis arizonica Wheeler., 1930
- Prenolepis imparis colimana Wheeler, 1930
- Prenolepis imparis coloradensis Wheeler, 1930
- Prenolepis imparis veracruzensis Wheeler, 1930
