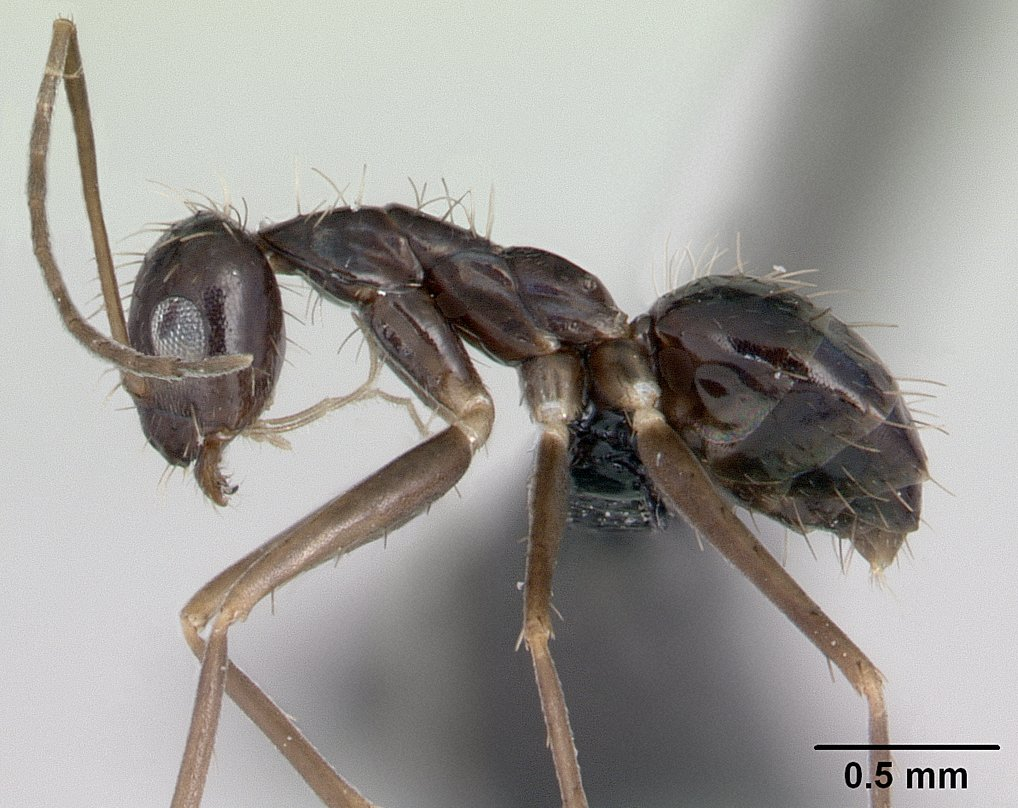
- Paratrechina longicornis worker

Scientific classification
- Kingdom: Animalia
- Phylum: Arthropoda
- Clade: Pancrustacea
- Class: Insecta
- Order: Hymenoptera
- Family: Formicidae
- Subfamily: Formicinae
- Genus: Paratrechina
- Species: P. longicornis

Binomial name
- Paratrechina longicornis (Latreille, 1802)

Synonyms
- Prenolepis longicornis Roger (1863); Prenolepis (Nylanderia) longicornis Emery (1910); Formica longicornis Latreille (1802); Formica vagans Jerdon (1851); Formica gracilescens Nylander (1856); Tapinoma gracilescens F. Smith (1858); Paratrechina currens Motschoulsky (1863); Paratrechina longicornis (Latreille) (1925)

= Longhorn crazy ant =

Paratrechina longicornis

Species of ant

The longhorn crazy ant (Paratrechina longicornis), also known as the black crazy ant, is a species of small Formicine ant. These ants are commonly called "crazy ants" because instead of following straight lines, they dash around erratically. They have a broad distribution, including much of the tropics and subtropics, and are also found in buildings in more temperate regions, making them one of the most widespread ant species in the world. This species, as well as all others in the ant subfamily Formicinae, cannot sting. However, this species can fire/shoot a formic acid spray from its abdomen when under attack by other insects or attacking other insects.

== Description ==
The worker longhorn crazy ant is about 2.3 to 3.0 mm (0.09 to 0.12 in) long with a brownish-black head, thorax, petiole, and gaster, often with a faint blue iridescence. The body has a few short, whitish bristles and the antennae and limbs are pale brown. Distinguishing this ant from other members of its genus, Paratrechina, is easy because its antennae and legs are so long. The first segment of each antenna is more than twice as long as the length between its base and the back edge of the head. The eyes are elliptical and set far back on the head. It has no sting, but the ant can bite and then curve its abdomen forwards and secrete formic acid onto its prey. A characteristic of this ant is the way that the workers move around erratically in seemingly random directions, whence their common name.

== Distribution and habitat ==
The genus Paratrechina probably originated in the tropics of Africa. It has spread to temperate regions around the world, and due to human interference, is now present in North and South America, Africa, Europe, Asia, and Oceania. It is a tropical species, but because of its ability to live in disturbed and artificial habitats, inside buildings, and in urban areas, it has been able to spread northwards to Estonia and Sweden and southwards to New Zealand. In the United States, it is present outdoors in much of the southeast of the country and also indoors in buildings and warehouses in California, Arizona, and the eastern seaboard. In tropical and subtropical areas, as well as being found in buildings, it is found in gardens, coastal scrub, lowland rainforest, dry forest, and savannah shrubland, and by the roadside at elevations of up to 1,765 m (5,791 ft), but at an average elevation of 175 m (574 ft). It is considered a pest, both agricultural and domestic, in most parts of the tropics and subtropics, and an indoor pest in temperate areas. It is said to be the most widespread species of ant in the world, although the pharaoh ant (Monomorium pharaonis) is another challenger for this position.

== Behaviour and ecology ==
Colonies of longhorn crazy ants make their nests in a wide range of either dry or damp sites. These include inside hollow trees, under loose bark, in rotten wood, under logs or stones, among rubbish, and under undisturbed debris inside buildings. They thrive in convenience stores, gas stations, apartment blocks, schools, and cafés. The workers emerge to forage and the location of the nest can be identified by watching ants carrying food back to the colony. The ants are omnivorous and feed on seeds, dead invertebrates, honeydew, plant secretions, fruit, and a range of household scraps. Large food items may be moved by several ants working together. They consume honeydew predominantly in spring and autumn, and may tend aphids, mealybugs, and scale insects so as to maximise the secretions they produce. During the summer, they preferentially seek a high-protein diet. In buildings, they collect crumbs and the insect corpses found under lights.

The longhorn crazy ant is able to invade new habitats and outcompete other species of ants. In 1991, in the large closed dome of the research station Biosphere 2 in the Arizona Desert, no particular ant species was dominant. By 1996, the longhorn crazy ant had virtually replaced all the other ant species. It fed almost exclusively on the honeydew secreted by the large numbers of scale insects and mealybugs present, and other invertebrates were greatly diminished. The ones that remained were either well armoured, such as millipedes and woodlice, or were tiny and lived underground, such as springtails and mites.

The inquiline wingless ant cricket (Myrmecophilus americanus) is often found living in the nest of the longhorn crazy ant and is kleptoparasitic on it, stealing food scraps brought back by the workers and encouraging them to regurgitate food. It may be assisted in this symbiosis by mimicry, as it resembles the gaster of the queen in both size and shape. Some poorly-known species of fungi have been found in association with crazy ants in South America.

== Life cycle ==
In tropical regions, male and female sexual forms may appear outside colonies at any time of year, but in Florida, they appear between May and September. On a warm damp evening, many males may emerge from the nest and mill about on the ground. Meanwhile, the workers congregate on nearby vegetation, and periodically, a wingless female comes out of the nest, although mating is difficult to observe in the constantly moving mass of ants. Although the males can fly, nuptial flights do not take place. On other occasions, massive numbers of workers sometimes emerge from colonies and carpet the ground. Large areas may be covered by a sheet of workers, many of them carrying brood, with many wingless females scattered among them. The reasons for these gatherings is unclear.

Longhorn crazy ants are able to mate with their siblings without showing any of the normal negative effects of inbreeding. Although the queen produces workers through normal sexual means, her daughter queens are her genetic clones and her sons are the genetic clones of her mate. The male and female gene pools thus remain completely separate (assuming workers never reproduce), and this has allowed the longhorn crazy ant to become one of the most widespread invasive species in the tropics. The process, known as double cloning, was discovered by evolutionary biologist Morgan Pearcy of the Université libre de Bruxelles.

The species apparently undergoes three larval moults, and their larvae are hairy and present unique morphology; male larvae can be easily distinguished from larvae destined to become workers because of longer and more abundant pilosity.
