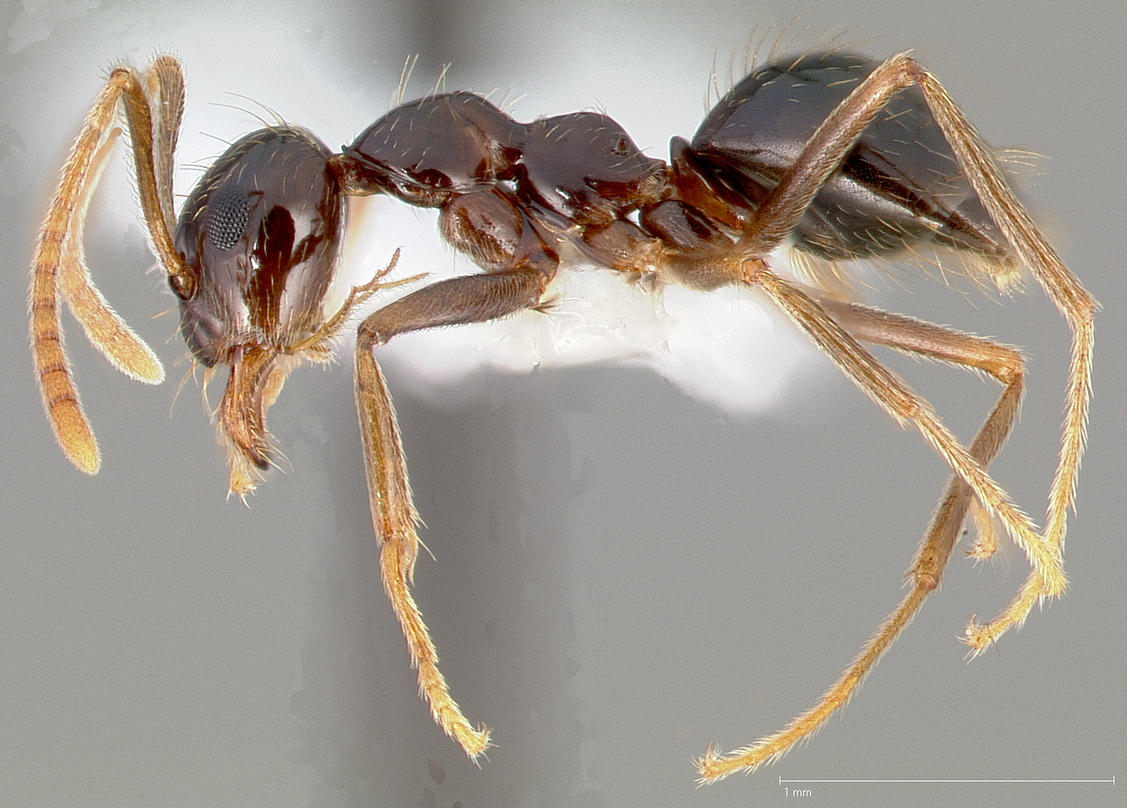
- Prenolepis imparis worker

Scientific classification
- Domain: Eukaryota
- Kingdom: Animalia
- Phylum: Arthropoda
- Class: Insecta
- Order: Hymenoptera
- Family: Formicidae
- Subfamily: Formicinae
- Tribe: Lasiini
- Genus: Prenolepis; Mayr, 1861

Type species
- Tapinoma nitens (Mayr, 1853)

Diversity
- 20 species

= Prenolepis =

Genus of ants

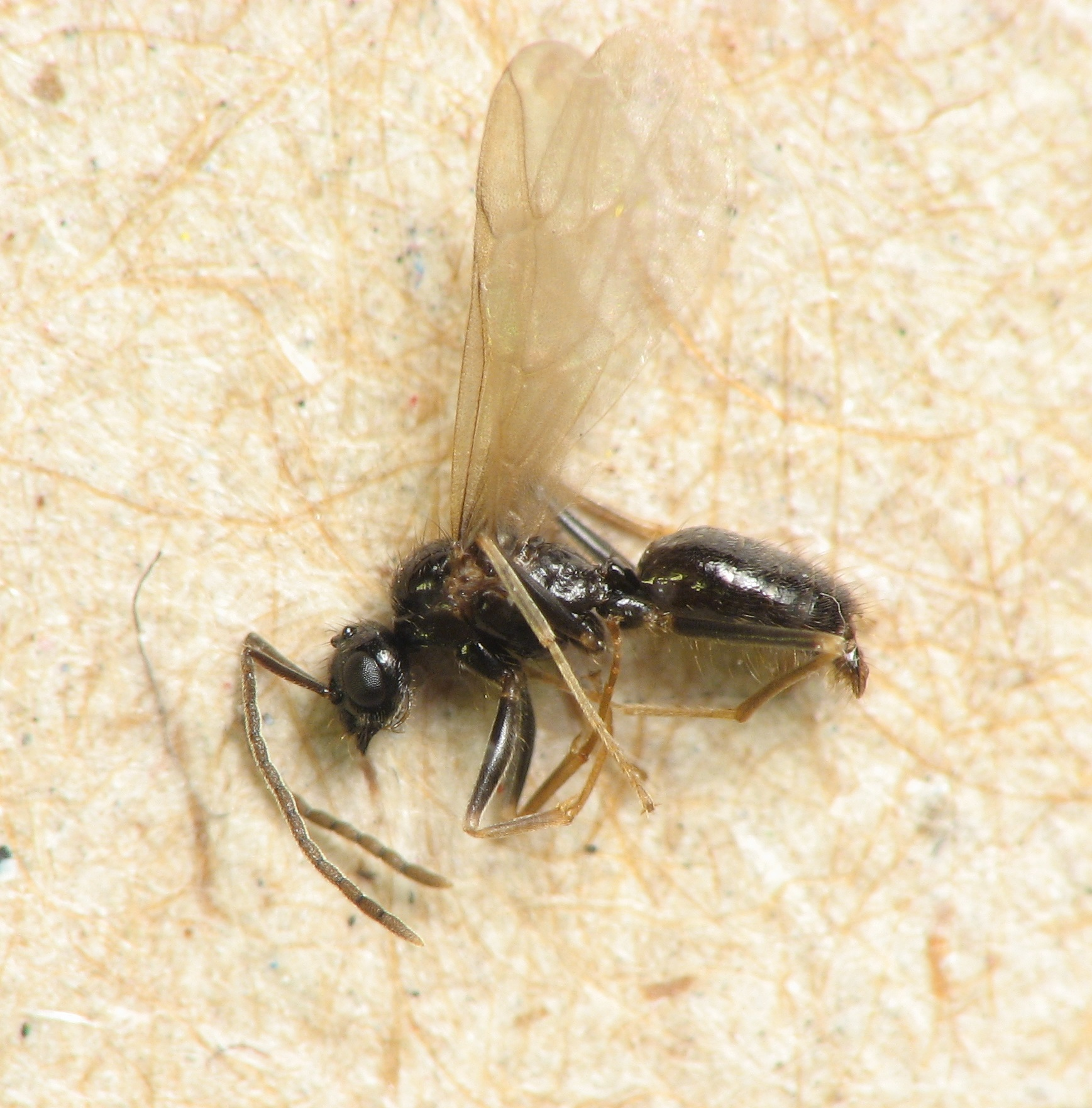
Prenolepis imparis, male

Prenolepis is a genus of ants in the subfamily Formicinae. Most species are found in southeastern Asia and southern China, but the genus has a wide distribution with species known from North America, southern Europe, Anatolia, Cuba, Haiti, and West Africa.

== Species ==
- Prenolepis angularis Zhou, 2001
- Prenolepis cyclopia Chen & Zhou, 2018
- Prenolepis darlena Williams & LaPolla, 2016
- Prenolepis dugasi Forel, 1911
- Prenolepis fisheri Bharti & Wachkoo, 2012
- Prenolepis fustinoda Williams & LaPolla, 2016
- †Prenolepis henschei Mayr, 1868
- Prenolepis imparis (Say, 1836)
- Prenolepis jacobsoni Crawley, 1923
- Prenolepis jerdoni Emery, 1893
- Prenolepis lakekamu Williams & LaPolla, 2018
- Prenolepis mediops Williams & LaPolla, 2016
- Prenolepis melanogaster Emery, 1893
- Prenolepis naoroji Forel, 1902
- Prenolepis nepalensis Williams & LaPolla, 2018
- Prenolepis nitens (Mayr, 1853)
- Prenolepis quinquedenta Chen & Zhou, 2018
- Prenolepis shanialena Williams & LaPolla, 2016
- Prenolepis striata Chen & Zhou, 2018
- Prenolepis subopaca Emery, 1900
