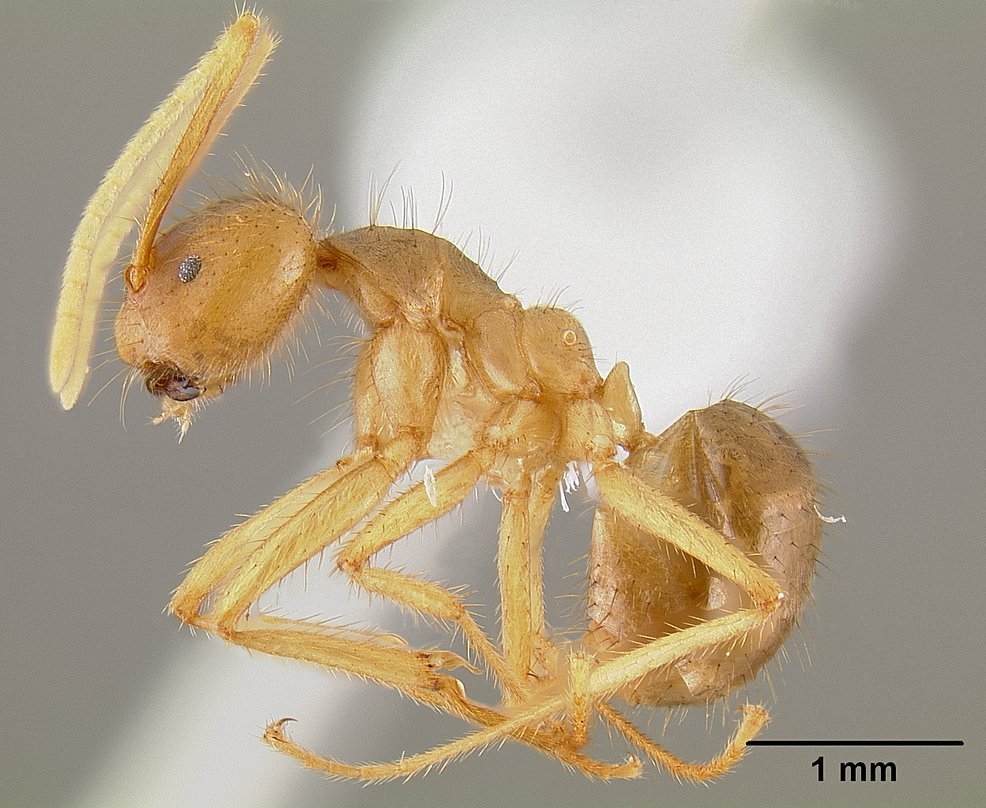
- Pseudolasius australis worker

Scientific classification
- Kingdom: Animalia
- Phylum: Arthropoda
- Clade: Pancrustacea
- Class: Insecta
- Order: Hymenoptera
- Family: Formicidae
- Subfamily: Formicinae
- Tribe: Lasiini
- Genus: Pseudolasius; Emery, 1887

Type species
- Formica familiaris

Diversity
- 50 species

Synonyms
- Nesolasius Wheeler, 1935

= Pseudolasius =

Genus of ants

Pseudolasius is a genus of ants in the subfamily Formicinae. The genus is known from southern Asia (from India to China) to northern Australia, where it appears to be restricted to tropical areas.

== Species ==
- Pseudolasius amaurops Emery, 1922
- Pseudolasius amblyops Forel, 1901
- Pseudolasius australis Forel, 1915
- Pseudolasius badius Viehmeyer, 1916
- Pseudolasius bidenticlypeus Xu, 1997
- Pseudolasius binghami Emery, 1911
- Pseudolasius breviceps Emery, 1887
- Pseudolasius butteli Forel, 1913
- Pseudolasius caecus Donisthorpe, 1949
- Pseudolasius carinatus Karavaiev, 1929
- Pseudolasius cibdelus Wu & Wang, 1992
- Pseudolasius circularis Viehmeyer, 1916
- Pseudolasius diversus Wachkoo & Bharti, 2014
- Pseudolasius emeryi Forel, 1911
- Pseudolasius fallax Emery, 1911
- Pseudolasius familiaris (Smith, 1860)
- Pseudolasius hummeli Stitz, 1934
- Pseudolasius isabellae Forel, 1908
- Pseudolasius jacobsoni Crawley, 1924
- Pseudolasius karawajewi Donisthorpe, 1942
- Pseudolasius lasioides Wheeler, 1927
- Pseudolasius leopoldi Santschi, 1932
- Pseudolasius liliputi Forel, 1913
- Pseudolasius longiscapus Wang, W. & Zhao, 2009
- Pseudolasius ludovici Forel, 1913
- Pseudolasius machhediensis Bharti, Gul & Sharma, 2012
- Pseudolasius martini Forel, 1911
- Pseudolasius mayri Emery, 1911
- Pseudolasius minor Donisthorpe, 1947
- Pseudolasius minutissimus Forel, 1913
- Pseudolasius minutus Emery, 1896
- Pseudolasius overbecki Viehmeyer, 1914
- Pseudolasius pallidus Donisthorpe, 1949
- Pseudolasius pheidolinus Emery, 1887
- Pseudolasius polymorphicus Wachkoo & Bharti, 2014
- Pseudolasius pygmaeus Forel, 1913
- Pseudolasius risii Forel, 1894
- Pseudolasius salvazai Santschi, 1920
- Pseudolasius sauteri Forel, 1913
- Pseudolasius sexdentatus Donisthorpe, 1949
- Pseudolasius silvestrii Wheeler, 1927
- Pseudolasius similus Zhou, 2001
- Pseudolasius streesemanni Viehmeyer, 1914
- Pseudolasius sumatrensis (Mayr, 1883)
- Pseudolasius sunda Karavaiev, 1929
- Pseudolasius tenuicornis Emery, 1897
- Pseudolasius trimorphus Karavaiev, 1929
- Pseudolasius typhlops Wheeler, 1935
- Pseudolasius waigeuensis Donisthorpe, 1943
- Pseudolasius zamrood Akbar, Bharti & Wachkoo, 2017
- Pseudolasius zynia Fisher, 2025
