= Leonardoxa africana =

Scientific classification
- Kingdom: Plantae
- Clade: Tracheophytes
- Clade: Angiosperms
- Clade: Eudicots
- Clade: Rosids
- Order: Fabales
- Family: Fabaceae
- Genus: Leonardoxa
- Species: L. africana

Binomial name
- Leonardoxa africana (Baill.) Aubrév. (1968)

Synonyms
- Humboldtia africana Baill. (1870); Schotia africana (Baill.) Bequaert (1922)

Species of tropical tree

Leonardoxa africana is a tropical tree endemic to west-central Africa and southeastern Nigeria. It is divided into four sub-species, of which three are myrmecophytes.

== Subspecies ==
- Leonardoxa africana subsp. africana
- Leonardoxa africana subsp. gracilicaulis McKey
- Leonardoxa africana subsp. letouzeyi McKey
- Leonardoxa africana subsp. rumpiensis McKey

== Description ==
The species grows to a height of between 4-14m tall, its diameter can reach a width of 45 cm but commonly less than 40 cm. Leaves have a pinnately compound arrangement, with 2-4 pairs of leaflets per pinnae but commonly 3 pairs per pinnae; leaflets have a falcate to elliptic shape. Inflorescence is raceme type, 40-60 flowered, position is commonly cauliflorous or ramiflorous, borne on main trunks or twigs but occasionally axillary on young twigs. Pedicel is 2-4 mm long, Calyx is green or red, sepals 0.5-0.8 cm long, petals are commonly violet, pink, mauve, or purple colored.

== Habitat ==
An under-storey tree, it grows near seasonally inundated regions and on dense sands in freshwater rainforest regions of Central Africa.

== Ecology ==
The ant species Petalomyrmex phylax, Aphomomyrmex afer, and Cataulacus mckeyi occupy swollen internodes or domatia of most subspecies of Leonardoxa africana and they feed on the nectaries usually at the base of leaflets and close to the midrib. Petalomyrmex phylax occupy young internodes while Cataulacus mckeyi and Aphomomyrmex afer patrol the basal parts of mature leaves.

== Chemistry ==
Methyl salicylate and hexanones have been identified as two compounds in young and mature leaves of the species.
