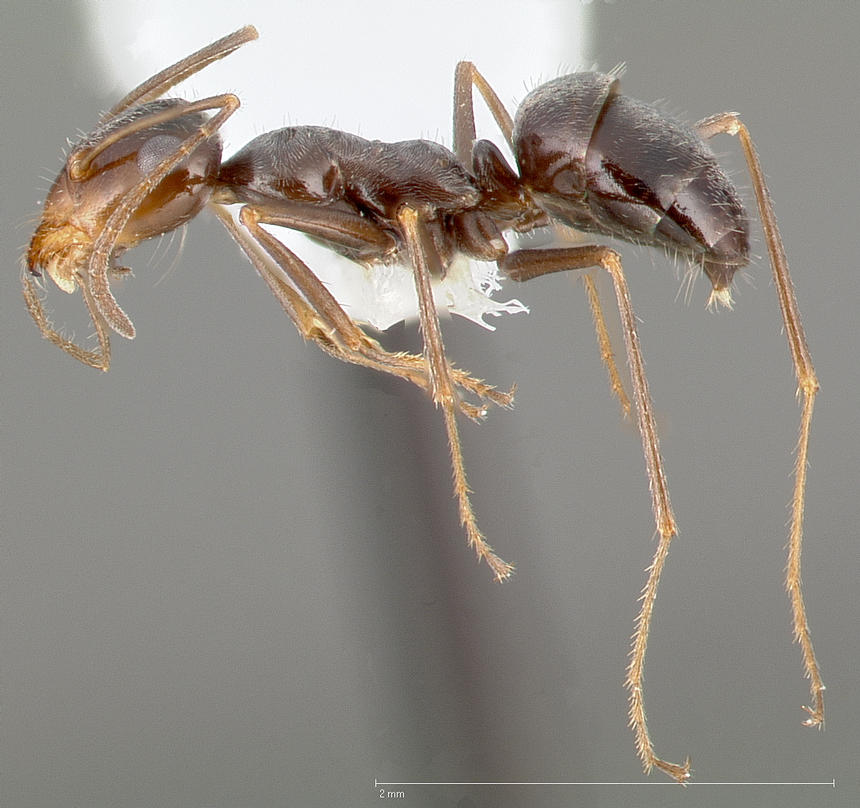

Scientific classification
- Kingdom: Animalia
- Phylum: Arthropoda
- Clade: Pancrustacea
- Class: Insecta
- Order: Hymenoptera
- Family: Formicidae
- Subfamily: Formicinae
- Genus: Myrmecocystus
- Subgenus: Eremnocystus
- Species: M. yuma

Binomial name
- Myrmecocystus yuma Wheeler, 1912

= Myrmecocystus yuma =

Species of ant

Myrmecocystus yuma is a species of honeypot ant native to the southwestern United States and a small part of Northern Mexico. This species, like most in the genus Myrmecocystus, create worker repletes.
