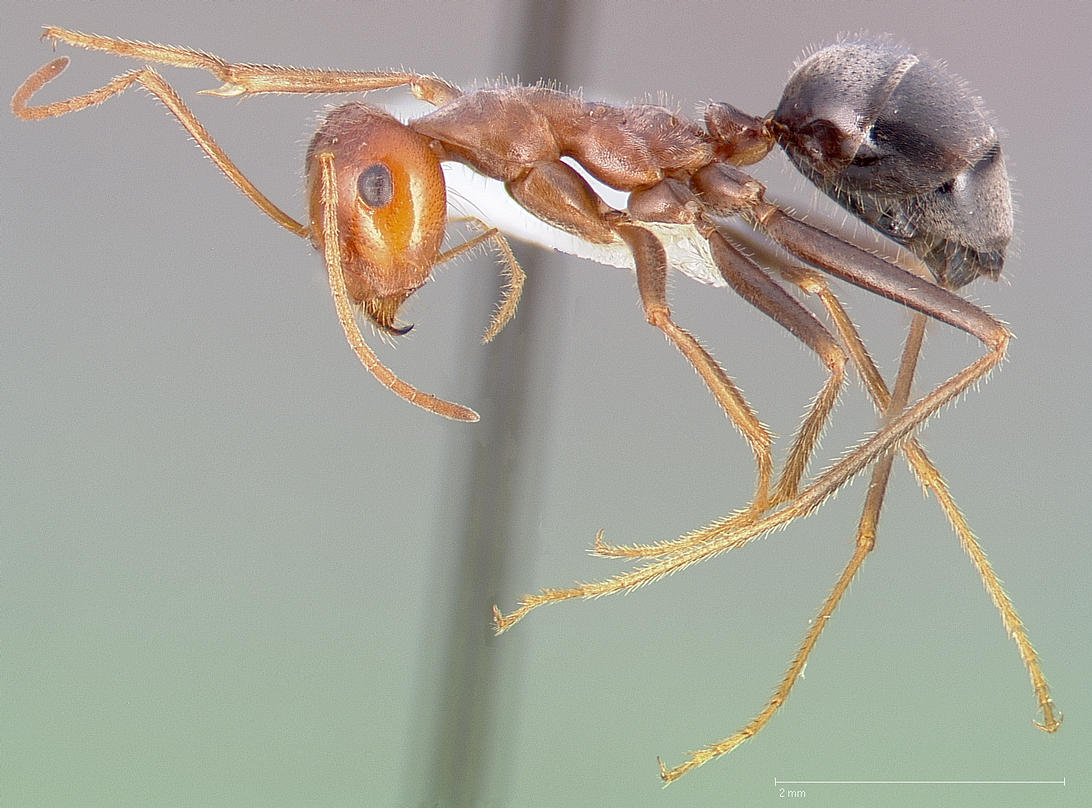
- Profile view of Myrmecocystus semirufus specimen

Scientific classification
- Kingdom: Animalia
- Phylum: Arthropoda
- Class: Insecta
- Order: Hymenoptera
- Family: Formicidae
- Subfamily: Formicinae
- Genus: Myrmecocystus
- Subgenus: Endiodioctes
- Species: M. semirufus

Binomial name
- Myrmecocystus semirufus Emery, 1893

= Myrmecocystus semirufus =

Species of ant

Myrmecocystus semirufus is a species of honeypot ant native to the western United States, Baja California, and Sonora.
