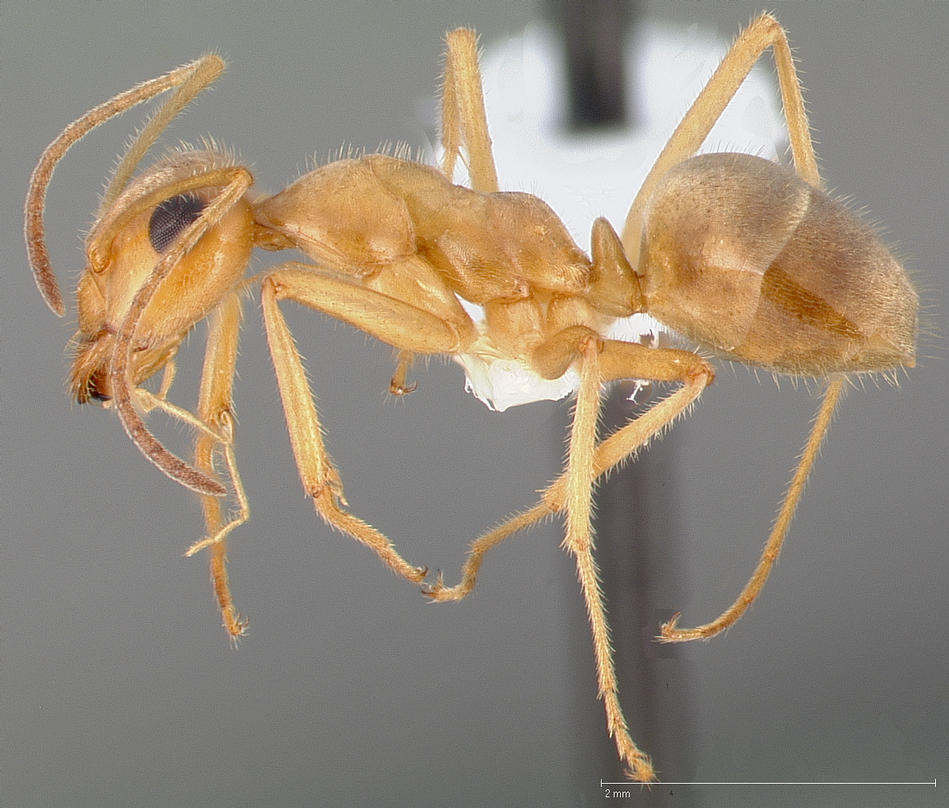
- Myrmecocystus testaceus antweb.org specimen

Scientific classification
- Domain: Eukaryota
- Kingdom: Animalia
- Phylum: Arthropoda
- Class: Insecta
- Order: Hymenoptera
- Family: Formicidae
- Subfamily: Formicinae
- Genus: Myrmecocystus
- Subgenus: Myrmecocystus
- Species: M. testaceus

Binomial name
- Myrmecocystus testaceus Emery, 1893

= Myrmecocystus testaceus =

Myrmecocystus mexicanus

Species of ant

Myrmecocystus testaceus is a species of honeypot ant found throughout the western United States and extreme south British Columbia. It is usually nocturnal, and nests in sand.

They can spray formic acid from their gasters to melt skin tissue. Instead of stinging and swarming, they stretch their prey by the legs until it splits or dies from bites and formic acid.
