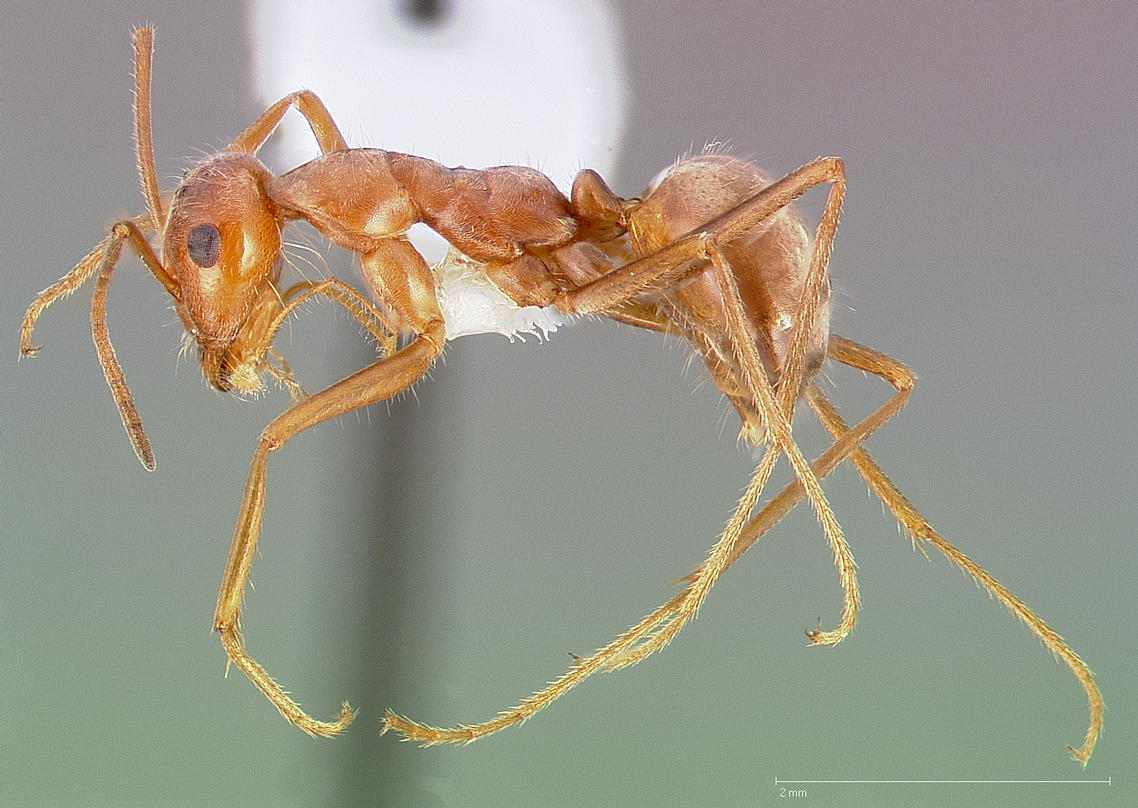
- Myrmecocystus wheeleri antweb.org specimen

Scientific classification
- Domain: Eukaryota
- Kingdom: Animalia
- Phylum: Arthropoda
- Class: Insecta
- Order: Hymenoptera
- Family: Formicidae
- Subfamily: Formicinae
- Genus: Myrmecocystus
- Subgenus: Endiodioctes
- Species: M. wheeleri

Binomial name
- Myrmecocystus wheeleri Snelling, 1971

= Myrmecocystus wheeleri =

Species of ant

Myrmecocystus wheeleri is a species of honeypot ant native to California, Baja California, and Coahuila.
