= Mendax =

Mendax may refer to:

- Mendax (gastropod), a genus of very small sea snails
- Myrmecocystus mendax, a species of ant
- Julian Assange, who used the handle Mendax in his youth as a hacker
