= Polyphenism =

Type of polymorphism where different forms of an animal arise from a single genotype

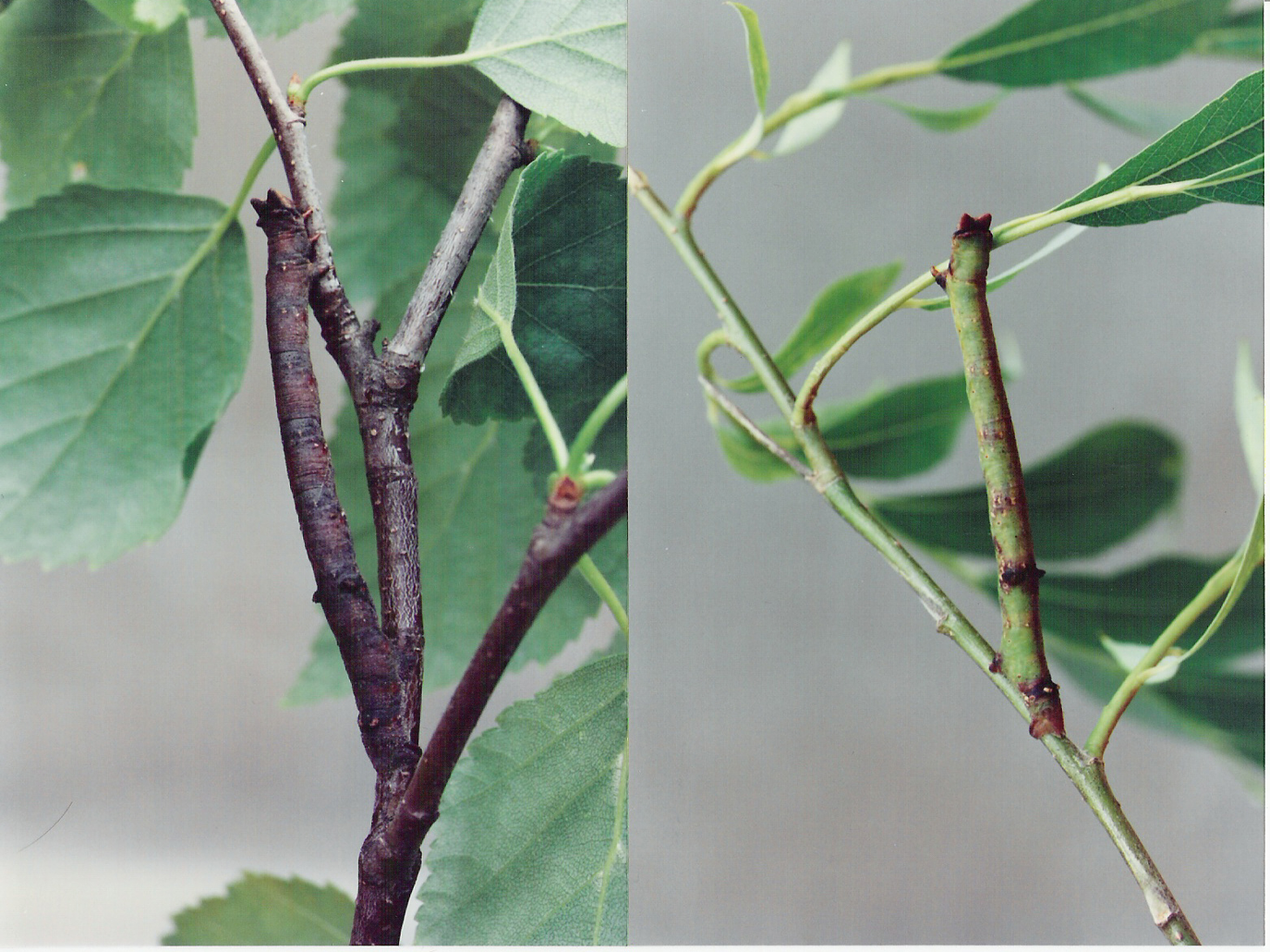
Biston betularia caterpillars on birch (left) and willow (right), demonstrating a color polyphenism.

A polyphenic trait is a trait for which multiple, discrete phenotypes can arise from a single genotype as a result of differing environmental conditions. It is therefore a special case of phenotypic plasticity.

There are several types of polyphenism in animals, from having sex determined by the environment to the castes of honey bees and other social insects. Some polyphenisms are seasonal, as in some butterflies which have different patterns during the year, and some Arctic animals like the snowshoe hare and Arctic fox, which are white in winter. Other animals have predator-induced or resource polyphenisms, allowing them to exploit variations in their environment. Some nematode worms can develop either into adults or into resting dauer larvae according to resource availability.

== Definition ==
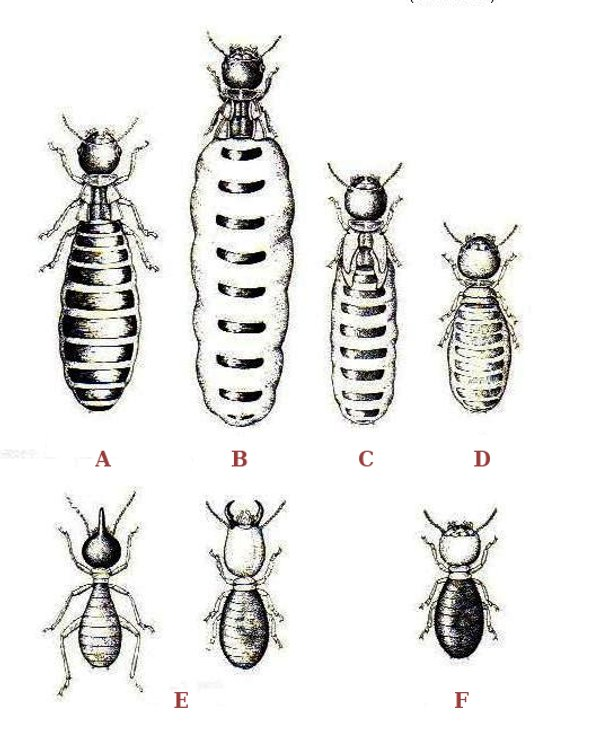
Polyphenism in termites A : Primary king B : Primary queen C : Secondary queen D : Tertiary queen E : Soldiers F : Worker

A polyphenism is the occurrence of several phenotypes in a population, the differences between which are not the result of genetic differences. For example, crocodiles possess a temperature-dependent sex determining polyphenism, where sex is the trait influenced by variations in nest temperature.

When polyphenic forms exist at the same time in the same panmictic (interbreeding) population they can be compared to genetic polymorphism. With polyphenism, the switch between morphs is environmental, but with genetic polymorphism the determination of morph is genetic. These two cases have in common that more than one morph is part of the population at any one time. This is rather different from cases where one morph predictably follows another during, for instance, the course of a year. In essence the latter is normal ontogeny where young forms can and do have different forms, colours and habits to adults.

The discrete nature of polyphenic traits differentiates them from traits like weight and height, which are also dependent on environmental conditions but vary continuously across a spectrum. When a polyphenism is present, an environmental cue causes the organism to develop along a separate pathway, resulting in distinct morphologies; thus, the response to the environmental cue is "all or nothing." The nature of these environmental conditions varies greatly, and includes seasonal cues like temperature and moisture, pheromonal cues, kairomonal cues (signals released from one species that can be recognized by another), and nutritional cues.

== Types ==
=== Sex determination ===
Sex-determining polyphenisms allow a species to benefit from sexual reproduction while permitting an unequal gender ratio. This can be beneficial to a species because a large female-to-male ratio maximizes reproductive capacity. However, temperature-dependent sex determination (as seen in crocodiles) limits the range in which a species can exist, and makes the species susceptible to endangerment by changes in weather pattern. Temperature-dependent sex determination has been proposed as an explanation for the extinction of the dinosaurs.

Population-dependent and reversible sex determination, found in animals such as the blue wrasse fish, have less potential for failure. In the blue wrasse, only one male is found in a given territory: larvae within the territory develop into females, and adult males will not enter the same territory. If a male dies, one of the females in his territory becomes male, replacing him. While this system ensures that there will always be a mating couple when two animals of the same species are present, it could potentially decrease genetic variance in a population, for example if the females remain in a single male's territory.

=== Insect castes ===
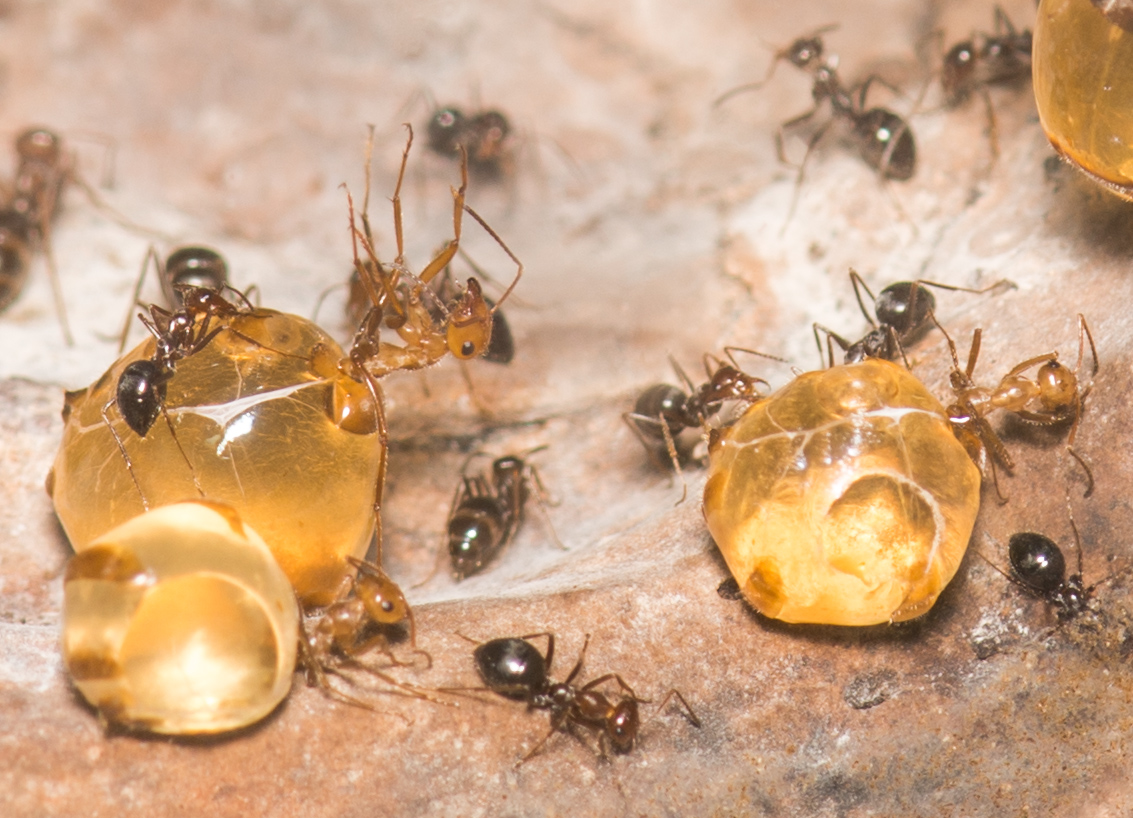
Insect castes: Replete and worker honeypot ants Myrmecocystus mimicus

The caste system of insects enables eusociality, the division of labor between non-breeding and breeding individuals. A series of polyphenisms determines whether larvae develop into queens, workers, and, in some cases soldiers. In the case of the ant, P. morrisi, an embryo must develop under certain temperature and photoperiod conditions in order to become a reproductively-active queen. This allows for control of the mating season but, like sex determination, limits the spread of the species into certain climates. In bees, extra royal jelly provided by worker bees causes a developing larva to become a queen. Royal jelly is fed to all larvae, but queen larvae are fed with almost exclusively royal jelly. This system is less subject to influence by environmental conditions, yet prevents unnecessary production of queens.

=== Seasonal ===
Polyphenic pigmentation is adaptive for insect species that undergo multiple mating seasons each year. Different pigmentation patterns provide appropriate camouflage throughout the seasons, as well as alter heat retention as temperatures change. Because insects cease growth and development after eclosion, their pigment pattern is invariable in adulthood: thus, a polyphenic pigment adaptation would be less valuable for species whose adult form survives longer than one year.

Seasonal polyphenism in Junonia almana
Wet season	Dry season
upper side	upper side
underside	underside

Birds and mammals are capable of continued physiological changes in adulthood, and some display reversible seasonal polyphenisms, such as in the Arctic fox, which becomes all white in winter as snow camouflage.

=== Predator-induced ===
Predator-induced polyphenisms allow the species to develop in a more reproductively-successful way in a predator's absence, but to otherwise assume a more defensible morphology. However, this can fail if the predator evolves to stop producing the kairomone to which the prey responds. For example, the midge larvae (Chaoborus) that feed on Daphnia cucullata (a water flea) release a kairomone that Daphnia can detect. When the midge larvae are present, Daphnia grow large helmets that protect them from being eaten. However, when the predator is absent, Daphnia have smaller heads and are therefore more agile swimmers.

=== Resource ===
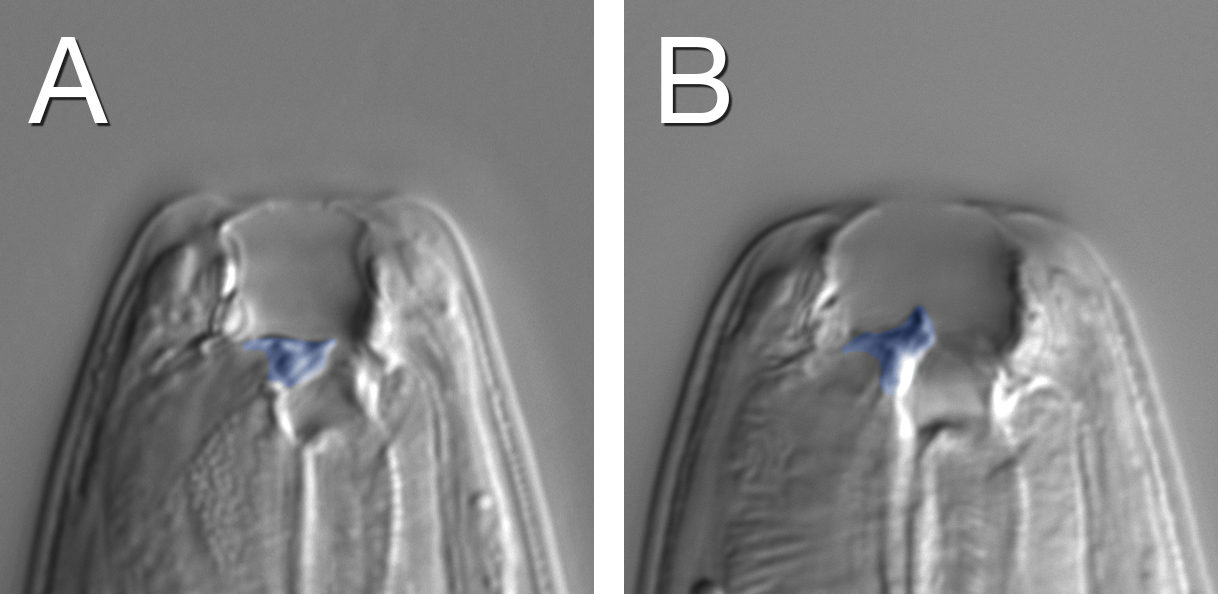
Mouth polyphenism in the nematode Pristionchus pacificus A : bacterivorous "stenostomatous" morph B : predatory "eurystomatous" morph

Organisms with resource polyphenisms show alternative phenotypes that allow differential use of food or other resources. One example is the western spadefoot toad, which maximizes its reproductive capacity in temporary desert ponds. While the water is at a safe level, the tadpoles develop slowly on a diet of other opportunistic pond inhabitants. However, when the water level is low and desiccation is imminent, the tadpoles develop a morphology (wide mouth, strong jaw) that permits them to cannibalize. Cannibalistic tadpoles receive better nutrition and thus metamorphose more quickly, avoiding death as the pond dries up.

Among invertebrates, the nematode Pristionchus pacificus has one morph that primarily feeds on bacteria and a second morph that produces large teeth, enabling it to feed on other nematodes, including competitors for bacterial food. In this species, cues of starvation and crowding by other nematodes, as sensed by pheromones, trigger a hormonal signal that ultimately activates a developmental switch gene that specifies formation of the predatory morph.

=== Density-dependent ===
Density-dependent polyphenism allows species to show a different phenotype based on the population density in which it was reared. In Lepidoptera, African armyworm larvae exhibit one of two appearances: the gregarious or solitary phase. Under crowded or "gregarious" conditions, the larvae have black bodies and yellow stripes along their bodies. However, under solitary conditions, they have green bodies with a brown stripe down their backs. The different phenotypes emerge during the third instar and remain until the last instar.

=== Dauer diapause in nematodes ===
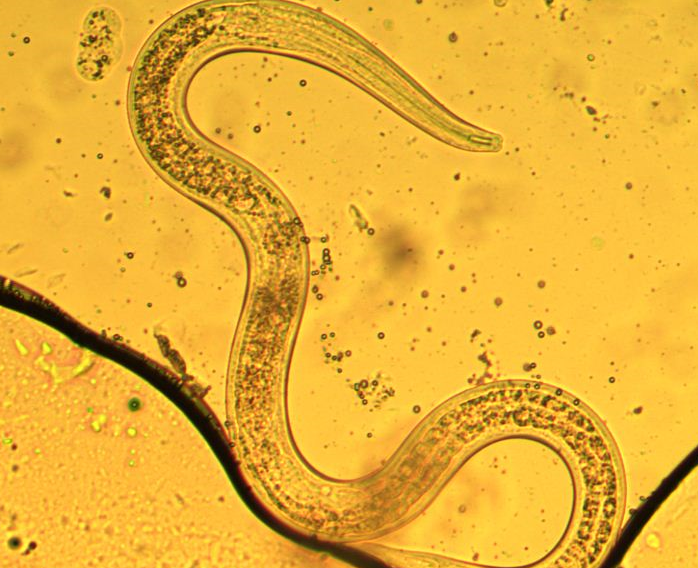
Third stage dauer larva (resting stage) of Phasmarhabditis hermaphrodita

Under conditions of stress such as crowding and high temperature, L2 larvae of some free living nematodes such as Caenorhabditis elegans can switch development to the so-called dauer larva state, instead of going the normal molts into a reproductive adult. These dauer larvae are a stress-resistant, non-feeding, long-lived stage, enabling the animals to survive harsh conditions. On return to favorable conditions, the animal resumes reproductive development from L3 stage onwards.

== Evolution ==
A mechanism has been proposed for the evolutionary development of polyphenisms:

1. A mutation results in a novel, heritable trait.
2. The trait's frequency expands in the population, creating a population on which selection can act.
3. Pre-existing (background) genetic variation in other genes results in phenotypic differences in expression of the new trait.
4. These phenotypic differences undergo selection; as genotypic differences narrow, the trait becomes:
  1. Genetically fixed (non-responsive to environmental conditions)
  2. Polyphenic (responsive to environmental conditions)

Evolution of novel polyphenisms through this mechanism has been demonstrated in the laboratory. Suzuki and Nijhout used an existing mutation (black) in a monophenic green hornworm (Manduca sexta) that causes a black phenotype. They found that if larvae from an existing population of black mutants were raised at 20˚C, then all the final instar larvae were black; but if the larvae were instead raised at 28˚C, the final instar larvae ranged in color from black to green. By selecting for larvae that were black if raised at 20˚C but green if raised at 28˚C, they produced a polyphenic strain after thirteen generations.

This fits the model described above because a new mutation (black) was required to reveal pre-existing genetic variation and to permit selection. Furthermore, the production of a polyphenic strain was only possible because of background variation within the species: two alleles, one temperature-sensitive and one stable, were present for a single gene upstream of black (in the pigment production pathway) before selection occurred. The temperature-sensitive allele was not observable because at high temperatures, it caused an increase in green pigment in hornworms that were already bright green. However, introduction of the black mutant caused the temperature-dependent changes in pigment production to become obvious. The researchers could then select for larvae with the temperature-sensitive allele, resulting in a polyphenism.

== See also ==
- Phenotypic switching
