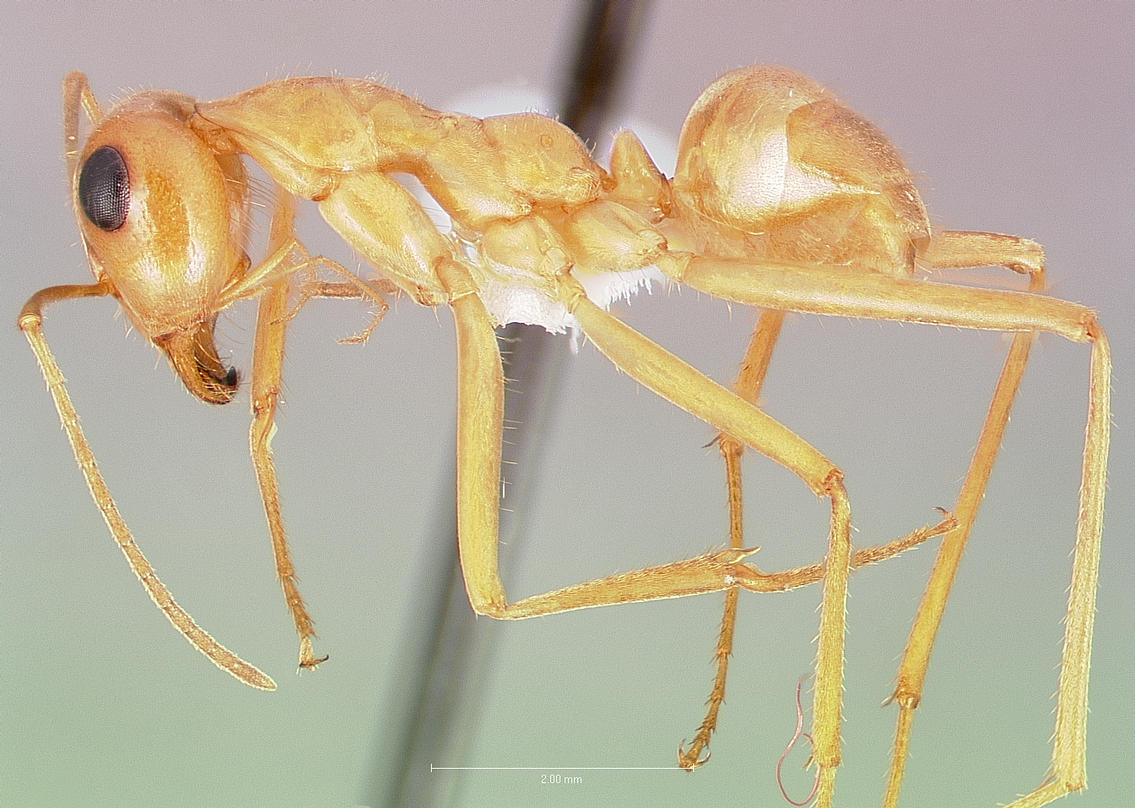
- M. mexicanus worker

Scientific classification
- Kingdom: Animalia
- Phylum: Arthropoda
- Clade: Pancrustacea
- Class: Insecta
- Order: Hymenoptera
- Family: Formicidae
- Subfamily: Formicinae
- Genus: Myrmecocystus
- Subgenus: Myrmecocystus
- Species: M. mexicanus

Binomial name
- Myrmecocystus mexicanus Wesmael, 1838

= Myrmecocystus mexicanus =

Species of ant

Myrmecocystus mexicanus, the Mexican honeypot ant, is a species of ant in the genus Myrmecocystus, which is one of the six genera that bear the common name "honey ant" or "honeypot ant", due to curious behavior where some of the workers will swell with liquid food until they become immobile and hang from the ceilings of nest chambers, acting as living food storage for the colony. Honey ants are found in North America, Australia, and Africa. Ant species belonging to the genus Myrmecocystus reside in North America. M. mexicanus in particular is found in the southwestern United States and parts of Mexico.

== Description ==
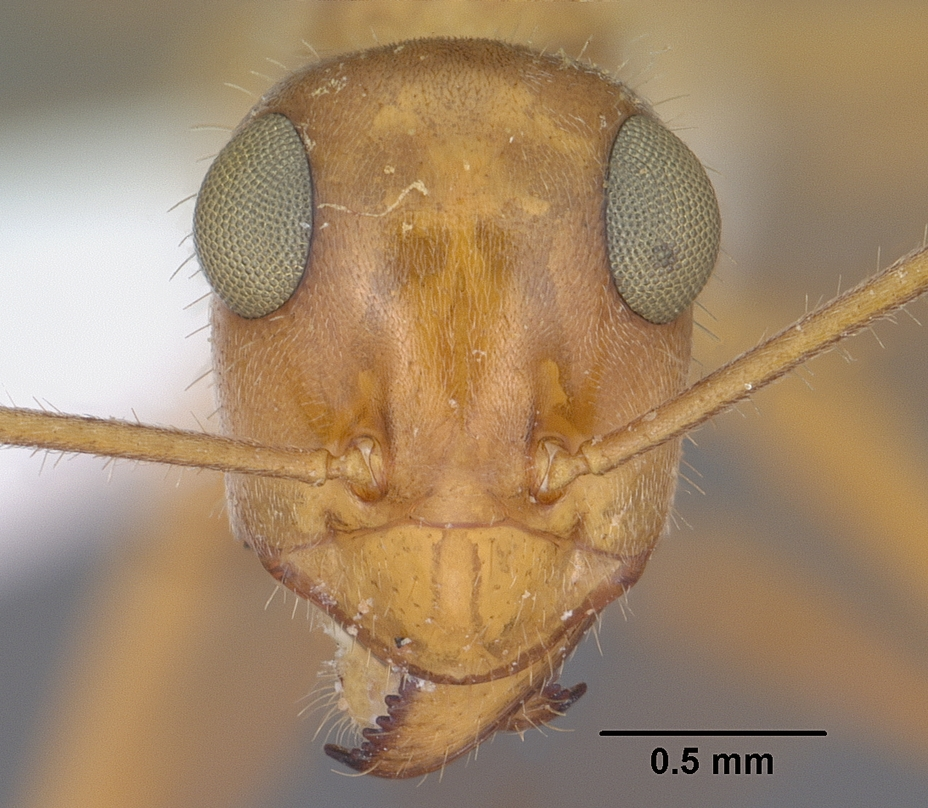
Head view of an M. mexicanus worker

Workers range from 3–7 mm in length and have a light tan thorax, legs and slightly darker head with black mandibles. The gaster is brownish-gray. Queens are roughly 9 mm in length. The head and mandibles are a reddish brown. The thorax is yellowish brown, and the gaster is a lighter shade of yellow. The legs are a dull yellow. Males are typically about 6 mm long and have a small black head and black thorax, except a reddish-brown pronotum. The gaster is a dark brown, and the legs are gray. Males are winged.

== Eusociality ==
M. mexicanus like many ants, wasps and bees, is a eusocial insect species. Eusocial insects are characterized by distinct caste systems, where some individuals breed and most individuals are sterile helpers, and overlapping generations so mother, adult offspring and immature offspring are all living at the same time. In a eusocial colony, an individual is assigned a specialized caste before they become reproductively mature, which makes them behaviorally (and sometimes physiologically) distinct from other castes. The honey pot ants exhibit all of these characteristics within a colony: a queen and males make up the reproductive caste, and the rest of the individuals are sterile female workers.

== Colony life cycle ==
Among other ant species, in degraded grassland in southern Arizona, the M. mexicanus colonies average a life span of 8.9 years and have a maximum life span of 23 years.

=== Reproduction ===
Only two castes in the colony reproduce, the queens and the males. Workers are sterile and tend to the queen and brood. Mating occurs during nuptial flights, where winged queens and males swarm outside the nest.

==== Prenuptial activity ====
The reproductives (winged virgin queens and males) start emerging from their native nest several days prior to nuptial flights, but are encouraged back into the nest by workers. Some reproductives die prior to flying off after not returning to their nest. Hours before the nuptial flight, queens, males and workers emerge from the nest and swarm around the entrance hole. Workers will then even nip at queens on the ground to encourage them to take flight.

==== Nuptial flights ====
To mate, M. mexicanus winged queens and males emerge from an existing colony and swarm in nuptial flights. These flights occur in late July in the evening, typically at about the same time of day when the colony workers begin foraging. The flights usually occur the day after a rain. A normal nuptial flight lasts about an hour and half. After the flight, unmated queens and males return to the nest. The fact that some queens and males return from these flights unmated suggests that aerial union is difficult. The mated queens lose their wings, and the mated males die.

=== Colony founding and development ===
After mating, a queen digs a nest chamber. About two days after her flight, she seals the nest chamber. Conway found that many mated queens after digging and sealing nest chambers did not reappear later on, which could indicate a high mortality rate among newly mated queens. Around five days after the flight, the queen lays eggs in clusters of 5–10. The larvae hatch around 20 days, and begin pupating in cocoons around 10 days after that. Adult workers emerge around 63 days after eggs are laid. Larvae are fed and cared for by the queen and workers. It is believed that the larvae may even be fed eggs and dead workers. The workers in the first brood tend to be smaller than workers in subsequent broods, which is believed to be an adaptation to promote rapid population growth. The average worker lives from 11 to 170 days.

== Population structure ==
Ant colonies consist of a queen mother and her offspring, a majority of which are sterile female workers. These workers gather food, tend to the brood and defend the colony, while the queens' main responsibility is to continue laying eggs. Conway surveyed sixty six M. mexicanus nest colonies located near Garden of the Gods, Colorado Springs, CO. He found that a typical nest consisted of about 5,000 ants. Typically, about 75% to 78% of the total population consisted of workers. About 22 -25% of the colony population consisted of replete workers. In preparation for nuptial flights, nests produce a large number of reproductives. 100-110 males were found in one nest, and 209 queens were found in another.

=== Replete Workers ===
==== Role within the colony ====
The name honeypot ant comes from the peculiar development of replete workers, whose abdomens become so swollen with food that they are used by the rest of the colony as living food storage. They are "drained" during famine, usually the wintertime, to sustain the colony. This behavior is an example of the caste system within ants and other eusocial insects. Repletes are a subset of the sterile "helper" caste.

==== Development ====
In M. mexicanus, replete workers develop from the largest workers in the colony. In fact, if the repletes are removed from a colony, the next largest workers quickly become repletes. Typical workers and callows can develop into repletes in about two weeks. Other workers feed the developing repletes with plant nectar collected in the evenings. The repletes become so swollen that they become immobile, and hang from the ceilings of dome chambers in the underground nest.

==== Morphology ====
When a replete worker fills with food, her crop, or portion of her digestive tract, swells and displaces other abdominal organs. The crop of replete workers expands about four to five times its normal linear dimension when they are fully engorged with food." In M. mexicanus, the size of a replete worker’s abdomen ranges from 6–12 mm in length. As repletes are drained of their food stores, they become "flaccid depletes".

M. mexicanus repletes also vary in the content of their "honey" or food they carry. They can be classified according to the colors of their distended abdomens: dark amber, amber, milky and clear. Each color is thought to correspond with a particular food source. Dark amber and amber repletes contain sugars such as glucose and fructose, mostly likely from the nectar of flowers. Milky repletes contain large amounts of protein and oils, believed to be from insect prey. Clear repletes contain mostly water and sucrose (sugar), so they are thought to act as water storage for the arid climate. Burgett & Young (1974) found that a small percentage of repletes had two visible layers of liquid in their crops– one consisting of sugars, and the other of lipids, glycerol and cholesterol esters.

== Foraging ==
=== Food sources ===
M. mexicanus collects food mainly in the form of nectar from yucca plants (Yucca glauca) and sugary galls formed on scrub oaks (Quercus gambelii). The gall wasp (Holcaspis perniciosus) forms the galls (rotund growths) along scrub oak branches, and these galls leak a clear sugary liquid on which the ants feed. Additionally, these ants feed on a variety of flower nectars, cacti fruit, and the excretions of aphids feeding on yucca plants. Workers will also collect dead insects and attack small, soft bodied insects. In particular, M. mexicanus tends to feed on dead and moribund harvester ants (Pogonomyrmex occidentalis).

=== Foraging behavior ===
As workers forage, their abdomens become clear and distended, similar to replete workers. When they return to the nest, they regurgitate their collected nectar into replete workers for storage. March through November is the typical foraging time for M. mexicanus. The summer months are when most nectar is collected. The ants forage in cooler temperatures ranging from 0.5 to 30 °C (32.9 to 86.0 °F) and mainly during the night. The lower temperature preference is most likely an adaptation to allow for nocturnal foraging in desert climates.

Workers forage up to 20 meters (66 feet) away from the entrance of their nest. They exhibit both radial and path foraging patterns. Radial foraging (when the ants spread out radially from the nest entrance) happens mainly early in the season, when the ants are searching for nectar sources. Path foraging (when the ants follow frequently traveled paths) occurs later in the season once paths to nectar sources have been established.

=== Interference ===
Other species of ants such as Conomyrma bicolor has been known to drop stones around the entrances of M. mexicanus nests. This behavior usually happens if the two species have colony entrances within 3 meters of each other. The two species have similar foraging times and food sources which creates competition between the colonies. The foraging of a M. mexicanus colony can decrease drastically due to this stone dropping technique.

== Nest location ==
Founding queens appear to prefer to place their nests on top of ridges and mesas.

The nest entrances are typically located out in the open, and the colonies will move their entrances if their original entrance hole (tumulus) becomes shaded. M. mexicanus are nocturnal foragers and prefer lower temperatures between 15 and 20 °C (59 and 68 °F). Therefore, it may be critical for them to have uncovered entrances so that the soil can cool off quickly after sunset and allow them to forage sooner.

In a study conducted by Cole, Haight & Wiernasz (2001), M. mexicanus nests have been observed to be closely associated with nests of Pogonomyrmex occidentalis (harvester ants). M. mexicanus feeds on dead and nearly dead P. occidentalis workers, accounting for this close association. Of the 145 food items collected by M. mexicanus workers, 110 items were dead P. occidentalis workers and two were living workers. Nests of M. mexicanus on average were spaced 5–10 meters away from P. occidentalis nests, but a decent fraction of nests were found closer than 3 meters away.

== Predation ==
M. mexicanus appears to not have many natural predators. Coyotes and badgers have been observed digging up colonies of ants.

== Relationship to humans ==
The repletes of M. mexicanus and other honey ants were delicacies for the Native Americans residing in the southwest U.S. and parts of Mexico. The Natives called them "nequacatl" and would consume the swollen bellies of the ants. Mexicans would also use the "honey" from the replete ants in medicines and food, as well as ferment it for alcoholic beverages.

At the Information Center of the Devil's Punch Bowl Natural Area in southern California a colony of M. mexicanus is kept in a glass jar. According to the desk officer the colony has been kept there since around May 2016, feeding on brown sugar and fish food flakes. Workers leave the jar around sunset, to collect the food.
