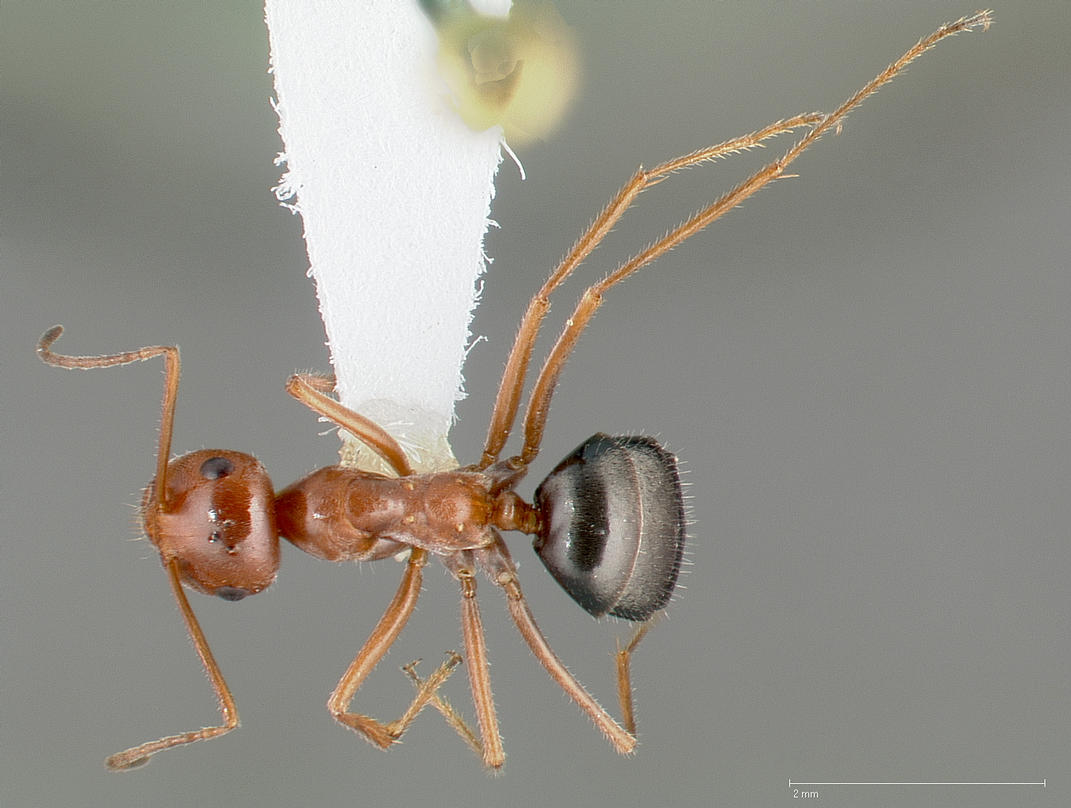

Scientific classification
- Domain: Eukaryota
- Kingdom: Animalia
- Phylum: Arthropoda
- Class: Insecta
- Order: Hymenoptera
- Family: Formicidae
- Subfamily: Formicinae
- Genus: Myrmecocystus
- Subgenus: Endiodioctes
- Species: M. kennedyi

Binomial name
- Myrmecocystus kennedyi Snelling, 1969

= Myrmecocystus kennedyi =

Species of ant

Myrmecocystus kennedyi is a species of honeypot ant in the subgenus Endiodioctes native to the western United States and western Mexico.
