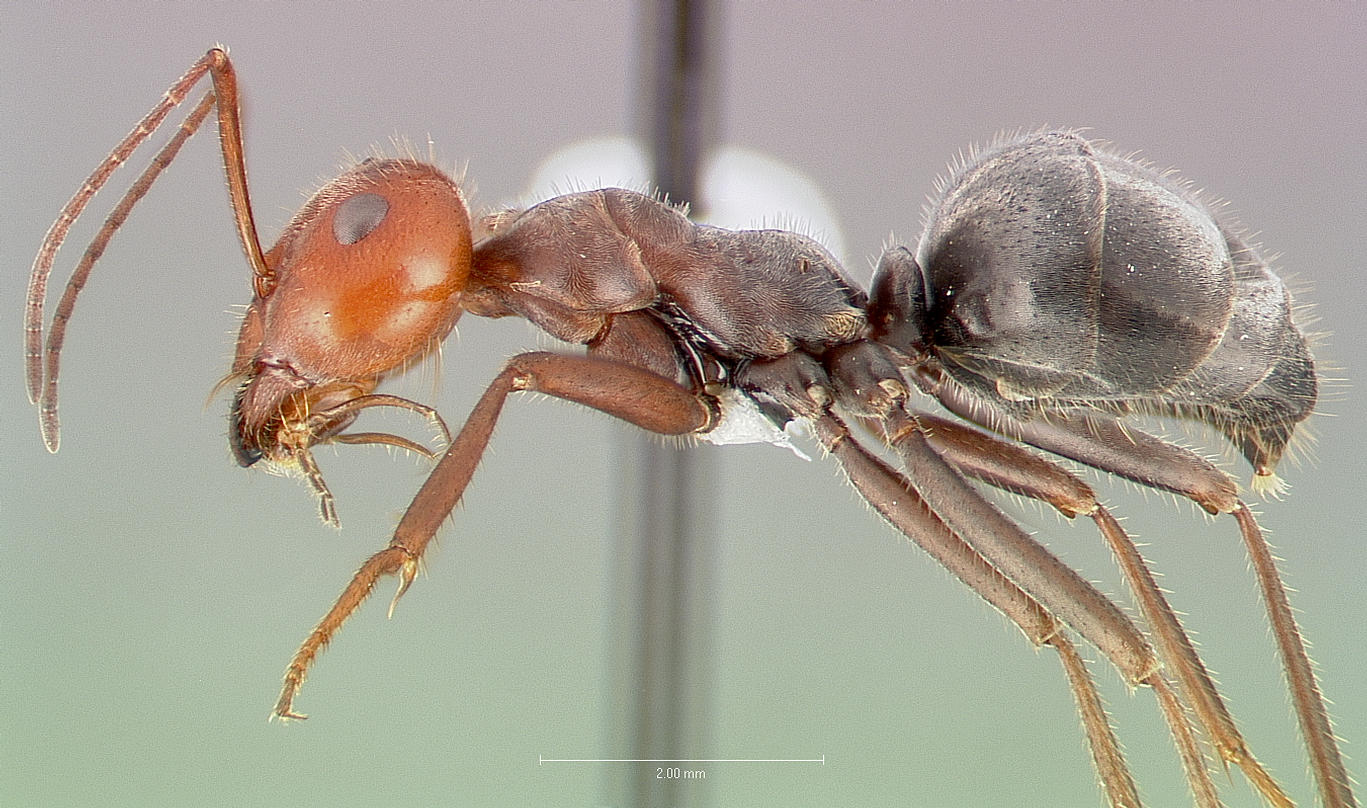
- Myrmecocystus placodops antweb.org specimen

Scientific classification
- Domain: Eukaryota
- Kingdom: Animalia
- Phylum: Arthropoda
- Class: Insecta
- Order: Hymenoptera
- Family: Formicidae
- Subfamily: Formicinae
- Genus: Myrmecocystus
- Subgenus: Endiodioctes
- Species: M. placodops

Binomial name
- Myrmecocystus placodops Forel, 1908

= Myrmecocystus placodops =

Species of ant

Myrmecocystus placodops is a species of honeypot ant native to the southwestern United States and northern Mexico.
