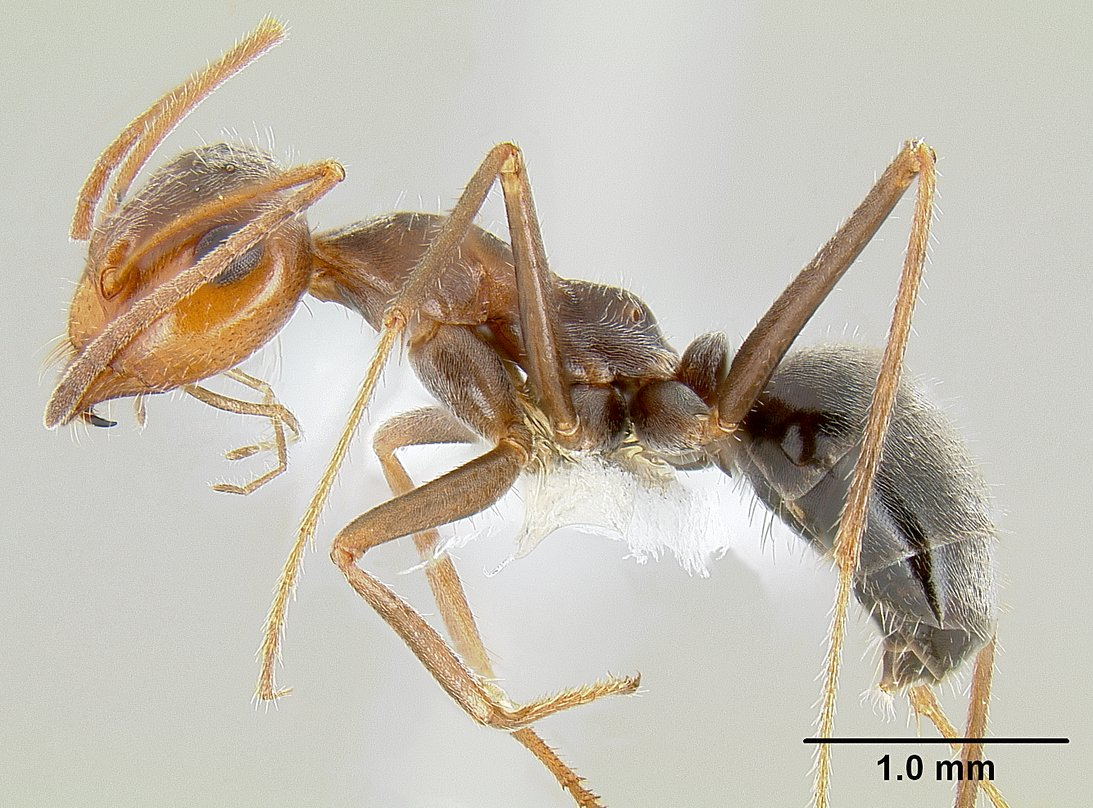

Scientific classification
- Domain: Eukaryota
- Kingdom: Animalia
- Phylum: Arthropoda
- Class: Insecta
- Order: Hymenoptera
- Family: Formicidae
- Subfamily: Formicinae
- Tribe: Lasiini
- Genus: Myrmecocystus
- Subgenus: Endiodioctes
- Species: M. flaviceps

Binomial name
- Myrmecocystus flaviceps Wheeler, 1912

= Myrmecocystus flaviceps =

Species of ant

Myrmecocystus flaviceps is a species of honeypot ant in the subgenus Endiodioctes native to the western United States, western Mexico, and Hidalgo.
