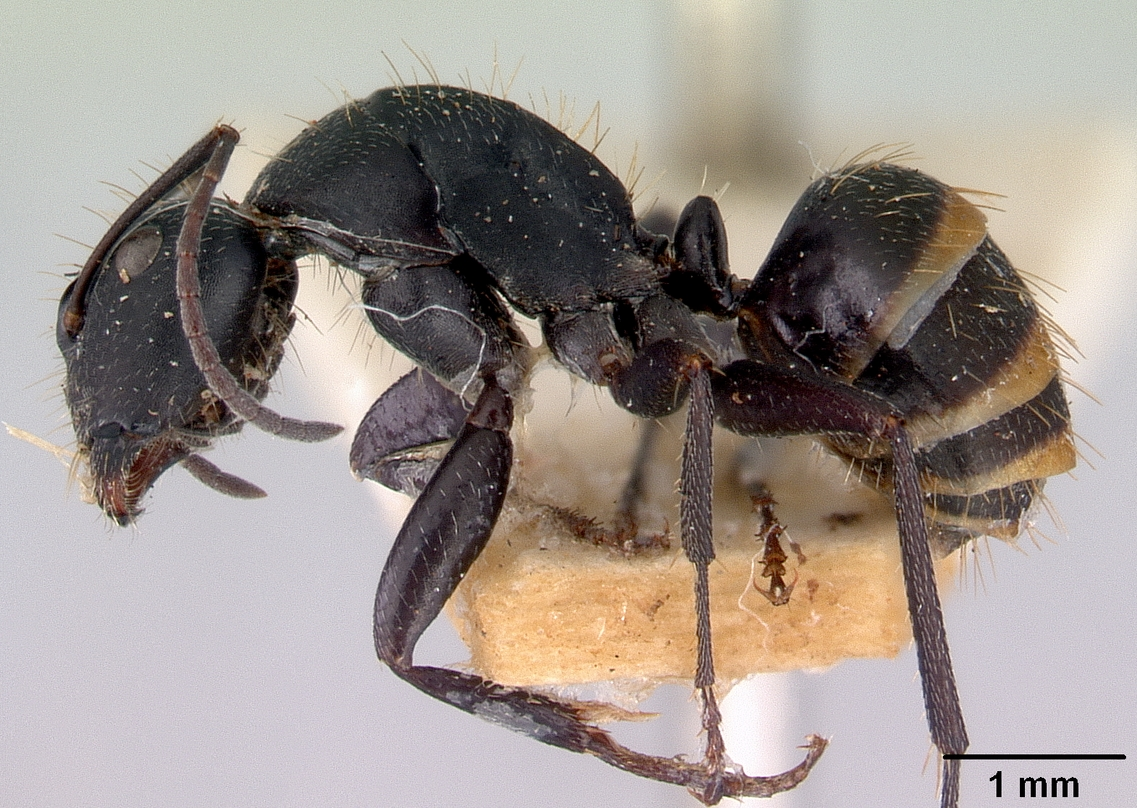

Scientific classification
- Kingdom: Animalia
- Phylum: Arthropoda
- Clade: Pancrustacea
- Class: Insecta
- Order: Hymenoptera
- Family: Formicidae
- Subfamily: Formicinae
- Genus: Camponotus
- Subgenus: Myrmophyma
- Species: C. inflatus

Binomial name
- Camponotus inflatus Lubbock, 1880

Synonyms
- Camponotus aurofasciatus Wheeler, 1915

= Camponotus inflatus =

Species of ant

Camponotus inflatus, also called the Australian honey ant and black honey ant, is a species of carpenter ant native to Australia. Its workers can be used as repletes like honeypot ants, and Aboriginal Australians traditionally eat the repletes as food. They have many names in the Australian Aboriginal languages, including "Wuukurta" and "Yarumpa", and they are considered a local delicacy.

== Description ==
C. inflatus is part of the genus Camponotus, a diverse genus distributed globally containing over 1,500 species commonly called carpenter ants or sugar ants. The species itself is part of the subgenus Myrmophyma, the bladder-head carpenter ants. The worker ants range from five to eight millimetres (0.20 to 0.31 in), but repletes can swell up to seventeen millimetres (0.67 in). The size of the queen and male are unpublished, but their physical characteristics are described by Lubbock (1896). They are black with paler legs and antennae. Their nest entrances have no surrounding mound and are 0.25 inches (0.64 cm) wide and one inch (2.5 cm) deep. The nests consist of a central shaft measuring five to six feet (150 to 180 cm) and many chambers branching out. Most repletes are gathered in the bottom chamber, which is often the largest. The nests are located in a variety of sandy biomes. The repletes form half of the entire colony population.

== Distribution ==
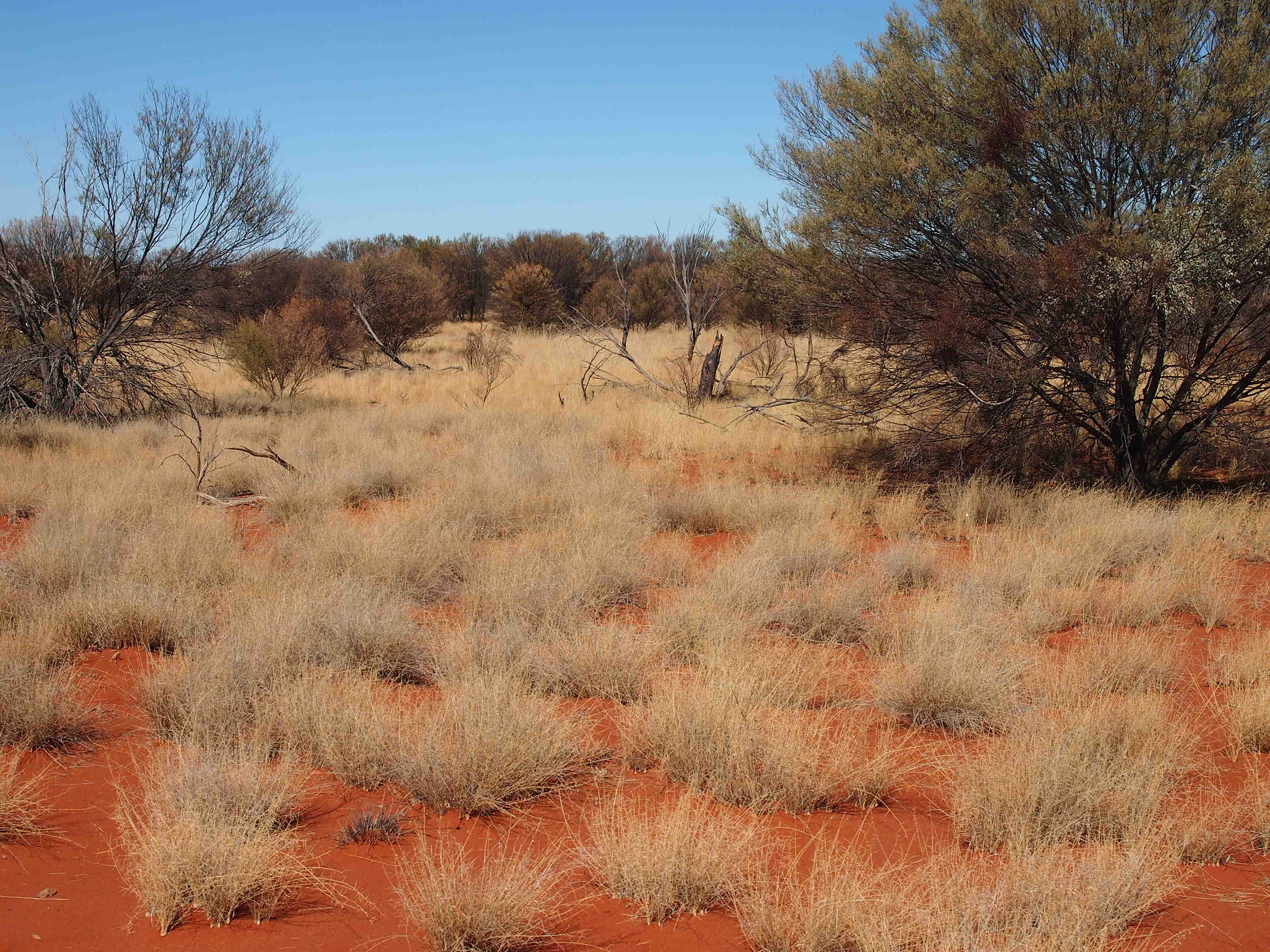
A mulga tree, the ant's preferred food source and nest site

C. inflatus is found in all seven states of mainland Australia, however most common in the deserts of central Australia. They typically nest at the base of mulga trees.

== Honey ==
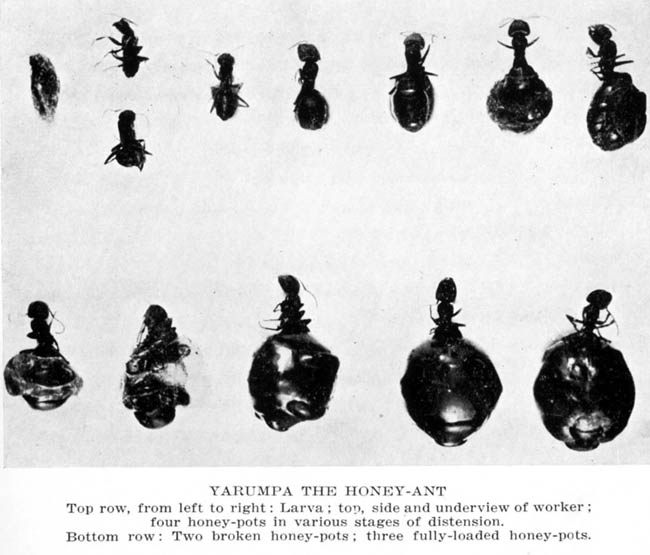
A series of C. inflatus specimens including larvae, normal workers, and repletes

C. inflatus is part of a group of taxonomically distinct but specialized ant species known as honeypot ants. In the nests, specialized worker ants called repletes store large amounts of food in their abdomens, and function as living food storage for the colony. The repletes can perform trophallaxis and regurgitate their food when needed. They are immobile, must be tended to by the other workers, and are found mostly in the deeper chambers of their nest. C. inflatus usually collects nectar from aphids on mulga trees but have also been observed feeding in nectaries on corkwood and fuchsia flowers. The species has been the target of many recent studies regarding ant honey, which the repletes store in their abdomens. Dong et al. 2023 found that ant honey possesses antibiotic and antifungal properties and that the ants' gut microbiota are dominated by Blochmannia bacteria, like most other Camponotus, and Neocelosporium fungi. Specifically, the honey has strong activity against Staphylococcus aureus bacteria and Cryptococcus and Aspergillus fungi, however, the mechanisms and chemical properties of the ant honey is significantly different from honeybee honey from jarrah and manuka. It is less viscous and less sweet than honeybee honey, but contains large amounts of antioxidants.

== Traditional use ==
Aboriginal Australians have been harvesting these ants' honey for thousands of years to treat minor ailments like sore throats or infections. Called "Yarumpa" by the Arrernte people, many tribes of the Aboriginal Australians harvest the repletes in large amounts, often digging large chunks out of the sand to locate the nests. They are valued as a rare source of sugar during the dry months. Traditionally, only the women would harvest these ants while the men would go out and hunt; it was also viewed as a valuable opportunity for children to learn. This species has heavily influenced the Aboriginal Australians' culture, and many of their traditions revolve around this ant.
