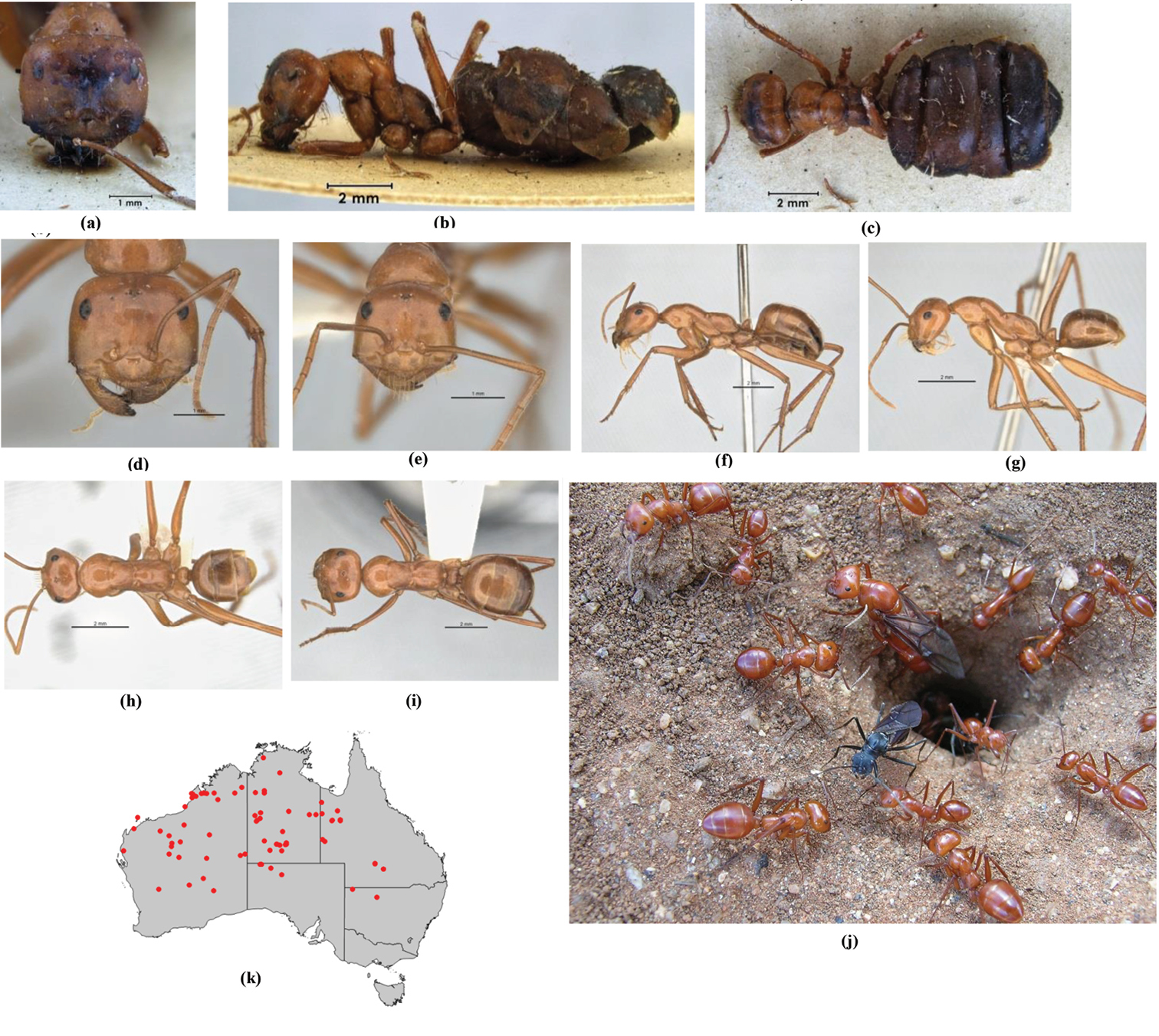

Scientific classification
- Kingdom: Animalia
- Phylum: Arthropoda
- Class: Insecta
- Order: Hymenoptera
- Family: Formicidae
- Subfamily: Formicinae
- Genus: Melophorus
- Species: M. bagoti

Binomial name
- Melophorus bagoti Lubbock, 1883

= Melophorus bagoti =

Species of ant endemic to Australia

Melophorus bagoti, the red honey ant, is an Australian species of desert ant in the subfamily Formicinae.

== Distribution and habitat ==
Widespread in arid Central Australia, the species inhabits low-shrub and grassland deserts, where it builds fairly large underground nests.

== Foraging and feeding habits ==
The outdoor activity is mainly restricted to the hotter summer months, when the ants are active during the heat of the day. Foragers usually begin their activity at soil surface temperatures of about 50 °C and continue to forage when soil temperatures are above 70 °C. They forage solitarily for food such as dead insects, seeds, and sugary plant exudates and are well known for their ability to store liquids in the abdomens of specialized workers, the so-called repletes or "honey pots", hence their common name "red honey ant" (the genus name Melophorus means "honey carrier").

== Colony founding ==
Nest relocation is possibly aided by trail laying behavior, which is highly unusual for solitary foraging desert ants. The founding stage of an ant colony is usually characterized by the same sequence of events. Reproduction occurs in synchronized mating flights, which are probably triggered by rain. The virgin queen leaves the nest in a mating flight and is inseminated by one or several males, and there is circumstantial evidence that males are chemically attracted to queens. She then looks for a new nest site and starts excavating a small nest, where she lays eggs and rears a small brood. The queens found new colonies independently and without the help of other queens or workers; this mode of colony founding is common in formicine ants. However, nothing is known about the number of queens in later colony stages or other populations of M. bagoti.
