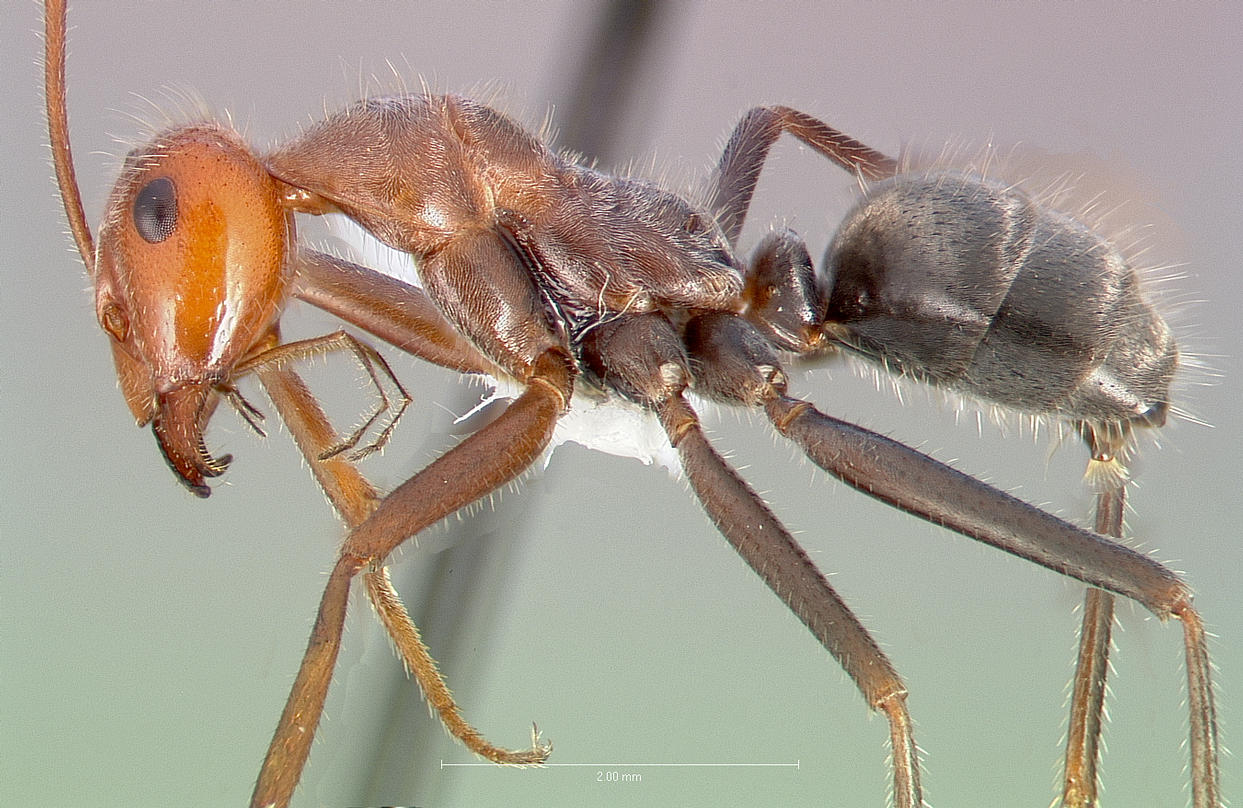

Scientific classification
- Domain: Eukaryota
- Kingdom: Animalia
- Phylum: Arthropoda
- Class: Insecta
- Order: Hymenoptera
- Family: Formicidae
- Subfamily: Formicinae
- Tribe: Lasiini
- Genus: Myrmecocystus
- Subgenus: Endiodioctes
- Species: M. mendax

Binomial name
- Myrmecocystus mendax Wheeler, 1908

= Myrmecocystus mendax =

Species of ant

Myrmecocystus mendax is a species of honeypot ant native to Mexico and Southwestern United States.
