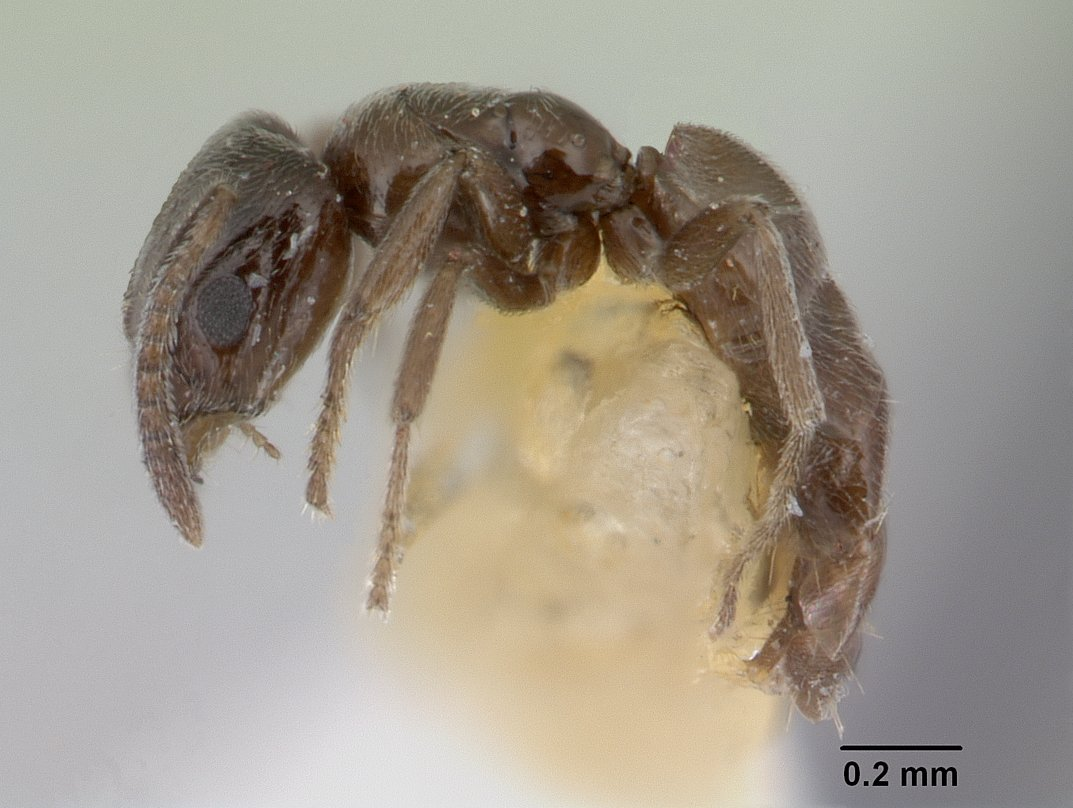
- A. meridionalis worker

Scientific classification
- Domain: Eukaryota
- Kingdom: Animalia
- Phylum: Arthropoda
- Class: Insecta
- Order: Hymenoptera
- Family: Formicidae
- Subfamily: Formicinae
- Tribe: Plagiolepidini
- Genus: Agraulomyrmex; Prins, 1983

Type species
- Agraulomyrmex meridionalis Prins, 1983

Diversity
- 2 species

= Agraulomyrmex =

Genus of ants

Agraulomyrmex is a genus of ants in the subfamily Formicinae. The genus is known from southern Africa.

== Species ==
- Agraulomyrmex meridionalis Prins, 1983 – South Africa
- Agraulomyrmex wilsoni Prins, 1983 – Zimbabwe
