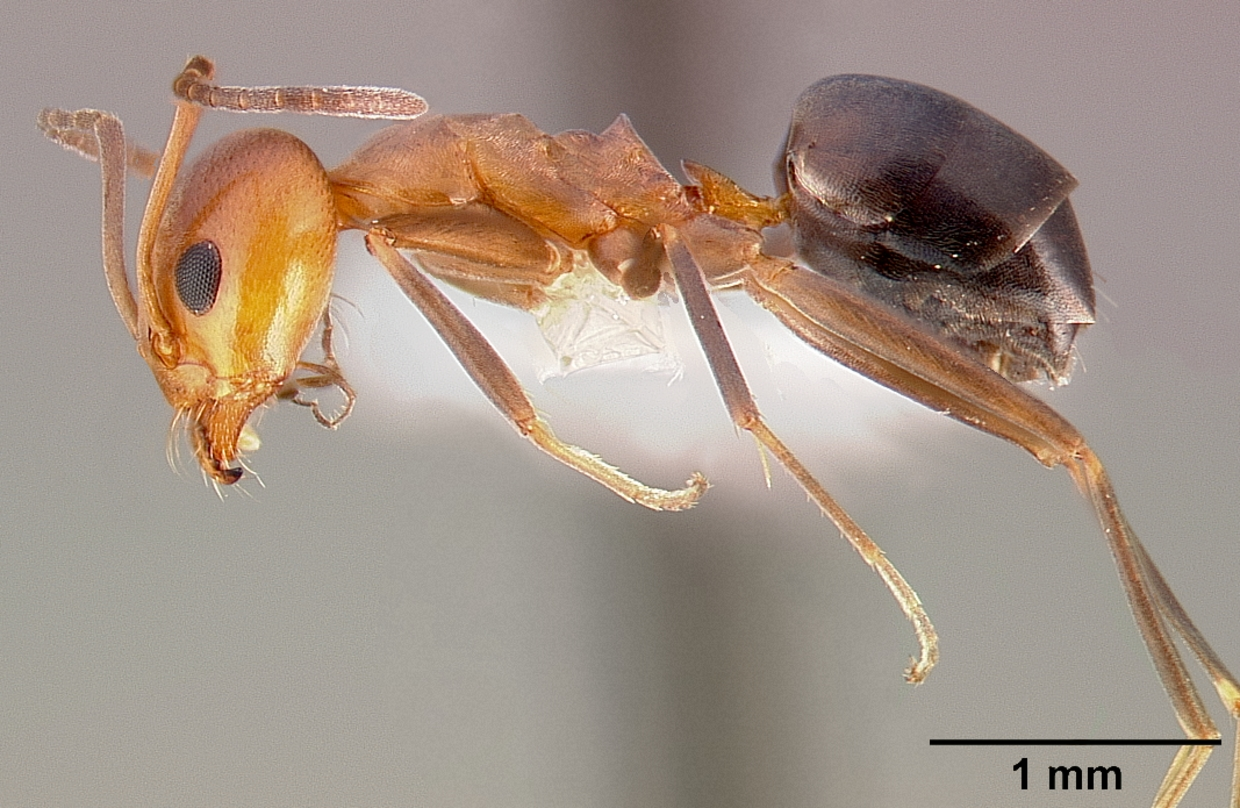
- Dorymyrmex bicolor worker

Scientific classification
- Kingdom: Animalia
- Phylum: Arthropoda
- Class: Insecta
- Order: Hymenoptera
- Family: Formicidae
- Subfamily: Dolichoderinae
- Genus: Dorymyrmex
- Species: D. bicolor

Binomial name
- Dorymyrmex bicolor Wheeler, 1906

= Dorymyrmex bicolor =

Species of ant

Dorymyrmex bicolor is a species of ant in the Dolichoderinae subfamily, known as the bicolored pyramid ant due to the two-toned body color and the shape of their mounds. Dorymyrmex bicolor was recently known as Conomyrma bicolor but has been renamed to Dorymyrmex bicolor. It has a single petiole and a slit-like orifice which releases chemical compounds. This ant does not have the capability to sting. It is primarily found in arid desert regions in Central and South America and the southwestern United States.

== Tool use ==
Dorymyrmex bicolor regularly interacts with three different species of Myrmecocystus, another genus of ants. Between the two genera of ants, in the southwestern region, there is much overlap of food sources and space between Dorymyrmex bicolor and Myrmecocystus. The Myrmecocystus ants secrete a substance from their poison gland onto a food source they find in order to repel other ants. Dorymyrmex bicolor exhibits a different type of interference behavior. The workers of Dorymyrmex bicolor will surround the entrance to a nest of Myrmecocystus and will drop stones and other objects down the entrance, in an attempt to block the entrance. As many as 10-30 workers of Dorymyrmex bicolor have been observed to drop stones in an opposing nest, but only 5 workers are required to drop stones and other small objects at an efficient rate that will affect the Myrmecocystus nest. The number of Dorymyrmex bicolor workers in an area will have a reducing effect on the number of Myrmecocystus workers in an area, sometimes to drastic effects.

== Distribution ==
The known range of Dorymyrmex bicolor stretches from the Southwestern United States (California, Texas, Arizona, New Mexico, and Oklahoma), northern and southern Mexico (including Baja California), El Salvador, Guatemala, Belize, Peru, Honduras, and a few Caribbean island nations (i.e. Jamaica).

== Behavior ==
Dorymyrmex bicolor has a primarily foraging focused behavior, because of this they are known to influence rates of seed germination and distribution in plants. They move quickly and are active from early to late afternoon. They build crater-shaped nests made of fine sand, as they primarily live in desert-like areas though they can live in areas with higher humidity levels.
