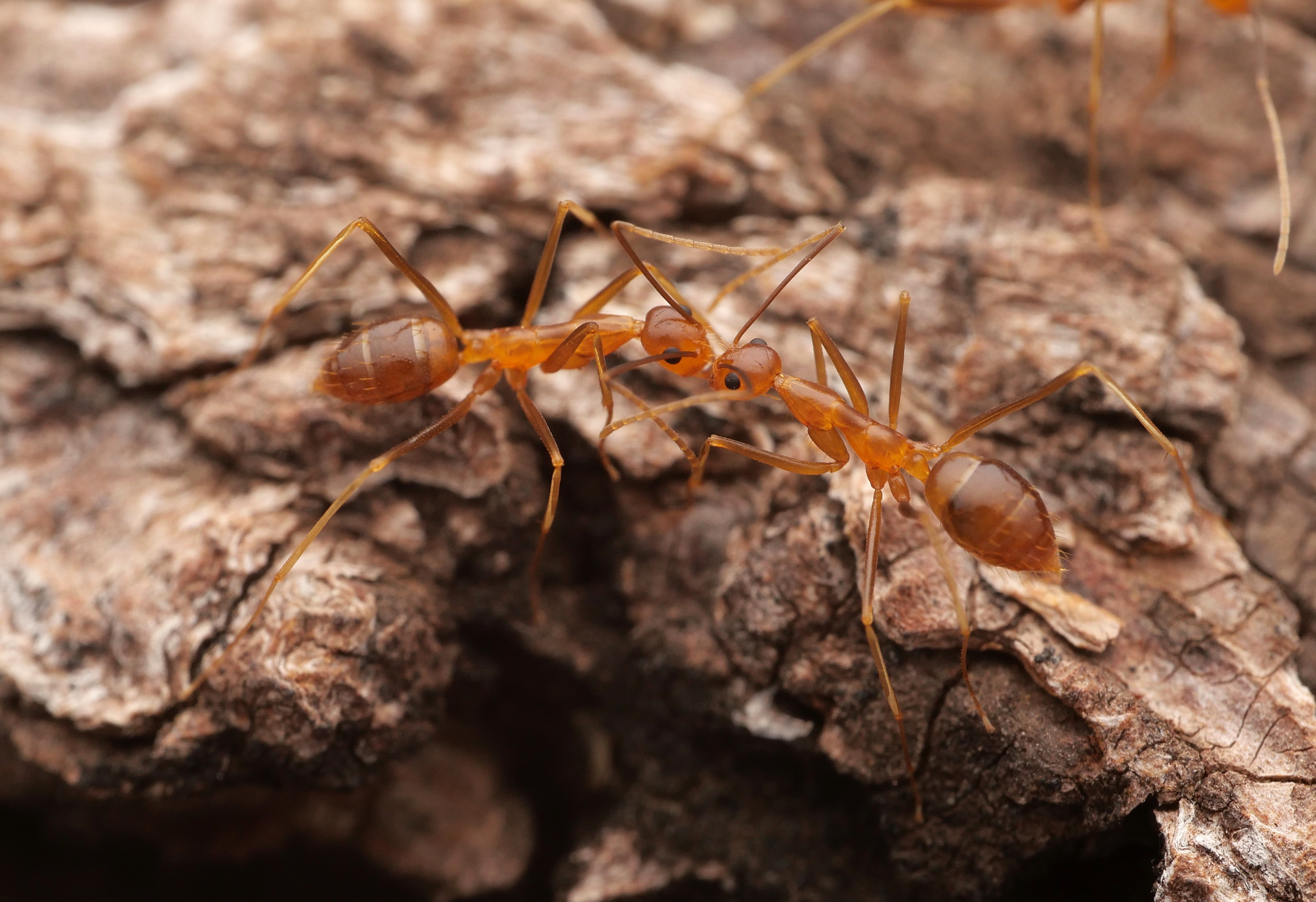
- Anoplolepis gracilipes

Scientific classification
- Domain: Eukaryota
- Kingdom: Animalia
- Phylum: Arthropoda
- Class: Insecta
- Order: Hymenoptera
- Family: Formicidae
- Subfamily: Formicinae
- Tribe: Plagiolepidini; Forel, 1886

Type genus
- Plagiolepis

Genera
- See text

= Plagiolepidini =

Tribe of ants

Plagiolepidini are an ant tribe from the subfamily Formicinae.

The following genera belong to this tribe:

- Acropyga Roger, 1862
- Agraulomyrmex Prins, 1983
- Anoplolepis Santschi, 1914
- Aphomomyrmex Emery, 1899
- Bregmatomyrma Wheeler, 1929
- Lepisiota Santschi, 1926
- Petalomyrmex Snelling, 1979
- Plagiolepis Mayr, 1861
- Tapinolepis Emery, 1925
