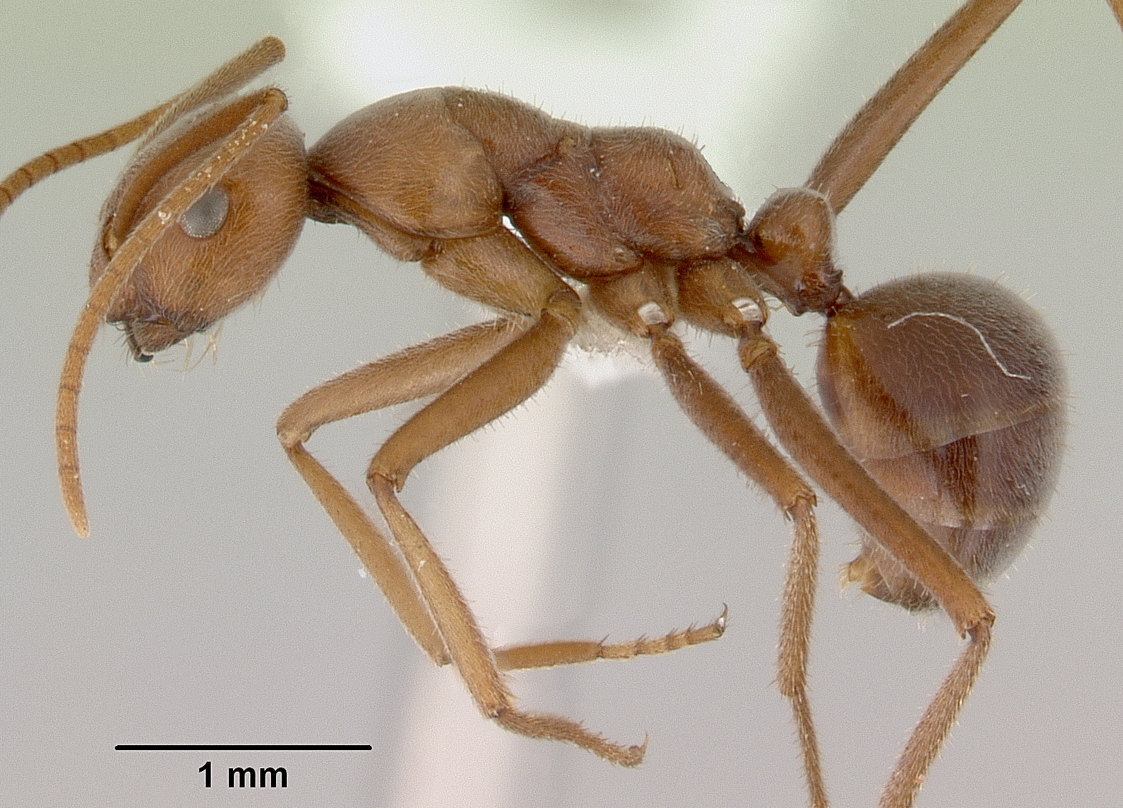
- Melophorus anderseni worker

Scientific classification
- Kingdom: Animalia
- Phylum: Arthropoda
- Class: Insecta
- Order: Hymenoptera
- Family: Formicidae
- Subfamily: Formicinae
- Tribe: Melophorini
- Genus: Melophorus; Lubbock, 1883

Type species
- Melophorus bagoti Lubbock, 1883

Diversity
- 23 species

Synonyms
- Erimelophorus Wheeler, 1935; Trichomelophorus Wheeler, 1935

= Melophorus =

Genus of ants

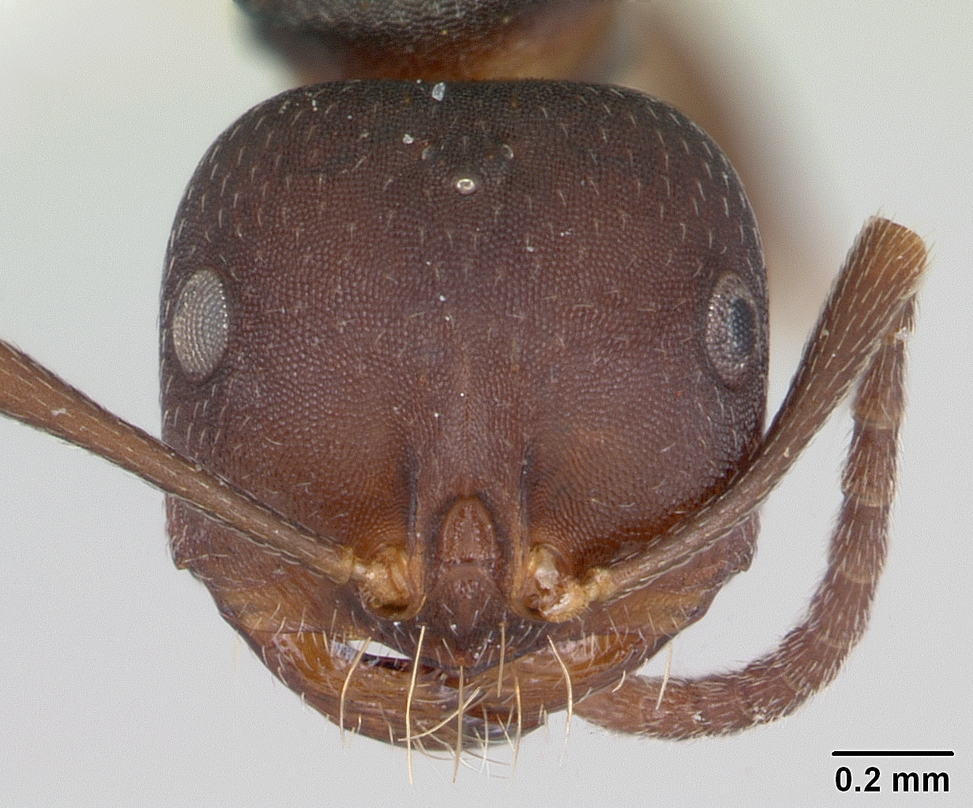
Head view of ant Melophorus majeri specimen

Melophorus (meaning "honey carrier") is a genus of ants in the subfamily Formicinae. The genus is endemic to Australia, where its species are common in arid and semiarid areas.

== Species ==
- Melophorus aeneovirens (Lowne, 1865)
- Melophorus anderseni Agosti, 1998
- Melophorus bagoti Lubbock, 1883
- Melophorus biroi Forel, 1907
- Melophorus bruneus McAreavey, 1949
- Melophorus constans Santschi, 1928
- Melophorus curtus Forel, 1902
- Melophorus fieldi Forel, 1910
- Melophorus fulvihirtus Clark, 1941
- Melophorus hirsutus Forel, 1902
- Melophorus insularis Wheeler, 1934
- Melophorus iridescens (Emery, 1887)
- Melophorus laticeps Wheeler, 1915
- Melophorus ludius Forel, 1902
- Melophorus majeri Agosti, 1998
- Melophorus marius Forel, 1910
- Melophorus mjobergi Forel, 1915
- Melophorus omniparens Forel, 1915
- Melophorus pillipes Santschi, 1919
- Melophorus potteri McAreavey, 1947
- Melophorus scipio Forel, 1915
- Melophorus turneri Forel, 1910
- Melophorus wheeleri Forel, 1910

== See also ==
- Honeypot ant
