= Leonardoxa =

Scientific classification
- Kingdom: Plantae
- Clade: Tracheophytes
- Clade: Angiosperms
- Clade: Eudicots
- Clade: Rosids
- Order: Fabales
- Family: Fabaceae
- Subfamily: Detarioideae
- Tribe: Amherstieae
- Genus: Leonardoxa; Aubrév.

Genus of legumes

Leonardoxa is a genus of flowering plants in the family Fabaceae. It belongs to the subfamily Detarioideae.

== Species ==
- Leonardoxa africana (Baill.) Aubrév.
- Leonardoxa romii (De Wild.) Aubrév.
