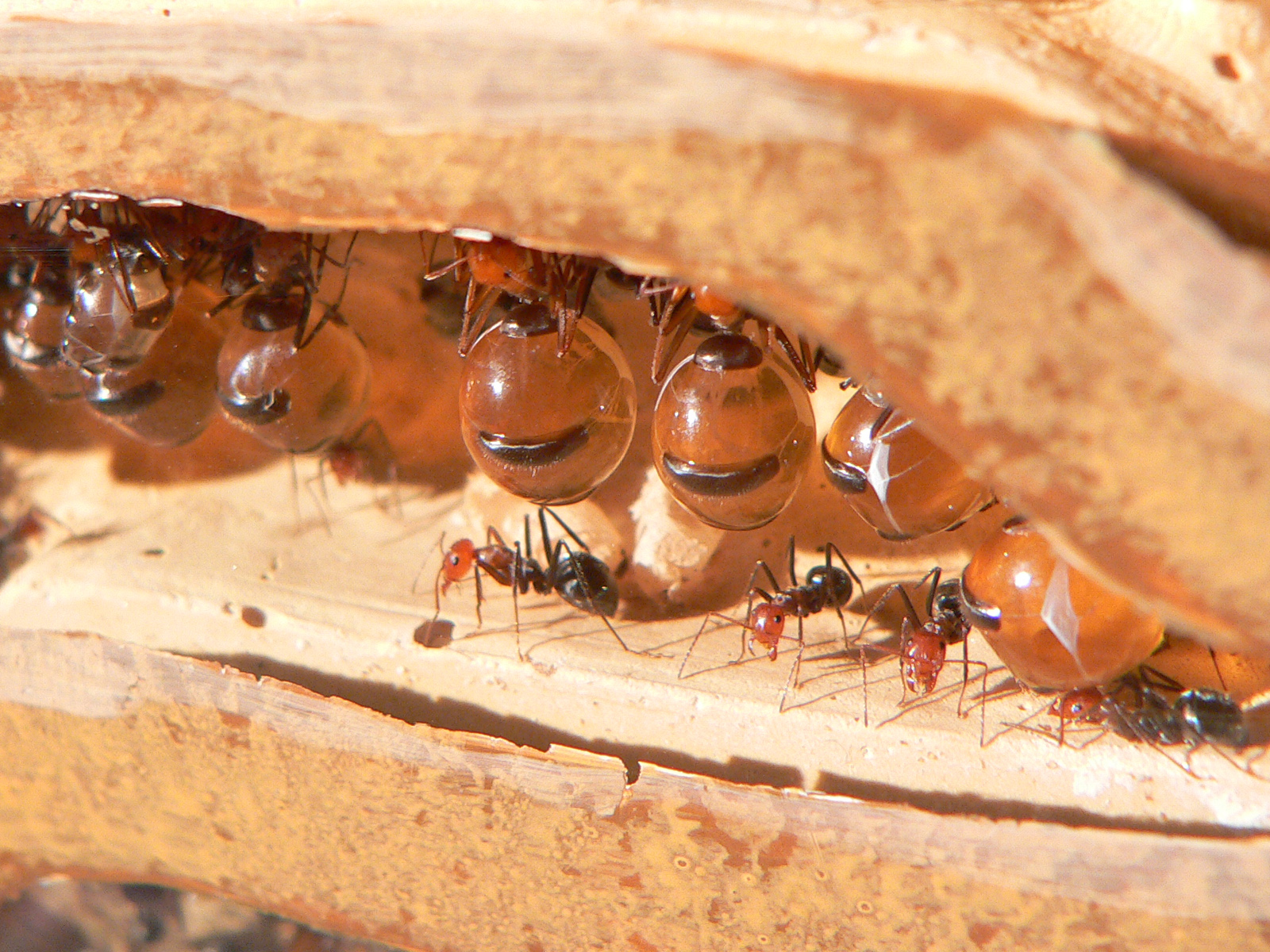
- Myrmecocystus (Endiodioctes) sp.

Scientific classification
- Kingdom: Animalia
- Phylum: Arthropoda
- Clade: Pancrustacea
- Class: Insecta
- Order: Hymenoptera
- Family: Formicidae
- Subfamily: Formicinae
- Tribe: Lasiini
- Genus: Myrmecocystus; Wesmael, 1838

Type species
- Myrmecocystus mexicanus Wesmael, 1838

Diversity
- 29 species

= Myrmecocystus =

Genus of ants

Myrmecocystus (Note: from Koine Greek μυρμήκιον (myrmécion) 'ant' and κύστις (cýstis) 'bladder, sac') is a North American genus of ants in the subfamily Formicinae. It is one of five genera that includes honeypot ants. Worker ants keep and tend plerergates, which are other ants that store large quantities of nutritious fluid in their abdomens to feed the colony during famine times. Some species engage in highly territorial tournaments, which can result in intraspecific slavery. During the raids, they carry off larvae, workers, and plerergates. The genus has three subgenera, namely Myrmecocystus, Endiodioctes, and Eremnocystus.

== Species ==
- Subgenus Myrmecosystus
  - Myrmecocystus christineae Snelling, 1982
  - Myrmecocystus ewarti Snelling, 1971
  - Myrmecocystus melanoticus Wheeler, 1914
  - Myrmecocystus mexicanus Wesmael, 1838
  - Myrmecocystus navajo Wheeler, 1908
  - Myrmecocystus pyramicus Smith, 1951
  - Myrmecocystus testaceus Emery, 1893
- Subgenus Endiodioctes
  - Myrmecocystus baja Sankey-Alamilla et al., 2024
  - Myrmecocystus depilis Forel, 1901
  - Myrmecocystus flaviceps Wheeler, 1912
  - Myrmecocystus intonsus Snelling, 1976
  - Myrmecocystus kathjuli Snelling, 1976
  - Myrmecocystus kennedyi Snelling, 1969
  - Myrmecocystus koso Snelling, 1976
  - Myrmecocystus melliger Forel, 1886
  - Myrmecocystus mendax Wheeler, 1908
  - Myrmecocystus mimicus Wheeler, 1908
  - Myrmecocystus nequazcatl Snelling, 1976
  - Myrmecocystus placodops Forel, 1908
  - Myrmecocystus romainei Hunt & Snelling, 1975
  - Myrmecocystus semirufus Emery, 1893
  - Myrmecocystus wheeleri Snelling, 1971
- Subgenus Eremnocystus
  - Myrmecocystus arenarius Snelling, 1982
  - Myrmecocystus colei Snelling, 1976
  - Myrmecocystus creightoni Snelling, 1971
  - Myrmecocystus hammettensis Cole, 1938
  - Myrmecocystus lugubris Wheeler, 1909
  - Myrmecocystus perimeces Snelling, 1976
  - Myrmecocystus snellingi Bolton, 1995
  - Myrmecocystus tenuinodis Snelling, 1976
  - Myrmecocystus yuma Wheeler, 1912

== Media ==
- Natural World: Empire of the Desert Ants, BBC TWO 10 August 2011, 8 pm BST; information about it on BBC Nature
