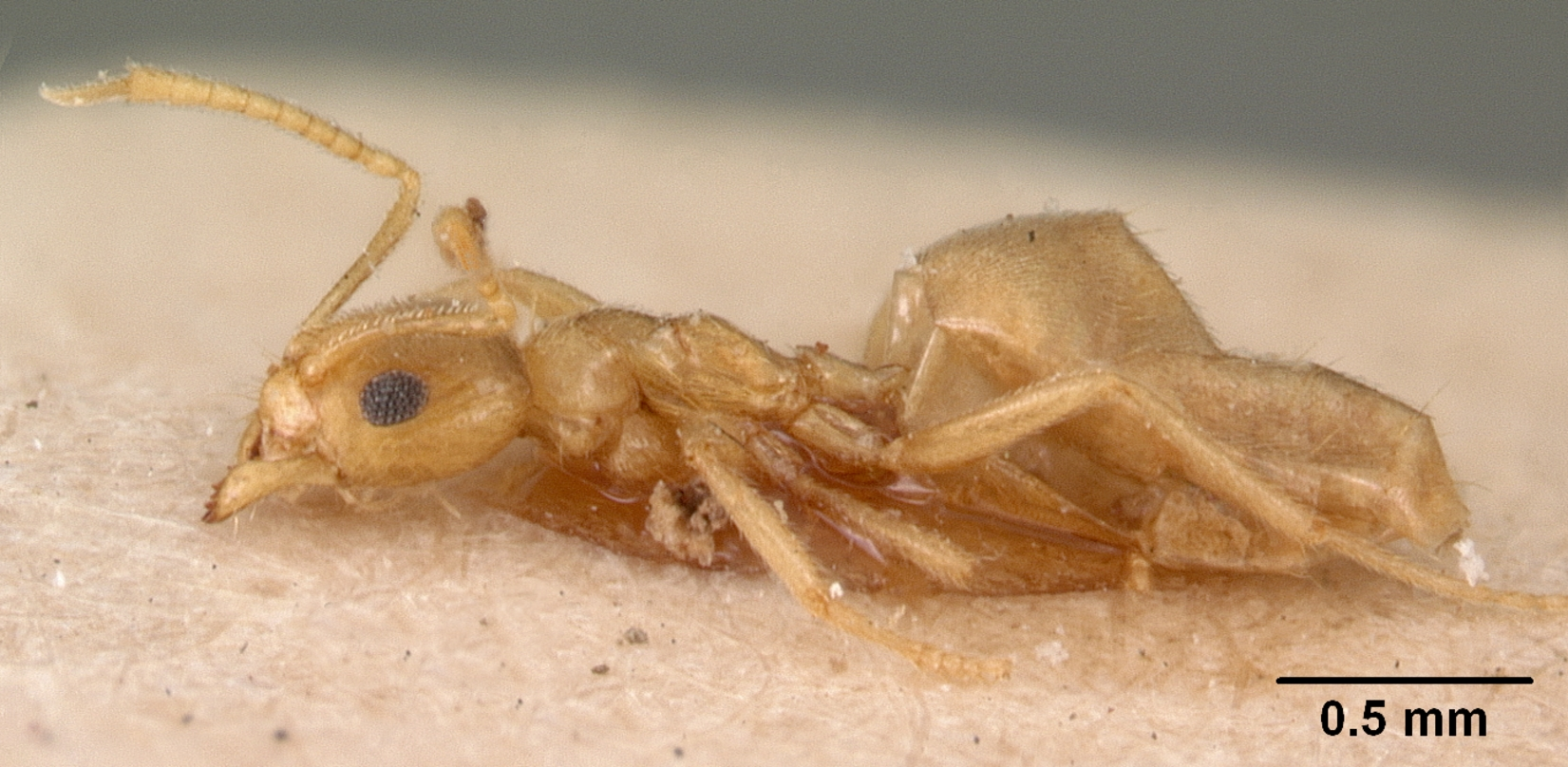
- Tapinolepis tumidula worker

Scientific classification
- Domain: Eukaryota
- Kingdom: Animalia
- Phylum: Arthropoda
- Class: Insecta
- Order: Hymenoptera
- Family: Formicidae
- Subfamily: Formicinae
- Tribe: Plagiolepidini
- Genus: Tapinolepis; Emery, 1925

Type species
- Plagiolepis tumidula

Diversity
- 14 species

Synonyms
- Mesanoplolepis Santschi, 1926

= Tapinolepis =

Genus of ants

Tapinolepis is a genus of ants in the subfamily Formicinae. The genus is known from the Afrotropical and Malagasy regions. Nothing is known about their biology.

== Species ==
- Tapinolepis bothae (Forel, 1907)
- Tapinolepis candida (Santschi, 1928)
- Tapinolepis deceptor (Arnold, 1922)
- Tapinolepis decolor (Emery, 1895)
- Tapinolepis litoralis (Arnold, 1958)
- Tapinolepis longitarsis (Collingwood & Agosti, 1996)
- Tapinolepis macgregori (Arnold, 1922)
- Tapinolepis macrophthalma (Arnold, 1962)
- Tapinolepis mediterranea (Mayr, 1866)
- Tapinolepis melanaria (Arnold, 1922)
- Tapinolepis pernix (Viehmeyer, 1923)
- Tapinolepis simulans (Santschi, 1908)
- Tapinolepis trimenii (Forel, 1895)
- Tapinolepis tumidula (Emery, 1915)
