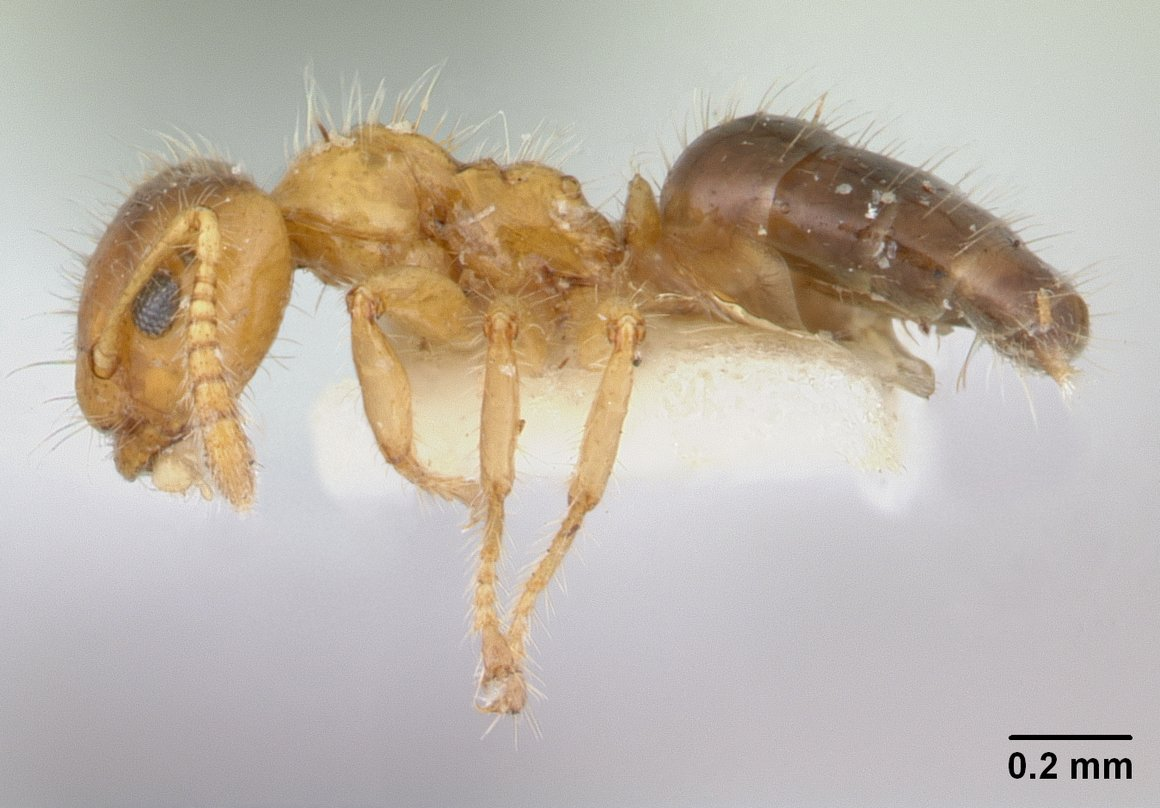

Scientific classification
- Kingdom: Animalia
- Phylum: Arthropoda
- Class: Insecta
- Order: Hymenoptera
- Family: Formicidae
- Subfamily: Formicinae
- Tribe: Plagiolepidini
- Genus: Petalomyrmex; Snelling, 1979
- Species: P. phylax

Binomial name
- Petalomyrmex phylax Snelling, 1979

= Petalomyrmex =

Genus of ants

Petalomyrmex (from Greek petalos, "flattened" + myrmex, "ant") is a genus of ants in the subfamily Formicinae. It contains the single species Petalomyrmex phylax, known only from Cameroon. The genus is closely related to Aphomomyrmex.
