= Hexanone =

Hexanone may refer to the following ketones containing six carbon atoms:

- 2-Hexanone (Methyl butyl ketone, MBK)
  - 4-Methyl-2-pentanone (Methyl isobutyl ketone, MIBK)
  - 3-Methyl-2-pentanone (Methyl sec-butyl ketone)
  - 3,3-Dimethyl-2-butanone (Methyl tert-butyl ketone, Pinacolone)
- 3-Hexanone (Ethyl propyl ketone)
  - 2-Methyl-3-pentanone (Ethyl isopropyl ketone)

== See also ==
- Cyclohexanone
