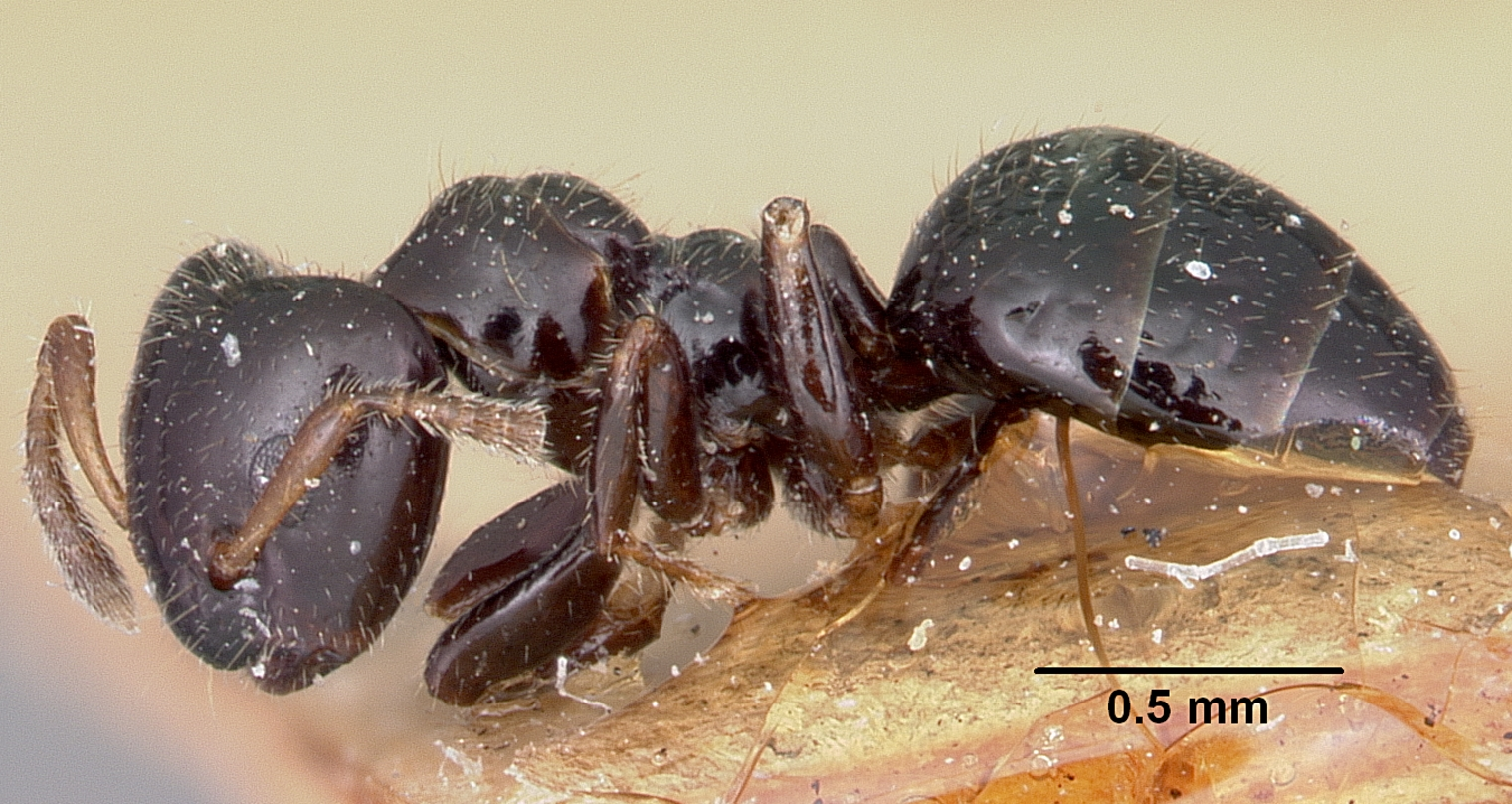
- Aphonomyrmex afer worker from South Africa

Scientific classification
- Domain: Eukaryota
- Kingdom: Animalia
- Phylum: Arthropoda
- Class: Insecta
- Order: Hymenoptera
- Family: Formicidae
- Subfamily: Formicinae
- Tribe: Plagiolepidini
- Genus: Aphomomyrmex; Emery, 1899
- Species: A. afer

Binomial name
- Aphomomyrmex afer Emery, 1899

= Aphomomyrmex =

Genus of ants

Aphomomyrmex is a genus of ants in the subfamily Formicinae. It contains the single species Aphomomyrmex afer, known from Africa (Cameroon and South Africa). The genus is closely related to Petalomyrmex.
