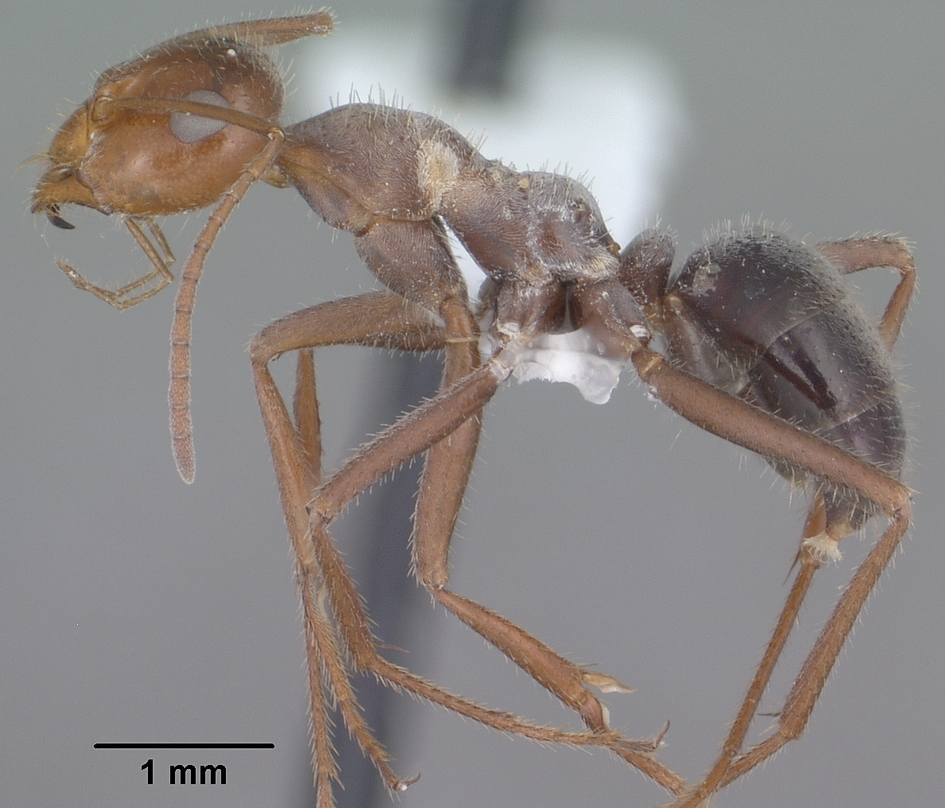
- Myrmecocystus mimicus worker

Scientific classification
- Domain: Eukaryota
- Kingdom: Animalia
- Phylum: Arthropoda
- Class: Insecta
- Order: Hymenoptera
- Family: Formicidae
- Subfamily: Formicinae
- Genus: Myrmecocystus
- Subgenus: Endiodioctes
- Species: M. mimicus

Binomial name
- Myrmecocystus mimicus Wheeler, 1908

= Myrmecocystus mimicus =

Species of ant

Myrmecocystus mimicus is a North American species of ant in the genus Myrmecocystus. The species is widely distributed, from Kansas south to Texas and Mexico, and west to California.
