= Honeypot ant =

Ants that store food in living workers

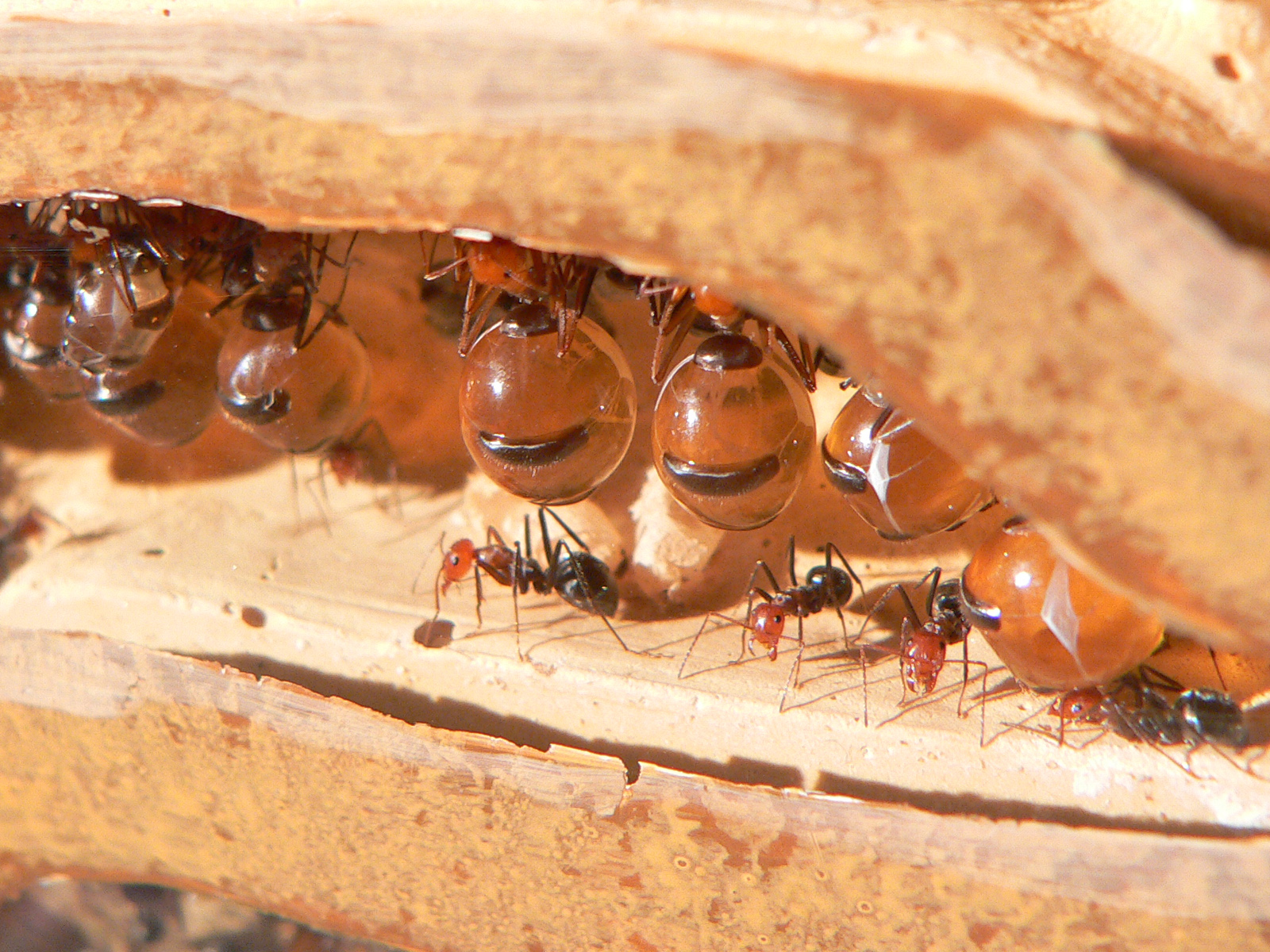
Myrmecocystus honeypot ants, showing the repletes or plerergates, their abdomens swollen to store honey, above ordinary workers

Honeypot ants, also called honey ants, are ants which have specialized workers—repletes, plerergates or rotunds—that consume large amounts of food to the point that their abdomens swell enormously. This phenomenon of extreme inflation of the trunk is called physogastry. Other ants then extract nourishment from them, through the process of trophallaxis. They function as living larders. Honeypot ants belong to any of several genera, including Myrmecocystus and Camponotus. They were first documented in 1881 by Henry C. McCook, and described further in 1908 by William Morton Wheeler.

== Behaviour ==
Many insects, notably honey bees and some wasps, collect and store liquid for use at a later date. However, these insects store their food within their nest or in combs. Honey ants are unique in using their own bodies as living storage, used later by their fellow ants when food is otherwise scarce. Designated worker ants, called "repletes," are the main group that store food for the colony. Repletes are fed by other worker ants until their abdomens become swollen with honey. This extreme growth causes the repletes to become mostly immobile as they act as the "living pantry" for the colony. When the liquid stored inside a honeypot ant is needed, the worker ants stroke the antennae of the honeypot ant, causing the honeypot ant to regurgitate the stored liquid from its crop.

== Anatomy ==
replete in ventral view

replete in dorsal view

The abdomen of species like Camponotus inflatus consists of hard dorsal sclerites (stiff plates) connected by a softer, more flexible arthrodial membrane. When the abdomen is empty, the arthrodial membrane is folded and the sclerites overlap, but when the abdomen fills the arthrodial membrane becomes fully stretched, leaving the sclerites widely separated. Unlike ordinary workers, in which the arthrodial membrane is rarely stretched to its limit, repletes repeatedly cycle between a tightly folded, overlapping configuration and an extreme, fully extended state as they are filled and drained.

== Honey ==
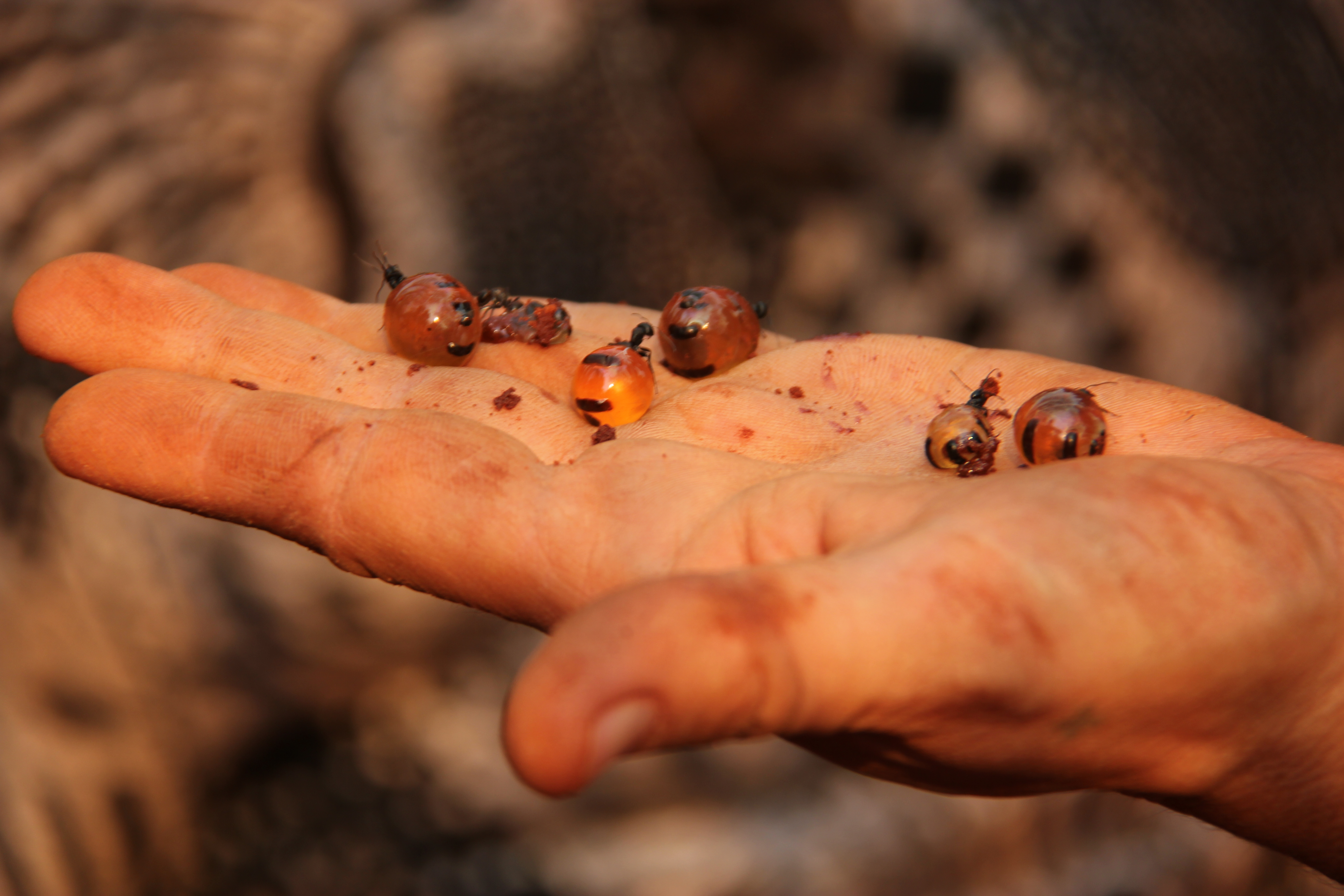
Honeypot ants compared to a human hand. The dark dorsal sclerites are widely separated by the stretched arthrodial membrane of the inflated abdomen of each replete.

The honey from honeypot ants is unique. Like bee honey, it has antimicrobial effects against pathogens and decay organisms, but it differs from bee honey, for example in having a higher moisture content. Honeypot honey has a significantly lower concentration of sugar than bee honey from manuka and jarrah for example. The ant honey is not concentrated only from nectar and other sweet components of the diet, but also from metabolites of plant and animal food sources in general. The honey has a slightly acidic pH, and contains phenolic compounds. It also contains a disaccharide of unknown function, that still was unidentified in 2023.

== Ecology ==
Myrmecocystus nests are found in a variety of arid or semiarid environments. Some species live in extremely hot deserts, others reside in transitional habitats, and still other species can be found in woodlands which are somewhat cool but still very dry for a large part of the year. Honeypot ants have been reported to be in the USA (specifically Colorado and New Mexico), Mexico, the African continent, and Australia. For instance, the well-studied Myrmecocystus mexicanus resides in the arid and semiarid habitats of the southwestern United States. Sterile workers in this species act as plerergates or repletes during times of food scarcity. When the plerergates are fully engorged, they become immobile and hang from the ceilings of the underground nests. Other workers drain them of their liquid food stores to feed the rest of the colony. Plerergates can live anywhere in the nest, but in the wild, they are found deep underground, unable to move, swollen to the size of grapes.

In Camponotus inflatus in Australia, repletes formed 49% (516 ants) of a colony of 1063 ants, and 46% (1835 ants) of a colony of 4019 ants. The smaller colony contained six wingless queens. The larger colony had 66 chambers containing repletes, with a maximum of 191 repletes in a chamber. The largest replete was 15 millimetres long and had a mass of 1.4 grams. The nest had a maximum depth of 1.7 metres, and tunnels stretched 2.4 metres from the nest entrance. The workers went out foraging during daylight to collect nectar from Mulga nectaries, and meat from the carcass of a Tiliqua blue-tongued lizard.

== Recent findings ==
Bee honey is an effective natural remedy for a wide range of ailments. But very little research has been done on other types of honey, produced by different insects, up until recently. The antimicrobial activity of honey from honeypot ants was tested and compared to the antimicrobial activity of bee honey. It was found that honeypot ant honey has activity against bacteria, yeast, and mold. When honeypot ant honey was compared against jarrah or manuka bee honeys, a distinctly different activity profile was found. Honeypot ant honey outperformed the other two honeys against some pathogens, but exhibited low/no activity against other ones.

== General ==
Honeypot food storage has been adopted in several seasonally active ant genera:

- Camponotus of Australia
- Cataglyphis of North Africa
- Leptomyrmex of Melanesia
- Melophorus of Australia
- Myrmecocystus of North America.
- Anoplolepis and Tapinolepis of South Africa
- Prenolepis of North America
- Brachymyrmex of South America, such as Brachymyrmex Giardii.

== Cultural significance ==
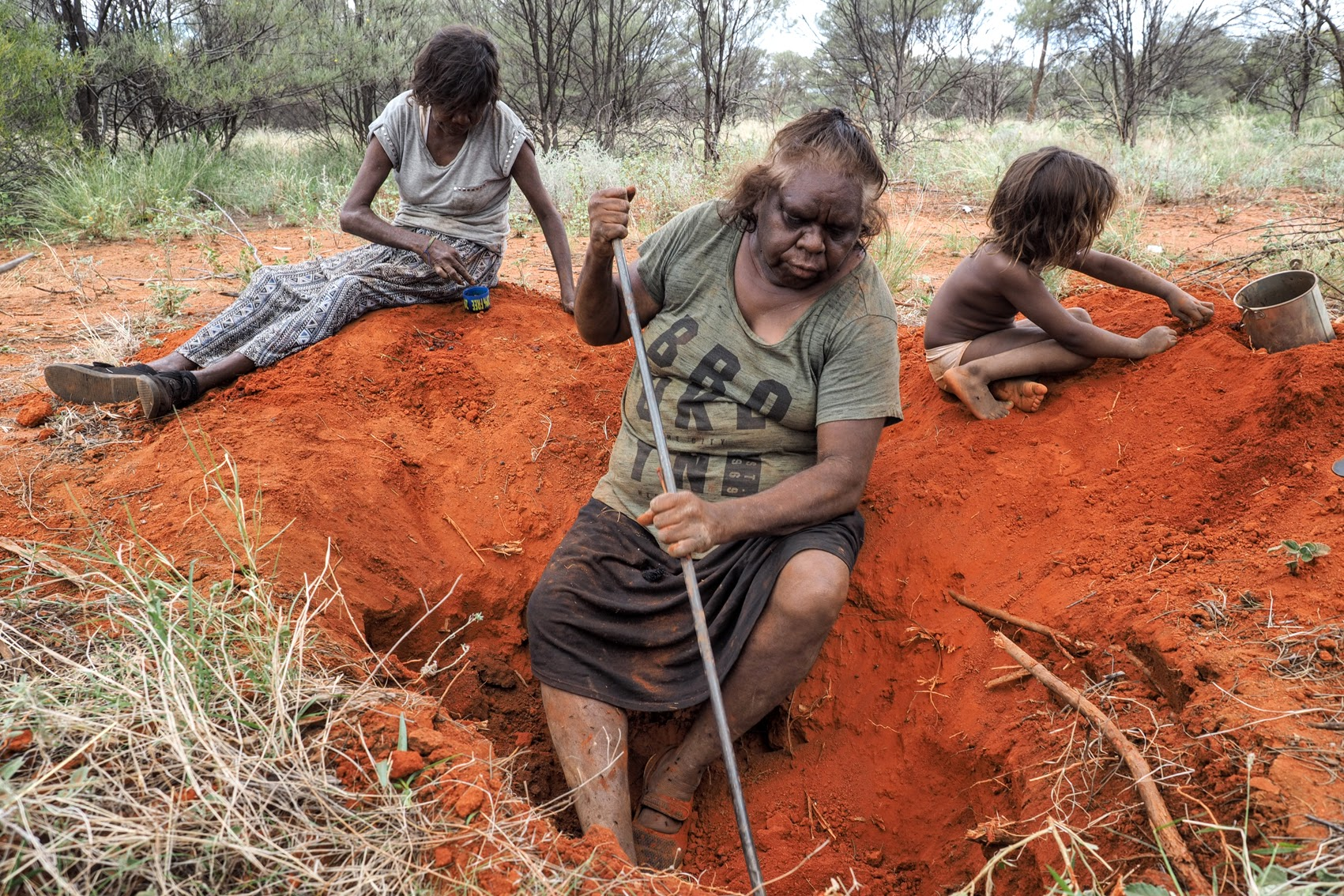
Digging for honey ants

Honeypot ants such as Melophorus bagoti and Camponotus are edible insects and form an occasional part of the diet of various Indigenous Australians. These people scrape the surface to locate the ants' vertical tunnels, and then dig as much as two metres deep to find the honeypots. Papunya, in Australia's Northern Territory, is named after a honey ant creation story, or Dreaming, which belongs to the people there, such as the Warlpiri. The honey ants were celebrated in the Western Desert Art Movement's The Honey Ant Mural, painted in 1971. In Central Australia, there is a Honey Ant Dreaming site that is shared by all indigenous groups around the area. For these indigenous groups, the honey pot ant represents their Dreaming or Tjukurpa, the philosophy based on the spiritual connection between people and things.

Honeypot ants are an important part of the culture for Australian Aboriginal people. A Tjupan legend says that mothers who sit and gather honey ants for long periods of time, will start to neglect their children, leaving her and her children vulnerable to enemies who want to slay. This story has been passed down from many generations to remind women to be aware of their surroundings when sitting and gathering.

For numerous indigenous groups, collecting honey ants is viewed as a women's job. Digging for ants is viewed as a social gathering for women to converse and interact. Children are often included so they learn the cultural and location-specific knowledge in locating the underground ant colonies.

=== Indigenous medicinal use ===
Indigenous Australians from the Tjupan language group use honeypot ant honey to treat sore throats, colds, and as a topical ointment to treat skin infections. A Sydney University study has investigated the efficacy of honey from Camponotus inflatus, and found it effective against the bacterium Staphylococcus aureus, and the fungi Aspergillus and Cryptococcus. The antimicrobial mechanism is significantly different to that of Mānuka honey.

== See also ==
- Ant § Polymorphism – Family of insects
- Mermithergate
