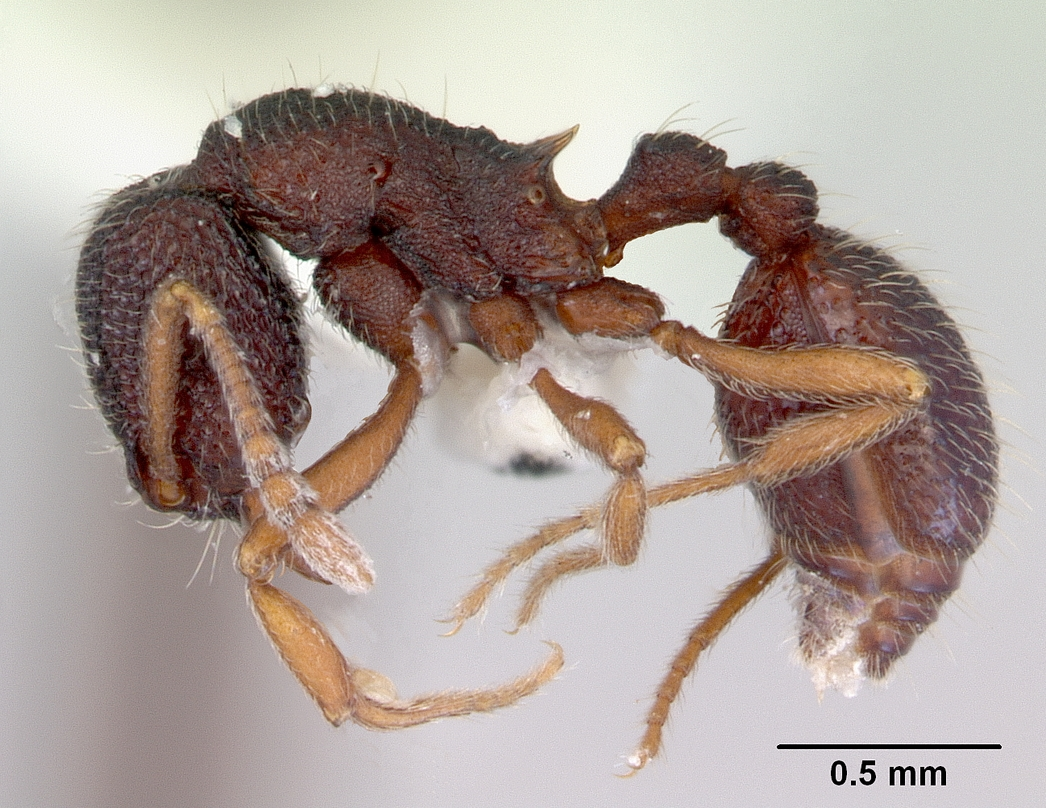
- Indomyrma dasypyx worker from India

Scientific classification
- Domain: Eukaryota
- Kingdom: Animalia
- Phylum: Arthropoda
- Class: Insecta
- Order: Hymenoptera
- Family: Formicidae
- Subfamily: Myrmicinae
- Genus: Indomyrma
- Species: I. dasypyx

Binomial name
- Indomyrma dasypyx Brown, 1986

= Indomyrma dasypyx =

Species of ant

Indomyrma dasypyx is a species of ant that belongs to the genus Indomyrma. It was the only known species of Indomyrma until Indomyrma bellae was described in 2012.

Brown described the species in 1986. They are native to India.
