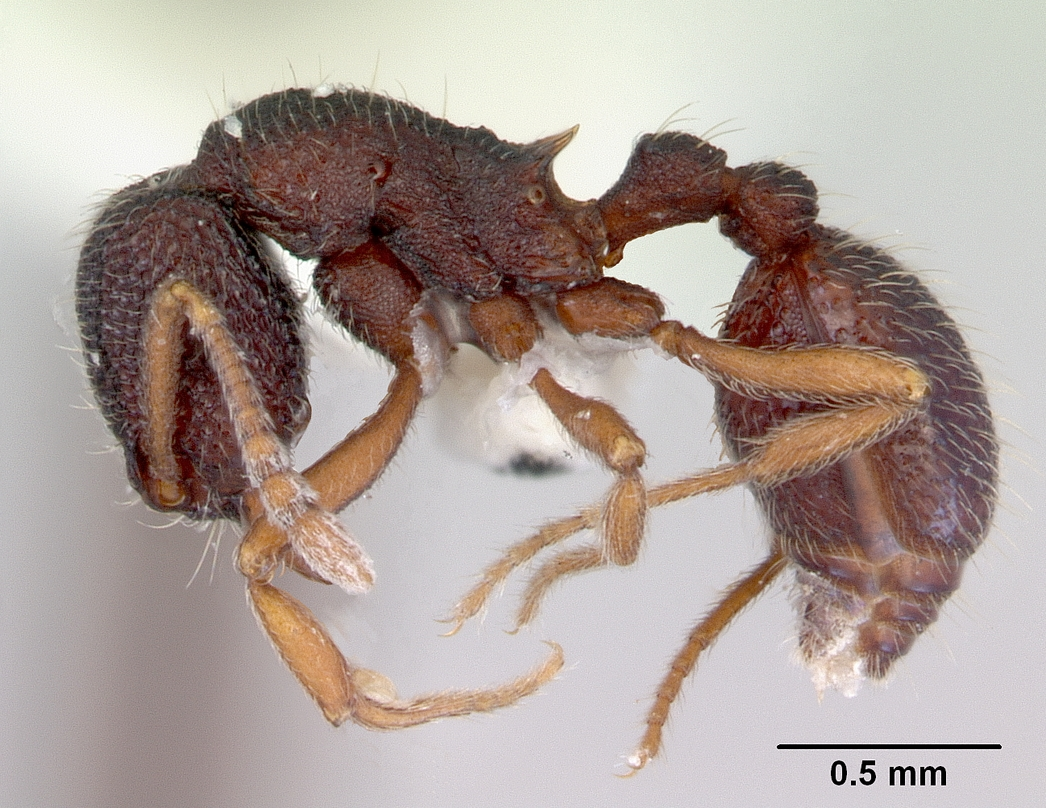
- Indomyrma dasypyx worker from India

Scientific classification
- Domain: Eukaryota
- Kingdom: Animalia
- Phylum: Arthropoda
- Class: Insecta
- Order: Hymenoptera
- Family: Formicidae
- Subfamily: Myrmicinae
- Tribe: Crematogastrini
- Genus: Indomyrma; Brown, 1986

Type species
- Indomyrma dasypyx

Diversity
- 2 species

= Indomyrma =

Genus of ants

Indomyrma is an Asian genus of ants in the subfamily Myrmicinae. The genus contains two species: the type species Indomyrma dasypyx known from India and Indomyrma bellae known from Vietnam.

== Species ==
- Indomyrma bellae Zryanin, 2012
- Indomyrma dasypyx Brown, 1986
