= Indomyrma bellae =

Scientific classification
- Kingdom: Animalia
- Phylum: Arthropoda
- Clade: Pancrustacea
- Class: Insecta
- Order: Hymenoptera
- Family: Formicidae
- Subfamily: Myrmicinae
- Genus: Indomyrma
- Species: I. bellae

Binomial name
- Indomyrma bellae Zryanin, 2012

Species of ant

Indomyrma bellae is a species of ant that belongs to the genus Indomyrma. The species has been observed in Vietnam. It is also a recently discovered species, which was described by Zryanin in 2012.
