= List of ant subfamilies =

Clades
- stem ants
  - †Armaniinae
  - †Sphecomyrminae
- poneroids
  - Agroecomyrmecinae
  - Amblyoponinae
  - Apomyrminae
  - †Brownimeciinae
  - Paraponerinae
  - Ponerinae
  - Proceratiinae
- formicoids
  - dorylomorphs
    - Dorylinae
  - myrmeciomorphs
    - Myrmeciinae
    - Pseudomyrmecinae
  - dolichoderomorphs
    - Aneuretinae
    - Dolichoderinae
  - ectaheteromorphs
    - Ectatomminae
    - Heteroponerinae
  - †Formiciinae
  - Formicinae
  - Myrmicinae
- Leptanillinae
- Martialinae
Extinct taxa are indicated by a †
Source: Ward (2007),
Kück et al. (2011),
Brady et al. (2014)

Ants (family Formicidae in the order Hymenoptera) are the most species-rich of all social insects, with more than 12,000 described species and many others awaiting description. Formicidae is divided into 21 subfamilies, of which 17 contain extant taxa, while four are exclusively fossil. Ants have come to occupy virtually all major terrestrial habitats, with the exception of tundra and cold ever-wet forests. They display a wide range of social behaviors, foraging habits and associations with other organisms, which has generated scientific and public interest.

== Clades ==
Beginning in the 1990s, molecular (DNA sequence) data have come to play a central role in attempts to reconstruct the ant "tree of life". Molecular phylogenetic analyses based on multiple nuclear genes have yielded robust results that reinforce some preexisting views but overturn others – and suggest that there has been considerable morphological convergence among some ant lineages. Molecular data provide very strong support for a novel group, the "formicoid clade", not revealed by previous morphological work. This clade comprises 9 of the 16 extant ant subfamilies and about 90% of all described ant species. Formicoids include such widespread and species-rich subfamilies as Myrmicinae, Formicinae and Dolichoderinae, as well as the army ants (Dorylinae). Non-formicoids comprise five "poneroid" subfamilies (Agroecomyrmecinae, Amblyoponinae, Paraponerinae, Ponerinae, and Proceratiinae), Leptanillinae, about which little is known, and Martialinae, the most recently discovered subfamily. Relationships among these remaining seven subfamilies are less well resolved. A recent study (2011) places Leptanillinae as a sister group to all other ants, with Martialinae, the poneroids and formicoids forming a clade.

== Evolution of ants ==
Ants first arose during the mid-Cretaceous, more than 100 million years ago, associated with the rise of flowering plants and an increase in forest ground litter. The earliest known ants evolved from a lineage within the aculeate wasps, and a recent study suggests that they are a sister group of Apoidea. During the Cretaceous ants were confined to the northern Laurasian supercontinent, with only a few widespread primitive species. By the middle Eocene, around 50 million years ago, ants had diversified and become ecologically dominant as predators and scavengers. Ant species are less than 2% of the total number of insect species but make up one third of the insect biomass.

== History of classification ==
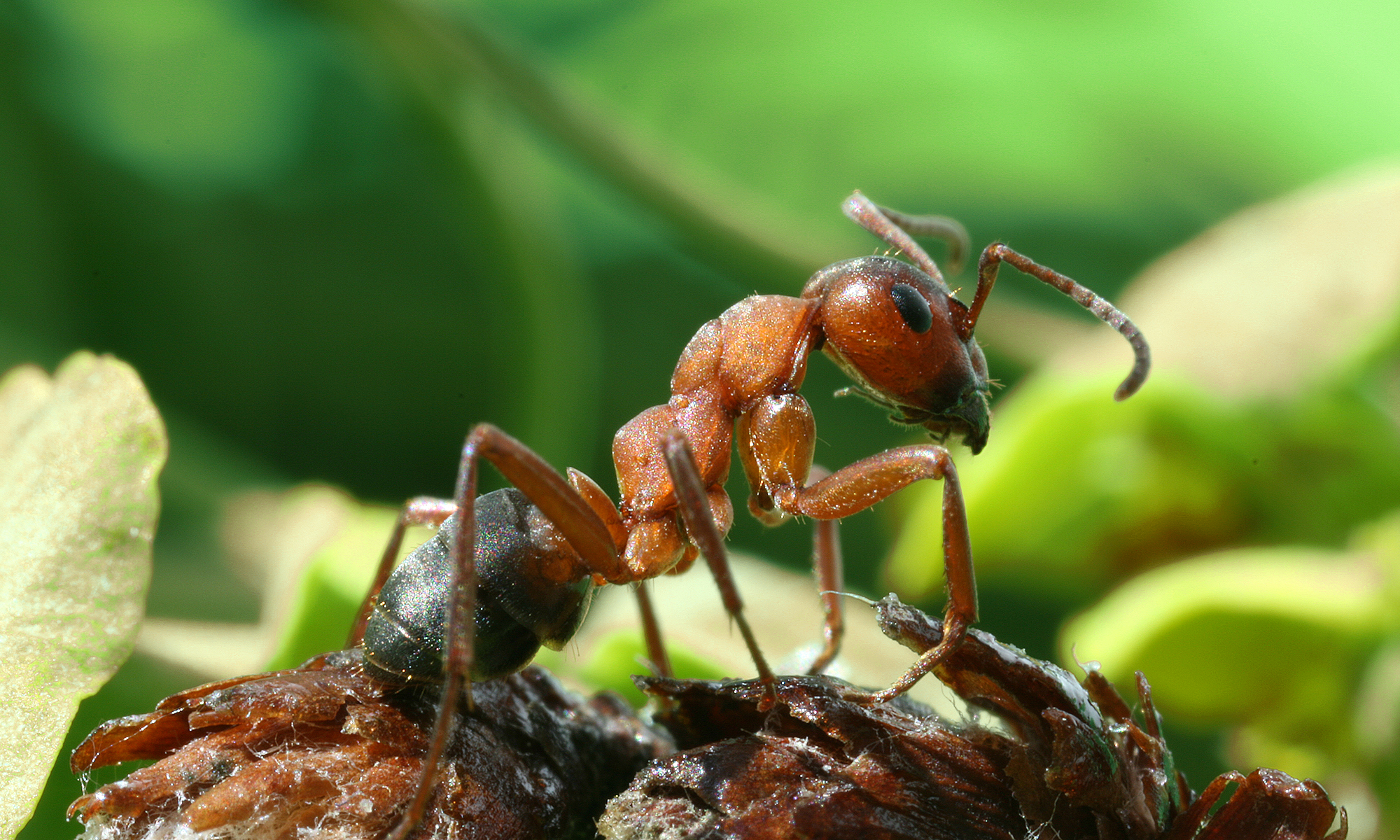
Formica rufa, one of the seventeen species of ants described by Linnaeus (1758) in his Systema Naturae

In volume 1 of Systema Naturae, Carl Linnaeus (1758) described seventeen species of ants, all of which he placed in the single genus Formica. Within a few decades additional genera had been recognized, and this trend continued in the ensuing years, together with the development of a more complex hierarchical classification in which genera were apportioned among subfamilies and tribes. The ant species described by Linnaeus are now dispersed in eleven different genera, belonging to four subfamilies.

For much of the twentieth century the number of recognized ant subfamilies varied from seven to ten, with the Aneuretinae, Cerapachyinae, Leptanillinae, Myrmeciinae and Pseudomyrmecinae being variously treated as separate subfamilies or (at different times) subsumed within Dolichoderinae, Ponerinae, Dorylinae, Ponerinae, and Myrmicinae, respectively. In 2014, Brady et al. synonymized the army ant subfamilies and their closest relatives under Dorylinae; this clade, the dorylomorph subfamilies, previously also contained Aenictinae, Aenictogitoninae, Cerapachyinae, Ecitoninae and Leptanilloidinae.

The last three decades have seen a proliferation of subfamily names, as a result of three factors: (1) the realization that some subfamilies were assemblages of unrelated taxa; (2) abandonment of paraphyletic taxa, and (3) the discovery of novel fossil taxa. Seventeen extant subfamilies of ants are currently recognized, along with four extinct subfamilies. One of the fossil taxa, Armaniinae, is often given family rank within the superfamily Formicoidea. About 13 genera are incertae sedis (of uncertain placement), and are not assigned to any subfamily.

== Subfamilies ==
Extinct taxa are indicated by a †.

Formicidae
Subfamily	Extant genera	Fossil genera	Type genus	Comments	Example
Agroecomyrmecinae; Carpenter, 1930	2	2	†Agroecomyrmex; Wheeler, 1910	Agroecomyrmecines were probably widespread in both hemispheres during the early Tertiary, but are today represented by only two species in two genera, Tatuidris and Ankylomyrma. The two fossil genera, Agroecomyrmex and Eulithomyrmex, are known from Eocene fossils.	Tatuidris tatusia
Amblyoponinae; Forel, 1893	13	1	Amblyopone; Erichson, 1842	Specialized predators found worldwide, but mainly distributed in the tropics.	Apomyrma stygia
Aneuretinae; Emery, 1913	1	8	Aneuretus; Emery, 1893	In addition to 8 fossil genera, the subfamily is represented by one extant genus, Aneuretus. The living genus has a single species, the Sri Lankan relict ant (Aneuretus simoni), endemic to Sri Lanka and only found in a few locations. The species is listed as critically endangered by the IUCN.	Aneuretus simoni
Apomyrminae; Dlussky & Fedoseeva, 1988	1	1	Apomyrma; Brown, Gotwald & Lévieux, 1970	Contains a single described species, the rare subterranean ant Apomyrma stygia, and several undescribed species, all known from the Afrotropics.	Apomyrma stygia
†Armaniinae; Dlussky, 1983	0	8	†Armania; Dlussky, 1983	Known from Cretaceous fossils, this subfamily is sometimes treated as the family Armaniidae within the superfamily Formicoidea. They seem to lack a metapleural gland, which would exclude them from Formicidae given an apomorphy-based definition requiring such a gland to have evolved. However, the apparent lack of this gland in Armaniinae fossils could be due to poorer preservation.	Orapia rayneri
†Brownimeciinae; Bolton, 2003	0	1	†Brownimecia; Grimaldi, Agosti & Carpenter, 1997	Contains the single species Brownimecia clavata, a fossil ant known from New Jersey amber. Initially placed within Ponerinae, this primitive Cretaceous ant was later moved to its own subfamily.	Brownimecia clavata
Dolichoderinae; Forel, 1878	28	20	Dolichoderus; Lund, 1831	A diverse subfamily distributed worldwide, mainly in the tropics. Most species are generalized scavengers, but some are predacious. They lack a sting and instead rely on chemical defensive compounds produced from the anal gland.	Dolichoderus mariae
Dorylinae; Leach, 1815	28	1 (Note: The fossil genus †Curticorna was placed in Dorylinae by Hong (2002), but this genus is "definitely not Dorylinae" according to Barry Bolton. Dlussky & Wedmann (2012) suggest that †Curticorna may belong to Ectatomminae. It is listed as incertae sedis within Formicidae in this list.) (Note: The fossil genus †Eoaenictites was placed in Aenictinae (now Dorylinae) by Hong (2002), but this genus is "definitely not Aenictinae" according to Barry Bolton. It is listed as incertae sedis within Formicidae in this list.)	Dorylus; Fabricius, 1793	Contains the previous dorylomorph subfamilies (Aenictinae, Aenictogitoninae, Cerapachyinae, Ecitoninae and Leptanilloidinae), including the Old World and New World army ants.	Dorylus helvolus
Ectatomminae; Emery, 1895	4	3	Ectatomma; Smith, 1858	Found in tropical and warm climates in the New World, Old World and Indo-Australian regions.	Ectatomma ruidum
†Formiciinae; Lutz, 1986	0	1 (Note: The subfamily also contains the collective group name †Formicium.)	†Formicium (Note: The type genus of the subfamily, †Formicium, was previously treated as a nominal genus, but was later reclassified as a collective group name by Archibald et al. (2011). However, according to the International Code of Zoological Nomenclature (ICZN Code), the genus remains the type genus of Formiciinae.); Westwood, 1854	Known from Eocene fossils found in Europe and North America, this subfamily contains the genus Titanomyrma and the collective group name Formicium.	Titanomyrma giganteum
Formicinae; Latreille, 1809	51	30	Formica; Linnaeus, 1758	Worldwide in distribution, Formicinae is the second largest subfamily; only Myrmicinae is larger.	Formica rufa
Heteroponerinae; Bolton, 2003	3	0	Heteroponera; Mayr, 1887	Contains the two Neotropical genera, Acanthoponera and Heteroponera, and the genus Aulacopone, which is known from the single species, Aulacopone relicta, from Azerbaijan.	Heteroponera brounii
Leptanillinae; Emery, 1910	8	0	Leptanilla; Emery, 1870	Small subterranean ants known from Africa, Europe, Asia and a single species from Australia; no species are known from North or South America. Little is known about the biology of these ants.	Leptanilla swani
Martialinae; Rabeling & Verhaagh, 2008	1	0	Martialis; Rabeling & Verhaagh, 2008	The subfamily is only known from a single specimen of the species Martialis heureka, collected in 2003 in the Amazon rainforest. Workers are pale and blind; queens and males are unknown.	Martialis heureka
Myrmeciinae; Emery, 1877	2	5 (Note: The subfamily also contains the collective group name †Myrmeciites.)	Myrmecia; Fabricius, 1804	A formerly widespread subfamily, now only found in the Australasian region distributed in two extant genera. The genus Myrmecia, or "bulldog ants", is known from Australia, New Zealand and New Caledonia, and Nothomyrmecia, with the single species Nothomyrmecia macrops, is known from Australia.	Myrmecia gulosa
Myrmicinae; Lepeletier de Saint-Fargeau, 1835	140	35	Myrmica; Latreille, 1804	The largest subfamily of ants, distributed worldwide. Contains the seed-harvesting ants and fungus-growing ants.	Myrmica lonae
Paraponerinae; Emery, 1901	1	0	Paraponera; Smith, 1858	Contains the single genus Paraponera consisting of two species: the extant Paraponera clavata, also known as a bullet ant, found in the Neotropics, and the very small fossil species Paraponera dieteri known from Dominican amber (Early Miocene).	Paraponera clavata
Ponerinae; Lepeletier de Saint-Fargeau, 1835	47	12	Ponera; Latreille, 1804	Predominantly predacious ants distributed in the tropics and subtropics. The subfamily formerly contained all the poneromorph subfamilies (at the time classified as tribes), which have now been divided into six subfamilies: Amblyoponinae, Ectatomminae, Heteroponerinae, Paraponerinae, Ponerinae and Proceratiinae.	Ponera coarctata
Proceratiinae; Emery, 1895	3	1	Proceratium; Roger, 1863	Ants in this subfamily are small to medium in size. Found worldwide, although mainly tropical and subtropical in distribution. Little is known about their biology, but they are thought to be specialized predators.	Proceratium google
Pseudomyrmecinae; Smith, 1952	3	0	Pseudomyrmex; Lund, 1831	A small subfamily consisting of three genera of predominantly arboreal ants found in tropical and subtropical regions. The ants, agile and with large eyes, are characterized by their slender bodies.	Pseudomyrmex pallidus
†Sphecomyrminae; Wilson & Brown, 1967	0	9	†Sphecomyrma; Wilson & Brown, 1967	Fossil subfamily of stem ants. Most Cretaceous ants are placed in this subfamily.	Sphecomyrma freyi

== See also ==
- List of ant genera
- Poneromorph subfamilies
