= Lithomyrmex =

Lithomyrmex can refer to:

- Lithomyrmex Clark, 1928, junior synonym of Stigmatomma
- Lithomyrmex Carpenter, 1930, junior synonym of Eulithomyrmex
