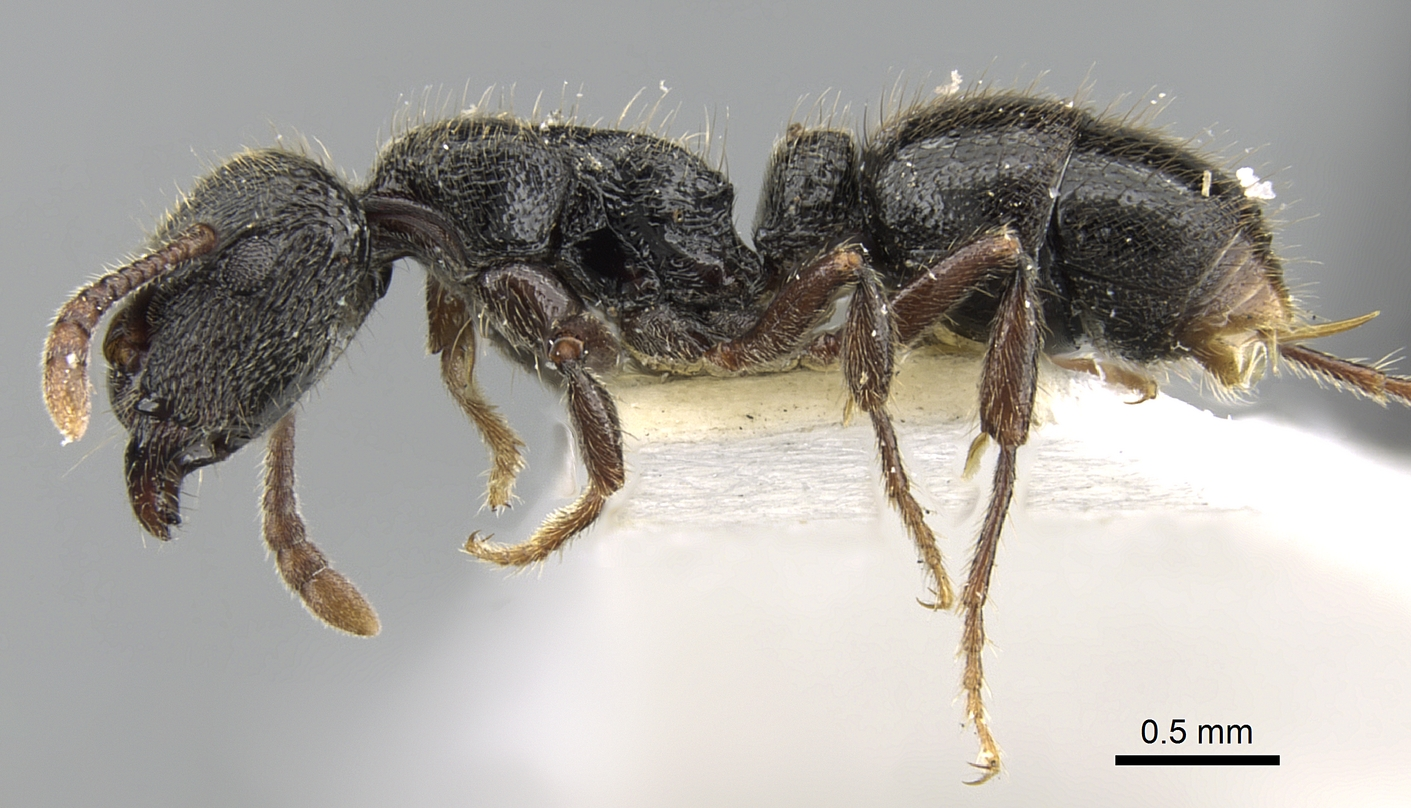

Scientific classification
- Kingdom: Animalia
- Phylum: Arthropoda
- Class: Insecta
- Order: Hymenoptera
- Family: Formicidae
- Genus: Heteroponera
- Species: H. carinifrons

Binomial name
- Heteroponera carinifrons Mayr, 1887

= Heteroponera carinifrons =

Species of ant

Heteroponera carinifrons is a species of ant in the genus Heteroponera, endemic to Chile. It was described by Mayr in 1887.
