= Heteroponera relicta =

Scientific classification
- Kingdom: Animalia
- Phylum: Arthropoda
- Class: Insecta
- Order: Hymenoptera
- Family: Formicidae
- Genus: Heteroponera
- Species: H. relicta

Binomial name
- Heteroponera relicta (Wheeler, W.M., 1915)

Species of ant

Heteroponera relicta is a species of ant in the genus Heteroponera. Endemic to Australia, it was described by Wheeler in 1915.
