= Heteroponera monticola =

Scientific classification
- Domain: Eukaryota
- Kingdom: Animalia
- Phylum: Arthropoda
- Class: Insecta
- Order: Hymenoptera
- Family: Formicidae
- Genus: Heteroponera
- Species: H. monticola

Binomial name
- Heteroponera monticola Kempf & Brown, 1970

Species of ant

Heteroponera monticola is a species of ant in the genus Heteroponera. Described by Kempf and Brown in 1970, Colonies are mainly inhabit high wet regions in Colombia, particularly in parts where ants of whatever kind are scarce.
