= Heteroponera inermis =

Scientific classification
- Domain: Eukaryota
- Kingdom: Animalia
- Phylum: Arthropoda
- Class: Insecta
- Order: Hymenoptera
- Family: Formicidae
- Genus: Heteroponera
- Species: H. inermis

Binomial name
- Heteroponera inermis (Emery, 1894)

Synonyms
- Acanthoponera dolo schwebeli Luederwaldt, 1918

Species of ant

Heteroponera inermis is a species of ant in the genus Heteroponera. Endemic to Brazil, it was described by Carlo Emery in 1894.
