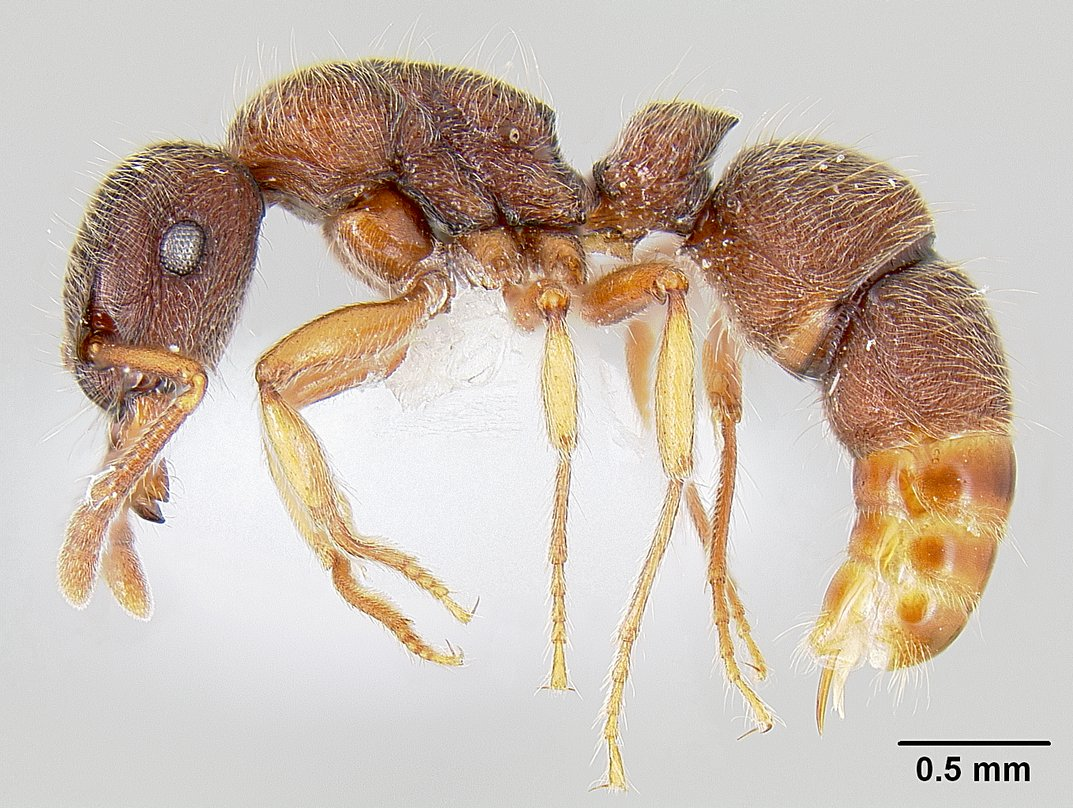

Scientific classification
- Domain: Eukaryota
- Kingdom: Animalia
- Phylum: Arthropoda
- Class: Insecta
- Order: Hymenoptera
- Family: Formicidae
- Genus: Heteroponera
- Species: H. panamensis

Binomial name
- Heteroponera panamensis (Forel, 1899)

= Heteroponera panamensis =

Species of ant

Heteroponera panamensis is a species of ant in the genus Heteroponera. Endemic to Costa Rica and Panama, It was described by Auguste-Henri Forel in 1899.
