= Heteroponera imbellis =

Scientific classification
- Kingdom: Animalia
- Phylum: Arthropoda
- Class: Insecta
- Order: Hymenoptera
- Family: Formicidae
- Genus: Heteroponera
- Species: H. imbellis

Binomial name
- Heteroponera imbellis (Emery, 1895)

Synonyms
- Acanthoponera imbellis scabra Wheeler, W.M., 1923; Acanthoponera nigra Clark, 1930; Acanthoponera occidentalis Clark, 1926; Ectatomma imbellis hilare Forel, 1895

Species of ant

Heteroponera imbellis is a species of ant, in the genus Heteroponera. Endemic to Australia, it was described by Carlo Emery in 1895.
