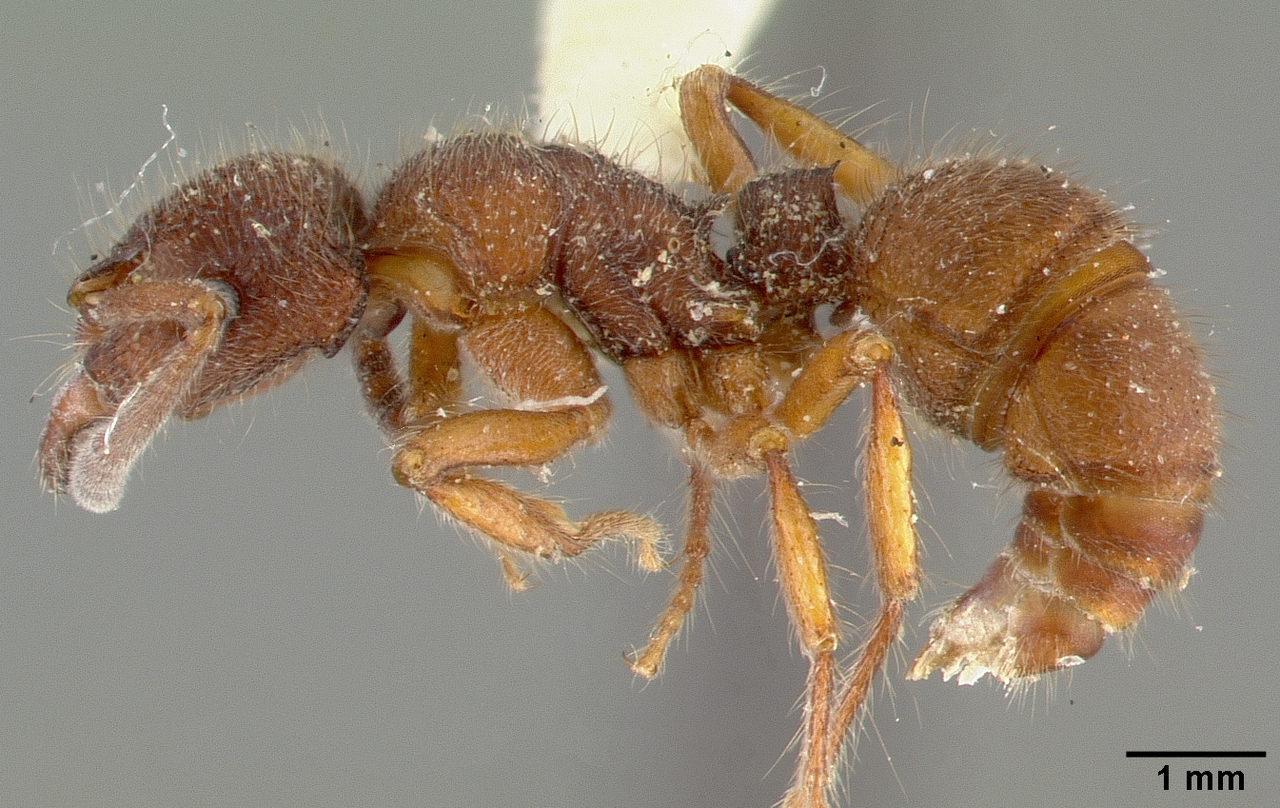

Scientific classification
- Domain: Eukaryota
- Kingdom: Animalia
- Phylum: Arthropoda
- Class: Insecta
- Order: Hymenoptera
- Family: Formicidae
- Genus: Heteroponera
- Species: H. inca

Binomial name
- Heteroponera inca Brown, 1958

= Heteroponera inca =

Species of ant

Heteroponera inca is a species of ant in the genus Heteroponera. Endemic to Colombia, it was described by William Louis Brown Jr. in 1958.
