= Heteroponera dentinodis =

Scientific classification
- Domain: Eukaryota
- Kingdom: Animalia
- Phylum: Arthropoda
- Class: Insecta
- Order: Hymenoptera
- Family: Formicidae
- Genus: Heteroponera
- Species: H. dentinodis

Binomial name
- Heteroponera dentinodis (Mayr, 1887)

Species of ant

Heteroponera dentinodis is a species of ant in the genus Heteroponera, endemic to Chile and Brazil. It was described by Mayr in 1887.
