= Heteroponera majeri =

Scientific classification
- Kingdom: Animalia
- Phylum: Arthropoda
- Class: Insecta
- Order: Hymenoptera
- Family: Formicidae
- Genus: Heteroponera
- Species: H. majeri

Binomial name
- Heteroponera majeri Taylor, 2011

Species of ant

Heteroponera majeri is a species of ant in the genus Heteroponera. Endemic to Australia, it was recently described by Taylor in 2011. Its appearance is far different to other Heteroponera species that reside in Australia.
