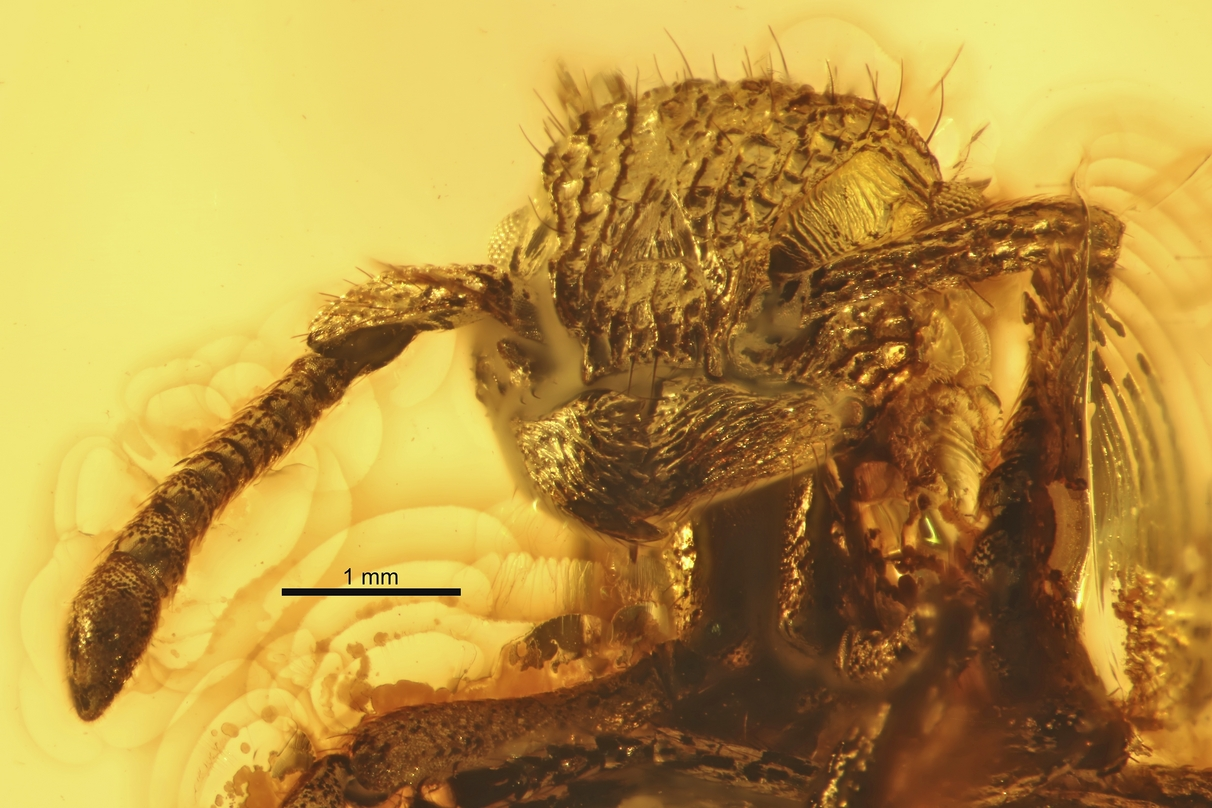
- Close-up of the head of Agroecomyrmex duisburgi

Scientific classification
- Kingdom: Animalia
- Phylum: Arthropoda
- Class: Insecta
- Order: Hymenoptera
- Family: Formicidae
- Subfamily: Agroecomyrmecinae
- Tribe: Agroecomyrmecini
- Genus: †Agroecomyrmex; Wheeler, 1910
- Species: †A. duisburgi

Binomial name
- †Agroecomyrmex duisburgi (Mayr, 1868)

Synonyms
- Myrmica duisburgi Mayr, 1868

= Agroecomyrmex =

Agroecomyrmex Temporal range: Lutetian

Extinct genus of ants

Agroecomyrmex is an extinct genus of ants in the formicid subfamily Agroecomyrmecinae, for which it is the type genus. The genus contains a single described species, Agroecomyrmex duisburgi. Agroecomyrmex is known from a group of Middle Eocene fossils which were found in Europe.

== History and classification ==
When described Agroecomyrmex was known only from five separate fossils, the holotype worker, number 639/10246, plus three paratype workers and a single paratype female, which are fossilized as inclusions in transparent chunks of Baltic amber. Baltic amber is approximately forty six million years old, having been deposited during Lutetian stage of the Middle Eocene. There is debate on what plant family the amber was produced by, with evidence supporting relatives of either an Agathis relative or a Pseudolarix relative. All the type specimens were collected over 125 years ago, and when first described were part of the University of Königsberg amber collection. The fossils were first studied by Austrian entomologist Gustav Mayr who placed the species in the living genus Myrmica. Mayr's 1868 type description of the new species was published in the journal Beitrage zur Naturkunde Preussens. The species was moved to the new genus Agroecomyrmex in a short note in 1910 by William Morton Wheeler. Wheeler expanded upon and gave a full description of the new genus in his 1915 paper The ants of the Baltic amber. In the description Wheeler recognized the very distinct morphology of the species, and that it was not closely related to the Myrmica species. Since its description two other related genera have been described, the late Eocene genus Eulithomyrmex from the Florissant Formation of Colorado, and the living genus Tatuidris from Central and South America. Placement of the group has changed several times, with the genera being placed in the Myrmicinae tribe Agroecomyrmecini from 1930 until 2003. The placement of the tribe was challenged in 2003 by Barry Bolton who suggested a closer relationship between the group and the "poneromorph" subfamilies. in addition to the suggested relationship, Bolton moved the tribe from Myrmicinae to a new subfamily, Agroecomyrmecinae.

== Description ==
The new genus was described from a full alate female and four workers, all of the workers being preserved in a curled up position, obscuring details. Overall it is estimated the female would have been around 5.5 millimetres (0.22 in) long while the workers range between 4 and 5 millimetres (0.16 and 0.20 in). A. duisburgi individuals have heads which are nearly square, being just slightly longer than wide, and slightly wider behind than in front. Individuals have small, very convexly shaped eyes which are placed near the back edge of the head capsule and completely lack ocelli. The mandibles are short and rounded, and have 5 unequal teeth. The antennae are composed of thirteen segments, the terminal three forming a distinct club shape. The head and thorax have a strongly reticulated structuring to the exoskeleton and having an overall black coloration. Agroecomyrmex can be separated from Eulithomyrmex based on the features of the head, with Agroecomyrmex displaying larger mandibles and a smaller antennal club.
