= Heteroponera robusta =

Scientific classification
- Domain: Eukaryota
- Kingdom: Animalia
- Phylum: Arthropoda
- Class: Insecta
- Order: Hymenoptera
- Family: Formicidae
- Genus: Heteroponera
- Species: H. robusta

Binomial name
- Heteroponera robusta Kempf, 1962

Species of ant

Heteroponera robusta is a species of ant in the genus Heteroponera. Endemic to Brazil, it was described by Kempf in 1962.
