= Heteroponera angulata =

Scientific classification
- Domain: Eukaryota
- Kingdom: Animalia
- Phylum: Arthropoda
- Class: Insecta
- Order: Hymenoptera
- Family: Formicidae
- Genus: Heteroponera
- Species: H. angulata

Binomial name
- Heteroponera angulata Borgmeier, 1959

Species of ant

Heteroponera angulata is a species of ant in the genus Heteroponera, endemic to Brazil. It was described by Borgmeier in 1959.
