= Heteroponera georgesi =

Scientific classification
- Domain: Eukaryota
- Kingdom: Animalia
- Phylum: Arthropoda
- Class: Insecta
- Order: Hymenoptera
- Family: Formicidae
- Genus: Heteroponera
- Species: H. georgesi

Binomial name
- Heteroponera georgesi Perrault, 1999

Species of ant

Heteroponera georgesi is a species of ant in the genus Heteroponera. Endemic to French Guiana, it was described by Perrault in 1999.
