= Heteroponera leae =

Scientific classification
- Kingdom: Animalia
- Phylum: Arthropoda
- Class: Insecta
- Order: Hymenoptera
- Family: Formicidae
- Genus: Heteroponera
- Species: H. leae

Binomial name
- Heteroponera leae (Wheeler, W.M., 1923)

Species of ant

Heteroponera leae is a species of ant in the genus Heteroponera. It is endemic to Australia, and was described by Wheeler in 1923. It has a similar appearance to Heteroponera crozieri ants, although H. crozieri ants are more northerly distributed.
