= Heteroponera dolo =

Scientific classification
- Domain: Eukaryota
- Kingdom: Animalia
- Phylum: Arthropoda
- Class: Insecta
- Order: Hymenoptera
- Family: Formicidae
- Genus: Heteroponera
- Species: H. dolo

Binomial name
- Heteroponera dolo (Roger, 1860)

Synonyms
- Acanthoponera dolo aurea Forel, 1913

Species of ant

Heteroponera dolo is a species of ant in the genus Heteroponera, endemic to Argentina, Brazil, Paraguay and Uruguay. It was described by Roger in 1860.
