= Heteroponera crozieri =

Scientific classification
- Kingdom: Animalia
- Phylum: Arthropoda
- Class: Insecta
- Order: Hymenoptera
- Family: Formicidae
- Genus: Heteroponera
- Species: H. crozieri

Binomial name
- Heteroponera crozieri Taylor, 2011

Species of ant

Heteroponera crozieri is a species of ant in the genus Heteroponera endemic to Australia. Described in 2011, the workers look similar to those of Heteroponera leae, although H. leae ants are more southerly distributed.
