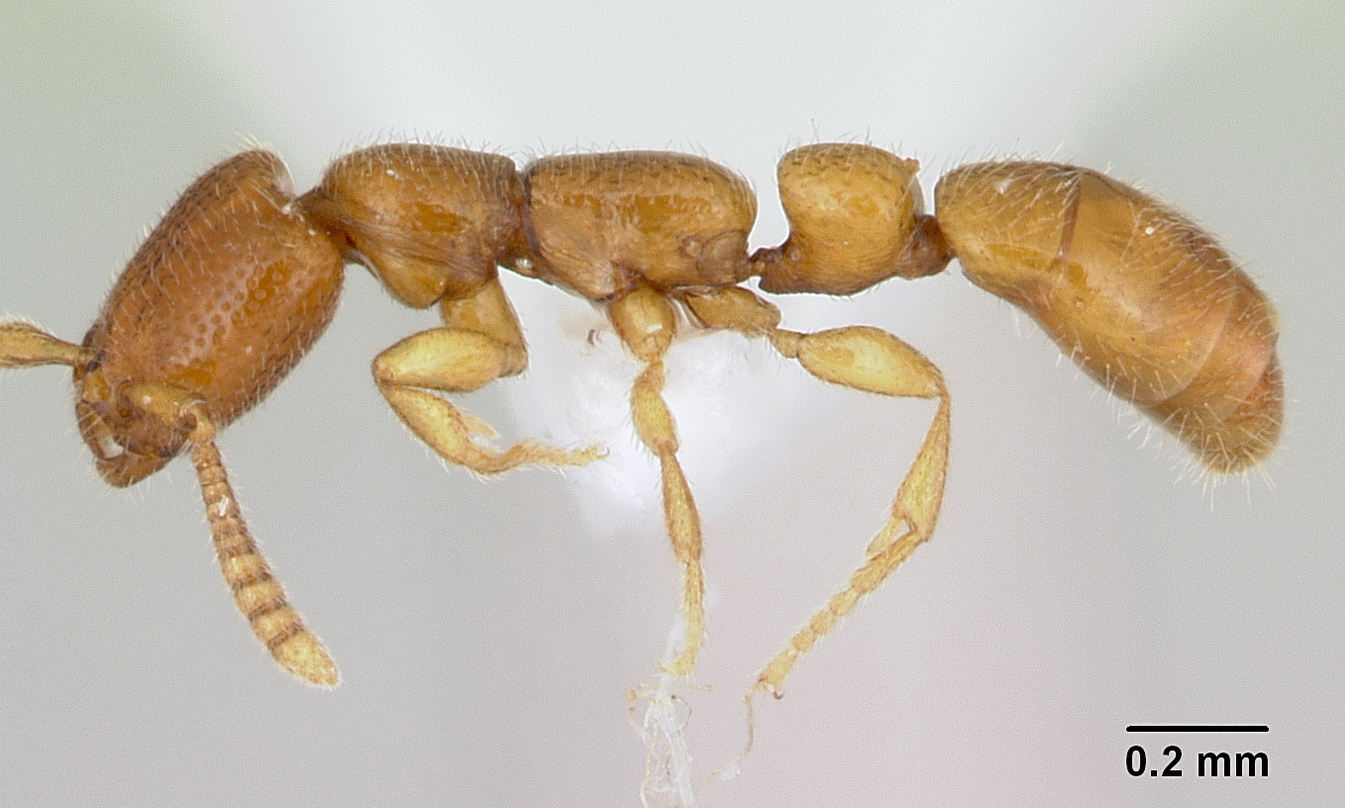
- Apomyrma stygia worker

Scientific classification
- Domain: Eukaryota
- Kingdom: Animalia
- Phylum: Arthropoda
- Class: Insecta
- Order: Hymenoptera
- Family: Formicidae
- Subfamily: Apomyrminae; Dlussky & Fedoseeva, 1988
- Tribe: Apomyrmini; Dlussky & Fedoseeva, 1988
- Genus: Apomyrma; Brown, Gotwald & Levieux 1970
- Species: A. stygia

Binomial name
- Apomyrma stygia Brown, Gotwald & Levieux 1970

= Apomyrma =

Genus of ants

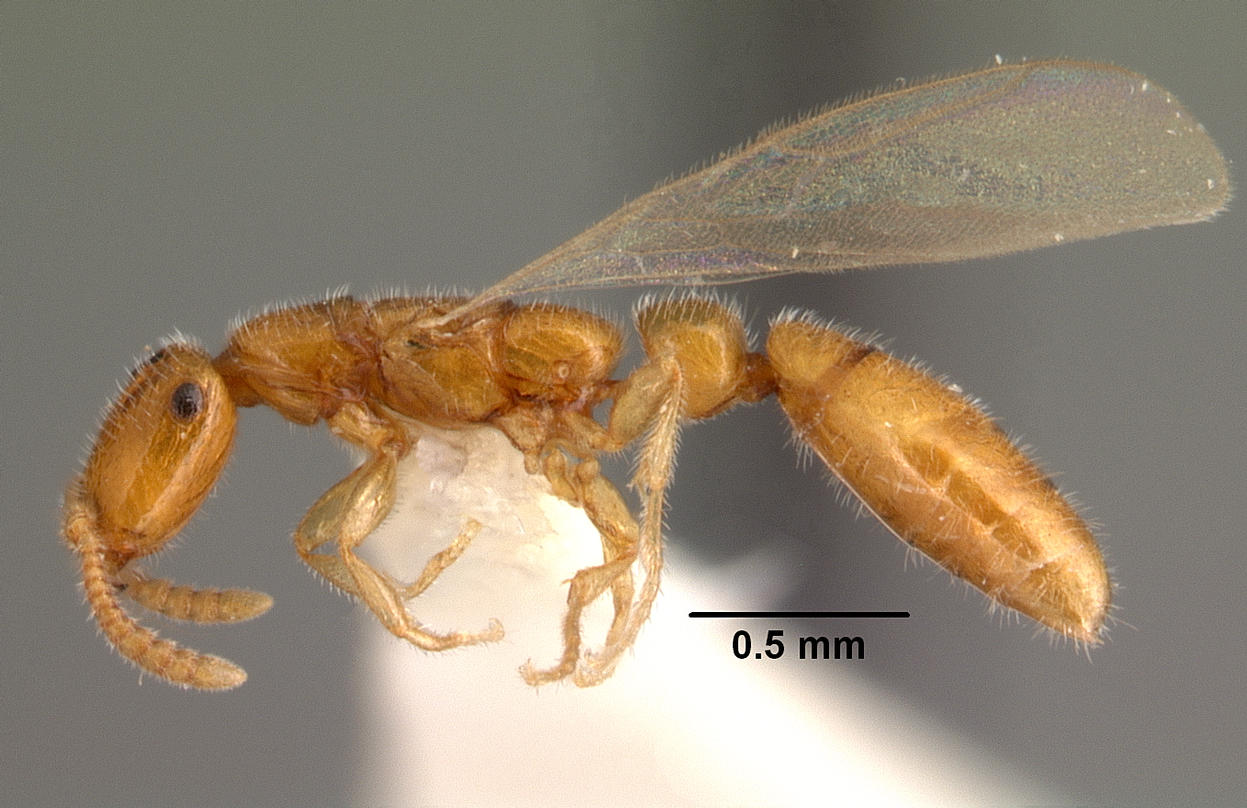
Winged queen

Apomyrma stygia is a species of ant found in West Africa, first described in 1970. It is the only species in the genus Apomyrma, tribe Apomyrmini, and subfamily Apomyrminae. It has been suggested the ant primarily lives in tropical forests, and apparently belongs to a guild of centipede-feeding ants.
