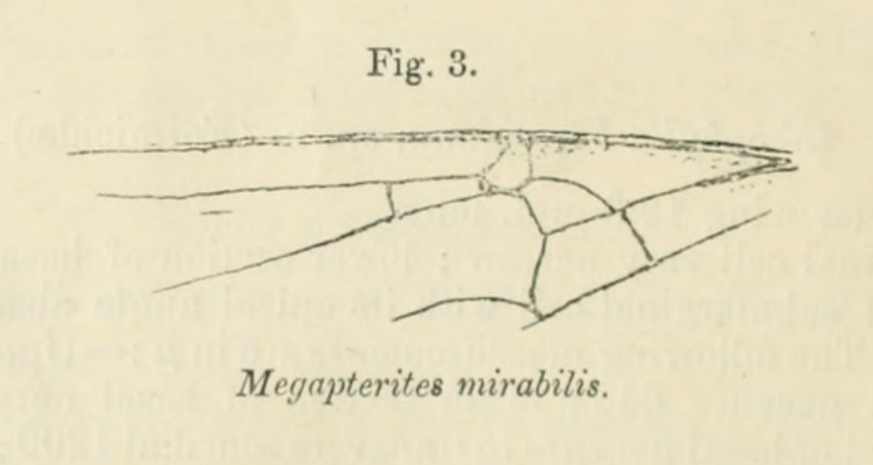
- Formicium mirabile type illustration

Scientific classification
- Kingdom: Animalia
- Phylum: Arthropoda
- Clade: Pancrustacea
- Class: Insecta
- Order: Hymenoptera
- Family: Formicidae
- Subfamily: †Formiciinae
- Genus: †Formicium; Westwood, 1854

Type species
- Formicium brodiei Westwood, 1854

Other species
- Formicium berryi (Carpenter, 1929); Formicium mirabile (Cockerell, 1920)

Synonyms
- Eoponera berryi Carpenter, 1929; Megapterites mirabilis Cockerell, 1920

= Formicium =

Formicium Temporal range: Lutetian, 44.5 Ma

Extinct genus of ants

Formicium is an extinct collective genus of giant ants in the Formicidae subfamily Formiciinae. The genus currently contains three species, Formicium berryi, Formicium brodiei, and Formicium mirabile. All three species were described from Eocene aged sediments.

== History and classification ==
The collective genus Formicium was first established by English entomologist and archaeologist John O. Westwood in 1854. and originally was only described from isolated fossil forewings, with full queens, drones, and workers being described from Germany later. From 1854 until 2010, the genus was expanded to include five species, however the two German species were subsequently removed and placed in the related genus Titanomyrma as T. giganteum and T. simillimum. The species Formicium mirabile, named by Theodore D. A. Cockerell in 1920, and Formicium brodiei, named by Westwood in 1854, are both known from fore-wings recovered from middle Eocene Bagshot Formation of Bournemouth, Dorset, England. The third species named, Formicium berryi was described by Frank M. Carpenter in 1929 from the middle Eocene Claiborne Formation in Puryear, Tennessee, USA, though he misidentified the formation as the Wilcox Formation. F. berryi was the first described occurrence of the genus and, until 2011, the subfamily, in North America.

As the wing structure of Formicidae is very plastic and can vary greatly, even within a species and size between males and females can be notably different, the description of fossil species from wings alone is problematic. With the removal of the two German species described from full body fossils in 2011, Dr. Bruce Archibald and coauthors changed Formicium from a nominal genus to collective genus. They suggested it be used to contain species described from wings which do not have enough detail to place into a nominal genus such as Titanomyrma. As a collective genus, it does not contain a type species per the International Code of Zoological Nomenclature, but is still retained as the type genus for the subfamily Formiciinae.

Formicium berryi was originally described as Eoponera berryi by Frank Carpenter and placed in the extant subfamily Ponerinae. This was based on the idea that the new species was related to the modern genus Dinoponera. When initially described by Theodore D. A. Cockerell, Formicium mirabilis was placed in the monotypic genus Megapterites. At that time he considered the species to be part of the family Pseudosiricidae. This placement was retained in the Treatise on Invertebrate Paleontology Hymenoptera section written by Frank Carpenter. This placement, however did not reflect the changes made by German paleoentomologist Herbert Lutz who synonymized Eoponera into Formicium in 1986 while describing the subfamily Formiciinae and the two German species. His 1990 synonymy of Megapterites into Formicium was also not reflected in the Treatise. Currently both genus names, Megapterites and Eoponera are accepted as junior synonyms of Formicium.

== Description ==
=== F. berryi ===
F. berryi is only known from a forewing 26 millimetres (1.0 in) long and 7 millimetres (0.28 in) wide. It was collected by professor E.W. Berry of the Johns Hopkins University. Owing to the wings size, Carpenter believed that the ant may have been 57 millimetres (2.2 in) long, making it one of the largest ants to ever live. It has a long and narrow stigma (small, colored thick area near the wing-tip), and the discoidal cell is triangular. The apex is absent on the wing, but a complete shape of the wing may resemble that of Myrmecia. The wings have similar dimensions to Dinomyrmex gigas, a giant ant found in Southeast Asia .

=== F. mirabile ===
The F. mirabile holotype is an incomplete forewing of 45 mm (1.8 in) preserved length, and at least a 50 mm (2.0 in) estimated length in life. The specimen and its counterpart were collected by J. S. Gardner and added to the British Museum paleontology collections as specimen "I.2596".
