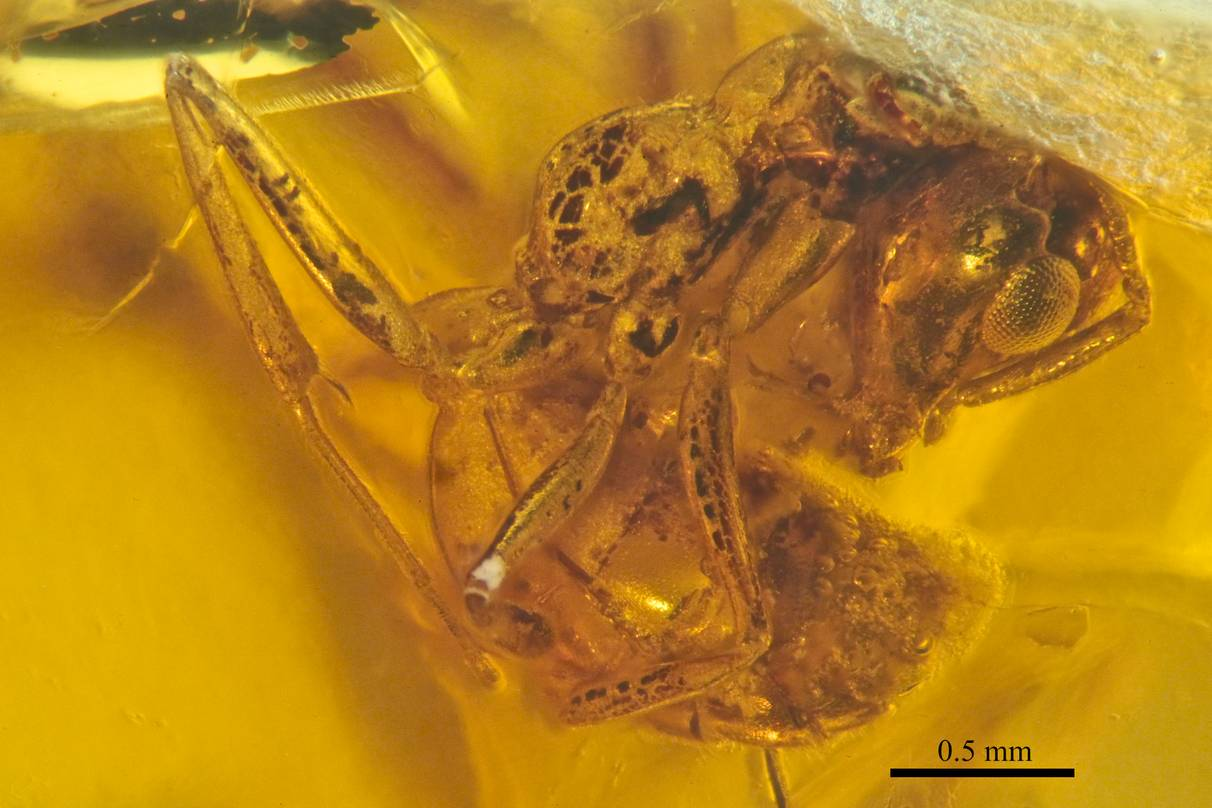
- Brownimecia clavata holotype

Scientific classification
- Kingdom: Animalia
- Phylum: Arthropoda
- Clade: Pancrustacea
- Class: Insecta
- Order: Hymenoptera
- Family: Formicidae
- Subfamily: †Brownimeciinae; Bolton, 2003
- Tribe: †Brownimeciini; Bolton, 2003
- Genus: †Brownimecia; Grimaldi, Agosti & Carpenter, 1997

Type species
- Brownimecia clavata Grimaldi et al., 1997

Species
- Brownimecia inconspicua

= Brownimecia =

Brownimecia Temporal range: 94–90 Ma

Cretaceous ant genus described from amber fossils

Brownimecia is an extinct genus of ants, the only genus in the tribe Brownimeciini and subfamily Brownimeciinae of the Formicidae. Fossils of the identified species, Brownimecia clavata and Brownimecia inconspicua, are known from the Late Cretaceous of North America. The genus is one of several ants described from Late Cretaceous ambers of New Jersey. Brownimecia was initially placed in the subfamily Ponerinae, until it was transferred to its own subfamily in 2003; it can be distinguished from other ants due to its unusual sickle-like mandibles and other morphological features that makes this ant unique among the Formicidae. B. clavata is also small, measuring 3.43 millimetres (0.135 in), and a stinger is present in almost all of the specimens collected. The morphology of the mandibles suggest a high level of feeding specialization.

== History and classification ==
Brownimecia clavata is known from three adult fossils: the holotype—specimen number AMNH NJ-667—collected by Yale Goldman; the paratype; and a third described in 2005. At the time of the genus description, the type specimens were residing in the American Museum of Natural History, in New York City. All the described specimens are worker caste adult females which have been preserved as inclusions in transparent chunks of New Jersey amber. The amber specimens were recovered from deposits of the South Amboy Fire Clay, part of the Raritan Formation. New Jersey amber has been dated to approximately 90 to 94 mya, placing it in the Turonian of the Late Cretaceous. Analysis of the amber composition indicates it originated as cupressaceous resins which were deposited in lagoons and salt water marshes along the Cretaceous eastern seaboard. Brownimecia clavata is one of several ant species described from New Jersey amber, the others being Sphecomyrma freyi, Sphecomyrma mesaki, Baikuris casei, and Kyromyrma neffi.

The type fossils were first studied by paleoentomologists David Grimaldi, Donat Agusti, and James Carpenter of the American Museum. The team's 1997 type description of the new genus and species was published in the journal American Museum Novitates. The genus name was coined by them as a patronym honoring the ant systematist William L. Brown, Jr. who co-described the first Cretaceous ant genus and species Sphecomyrma freyi. The specific epithet clavata was chosen as a reference to the distinctive clubbed antennae seen in the workers. Grimaldi, Agusti, and Carpenter placed the new genus into the extant ant subfamily Ponerinae, without tribal assignment, based on a slight constriction of the gaster. They also noted several features that are shared with ants of the amblyoponine group, then a part of Ponerinae. The workers have genal spurs on the lower edge area under the small compound eyes. Workers also have narrow long mandibles, as do some amblyoponine genera. Placement in Ponerinae was unchanged until a revision of the subfamily was published in 2003 by myrmecologist Barry Bolton. In that paper the subfamily was shown to be a paraphyletic grouping and many of the included genera were moved to separate subfamilies, including the amblyoponines and Brownimecia. Due to the unique combination of morphological features found in Brownimecia, Bolton erected the new subfamily Brownimeciinae for the genus. Bolton notes that its sickle-like mandibles which lack teeth are not usual for ants and are often associated with dulotic, or slave-making, behavior in extant genera. In contrast to stem group ants such as the sphecomyrmines, the scapes of Brownimecia workers are more elongated like those of crown group ants. In his 2007 phylogenetic examination of Formicidae, entomologist Philip Ward notes the possibility that Brownimecia is a crown group genus and placed the subfamily into the informal "poneroid" grouping in his phylogeny.

== Description ==
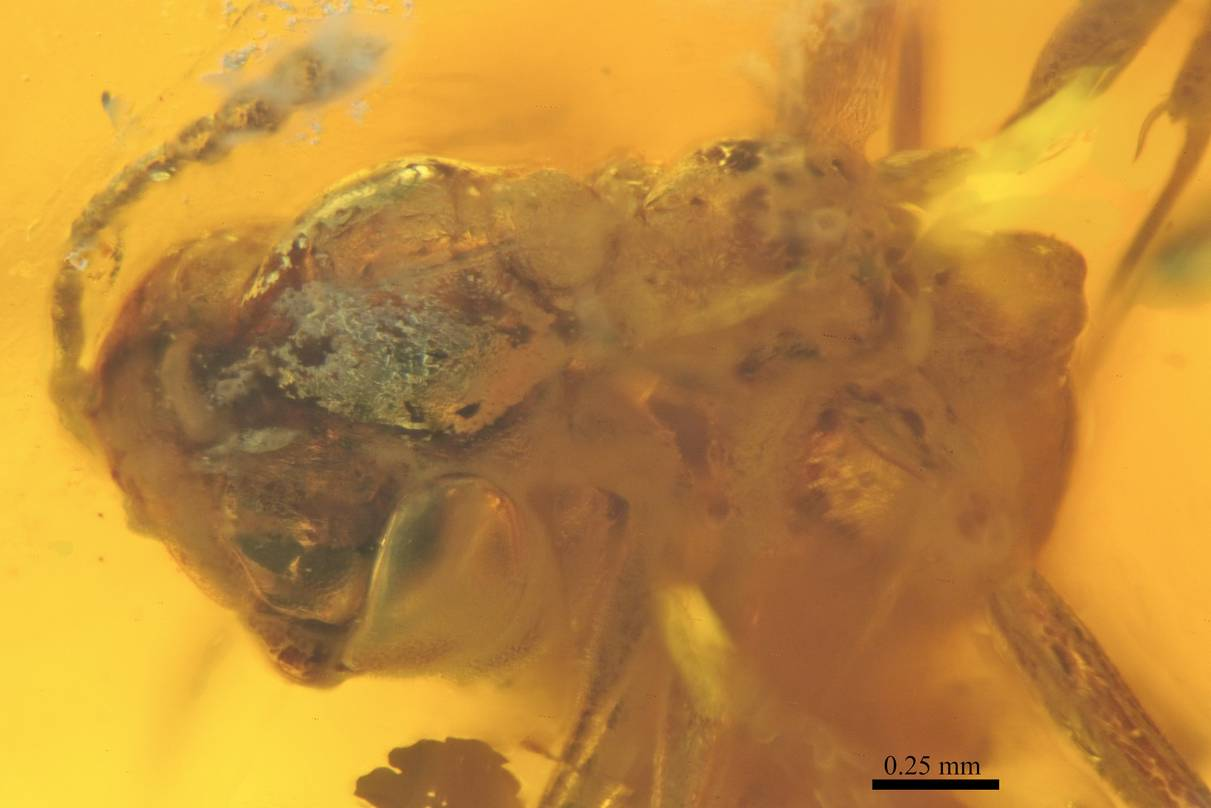
B. clavata holotype, dorsal view

Both the Brownimecia holotype worker and the 2005 worker are complete and fully preserved in curled positions and have their stings extended. The paratype worker is very incomplete; the amber in which it is encased is highly likely to have been at least partly tumble polished in a rock causing the ant to be exposed and portions of the head, left antenna, mid legs, hind legs, and all of the right antennae and forelegs are gone. The exposure allowed the interior cavity of the fossil to be examined under scanning electron microscope after being coated in a layer of gold.

The holotype has an overall body length of approximately 3.43 millimetres (0.135 in) with finely scattered setae on all parts except the notum and propodeum. The head is large with small rounded compound eyes composed of about one hundred ommatidia. The holotype does not clearly show whether the ocelli are present or absent, but they are clearly absent in the 2005 specimen. The mandibles are scimitar-shaped with no teeth present on the interior sides and almost the length of the head. The mandibles cross each other near their mid-length and the oral surfaces bear approximately thirty short needle-like setae. The clypeus is short but wide, crossing almost the whole width of the head. Perpendicular crenelations run along the upper margin of the clypeus on the 2005 specimen. The gena have a distinct tooth-like structure on the lower sides. The eleven segmented antennae are distinct in having a definite clubbed tip, a feature not seen in any other described Cretaceous ants. The apical flagellomere segment is nearly twice the width of the other segments, while the third to the sixth segments are the shortest and the second flagellomere is slightly swollen.

The metathoracic spiracles are raised on small cones projecting from the alitrunk, while the metapleural gland orifices are not notably raised, having a ridge leading to them. All of the alitrunk gland and spiracle orifices are to some degree obscured on the holotype by froths of bubbles that escaped them soon after the worker was entombed in the sap. The petiole top forms a pointed apex instead of a more rounded dome. There is a covering of fine microtrichia hairs on the petiole and a pair of small setae are situated near the apex. At the front of the petiole there is a narrow attachment area to the propodeum, while the rear is flared into a large attachment to the gaster. The helcium, a small exoskeleton plate between the petiole and gaster, is developed and shows crenelations on the rear edge. There is a small but distinct constriction between the first and second segments of the gaster. Both the holotype and 2005 specimens have a fully preserved gaster tip showing the extended sting, while the paratype is missing the tip area.

Due to the unusual morphology of the mandibles, scientists have suggested that Brownimecia may have had a high level of feeding specialization.

- Brownimecia clavata Grimaldi, Agosti & Carpenter, 1997
- Brownimecia inconspicua Sosiak et al., 2024
