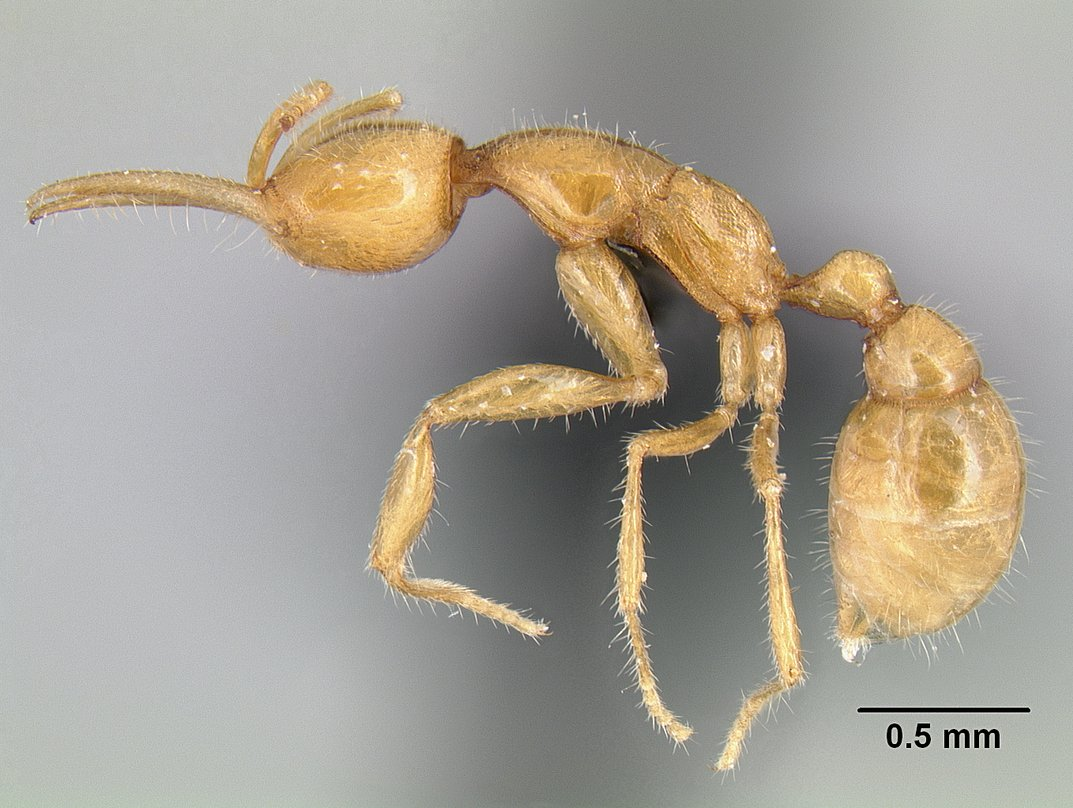
- Martialis heureka worker

Scientific classification
- Domain: Eukaryota
- Kingdom: Animalia
- Phylum: Arthropoda
- Class: Insecta
- Order: Hymenoptera
- Family: Formicidae
- Subfamily: Martialinae
- Genus: Martialis; Rabeling & Verhaagh, 2008
- Species: M. heureka

Binomial name
- Martialis heureka Rabeling & Verhaagh, 2008

= Martialis heureka =

Species of ant

Martialis heureka is a species of ant discovered in 2000 from the Amazon rainforest near Manaus, Brazil. It was described as a new species and placed as the sole member of a new subfamily, Martialinae. The generic name means "from Mars" and was given due to its unusual morphology, and the species epithet heureka indicates the surprising discovery. It belongs to the oldest known distinct lineage to have diverged from the ancestors of all other ants.

== Etymology ==
The aberrant features of this ant led Stefan P. Cover and Edward O. Wilson to comment that it was an ant that had to be from Mars. The genus name, then, refers to the planet Mars, alluding to the strange characteristics that seem to come from nowhere; the species epithet is from Ancient Greek ηὕρηκα "I found it", echoing Archimedes' famous exclamation, meant to epitomize the troubles involved in the rediscovery of the species after the first specimen discovered in a soil sample was lost.

== Discovery ==
Two specimens were first discovered by Manfred Verhaagh of the Staatliches Museum für Naturkunde in Karlsruhe, Germany, in 2000, but they were damaged. Later, a new specimen was collected in 2003 by Christian Rabeling, a graduate student at the University of Texas at Austin.

== Description ==
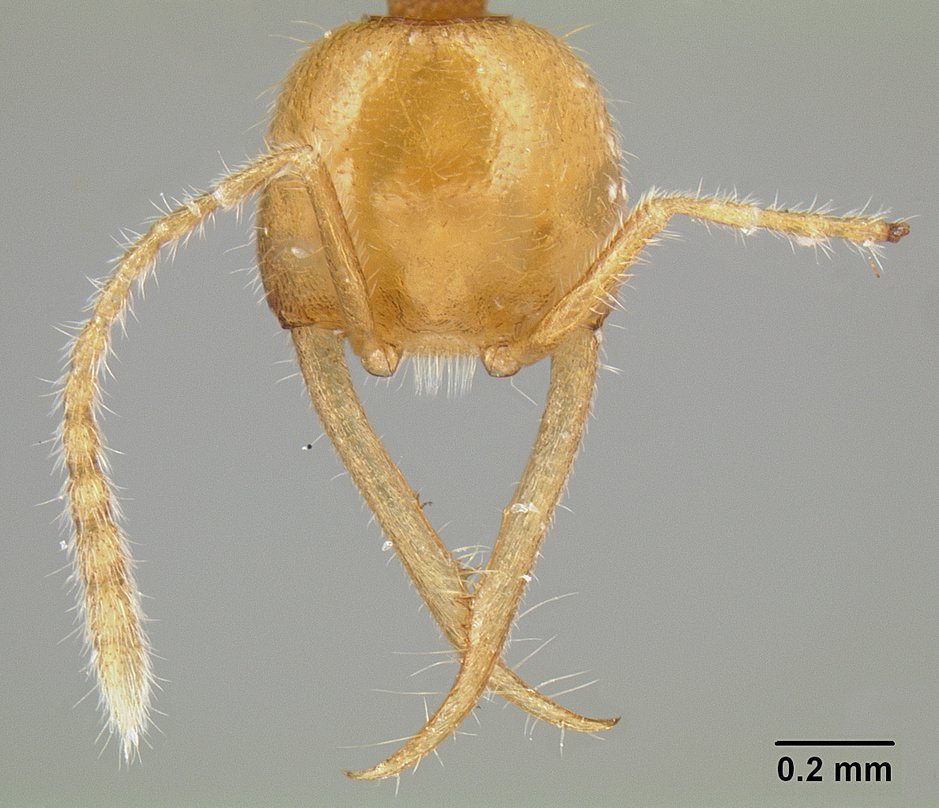
Head of a worker

Like all members of the family Formicidae, these ants have distinctive geniculate (elbowed) antennae, prominent metapleural glands, and distinctive petioles. The ants, though, lack compound eyes, are pale in colour, and lead a subterranean life, preying on small litter organisms. The workers have unusual, elongated mandibles, distinctly basal in their features.

Based on the morphology, the authors suggested the ants lead an underground life, possibly foraging on the surface during the night. The first two specimens were found in soil core samples, while another was found in leaf litter. They probably make use of pre-existing underground cavities, as their legs do not show adaptations for digging.
