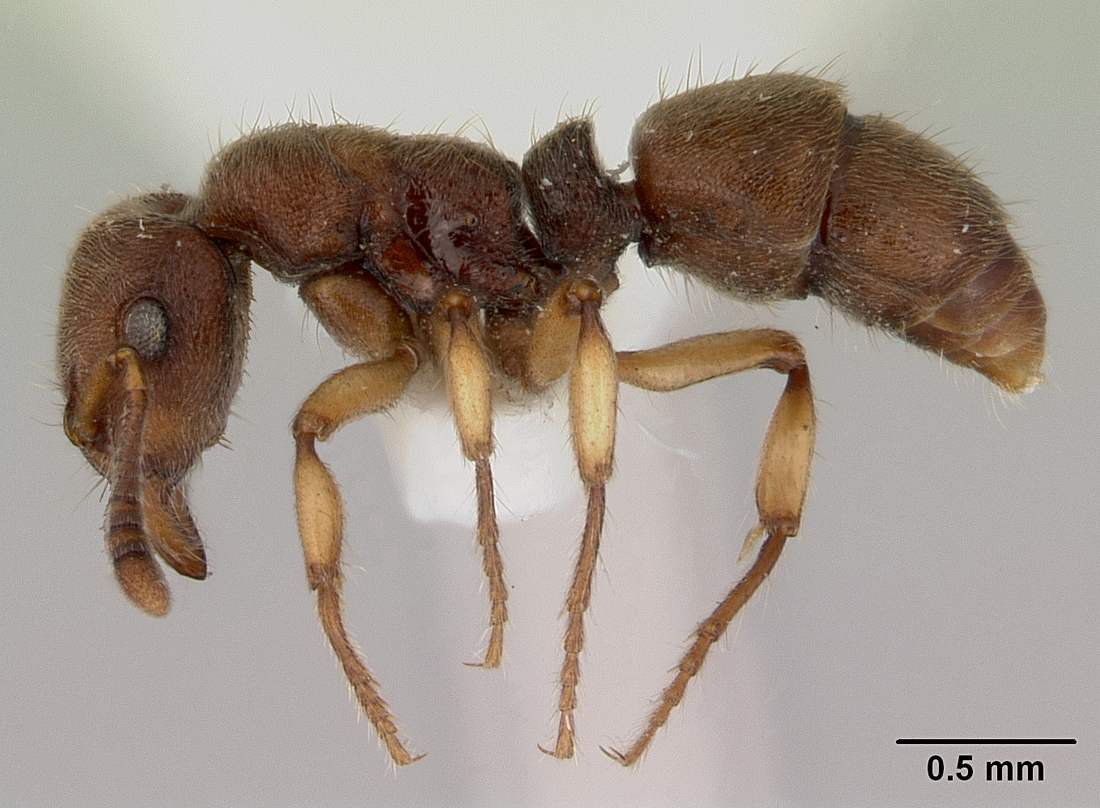
- Heteroponera brouni worker

Scientific classification
- Domain: Eukaryota
- Kingdom: Animalia
- Phylum: Arthropoda
- Class: Insecta
- Order: Hymenoptera
- Family: Formicidae
- Genus: Heteroponera
- Species: H. brouni

Binomial name
- Heteroponera brouni (Forel, 1892)

= Heteroponera brouni =

Species of ant

Heteroponera brouni is a species of ant in the genus Heteroponera. It is endemic to the North Island of New Zealand, and the Three Kings Islands.

Forel named it in 1892 to honor Major Thomas Broun, a significant pioneering amateur entomologist in New Zealand, but the name was mistakenly published as "brownii" (i.e. for "Brown" not "Broun", and with an incorrect second "i"). These errors were corrected by Wheeler (1923), who then also named a spurious subspecies "Heteroponera brouni kirki, later synonymised under H. brouni by W.L. Brown Jr. in 1958. Wheeler's correction was technically "informal" (not involving the International Commission on Zoological Nomenclature), but all subsequent authors have accepted it.
