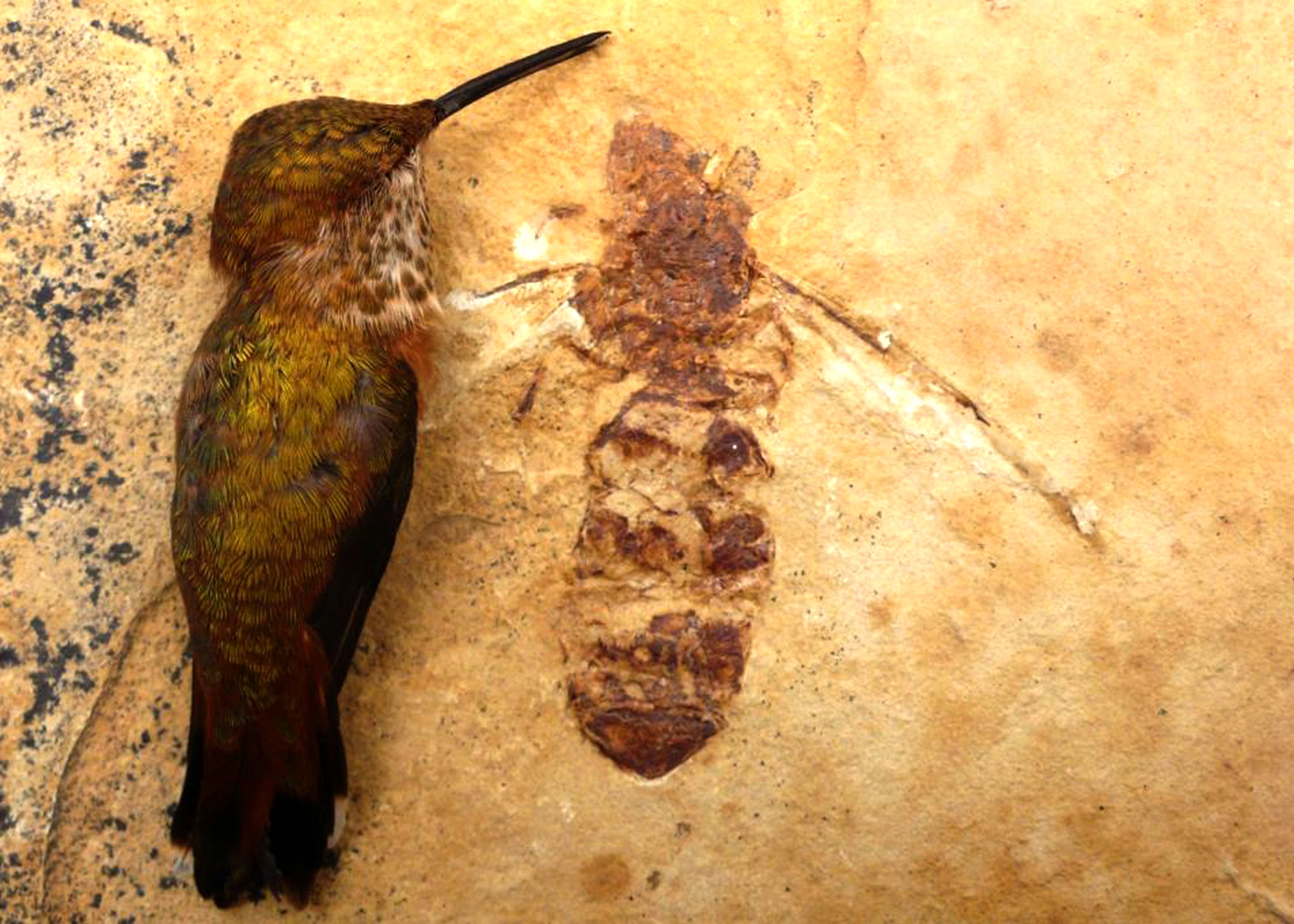
- Titanomyrma, with a rufous hummingbird for scale

Scientific classification
- Domain: Eukaryota
- Kingdom: Animalia
- Phylum: Arthropoda
- Class: Insecta
- Order: Hymenoptera
- Family: Formicidae
- Subfamily: †Formiciinae; Lutz, 1986

Type species
- Formicium berryi Westwood, 1854

Genera
- Formicium Westwood, 1854; Titanomyrma Archibald et al., 2011

= Formiciinae =

Formiciinae Temporal range: Ypresian to Lutetian, 51.9–44.5 Ma

Extinct subfamily of ants

Formiciinae is an extinct subfamily of ants known from Eocene deposits in Europe and North America.

== Genera ==
- Formiciinae Lutz, 1986
  - Formiciini Lutz, 1986
    - Titanomyrma Archibald, et al., 2011
      - Titanomyrma gigantea (Lutz, 1986)
      - Titanomyrma lubei Archibald, et al., 2011
      - Titanomyrma simillima (Lutz, 1986)
    - Formicium Westwood, 1854 (collective group genus)
      - Formicium berryi (Carpenter, 1929)
      - Formicium brodiei Westwood, 1854
      - Formicium mirabile (Cockerell, 1920)

The type genus is Formicium with the genus Titanomyrma being described in 2011. Formicium includes the described species which are known from fossil wings only. Formicium is known from three species. Formicium mirabile, named by Theodore D. A. Cockerell in 1920, and Formicium brodiei, named by John O. Westwood in 1854, are both known from fore wings found in the middle Eocene of Bournemouth, Dorset, England. The third species named, Formicium berryi was named by Frank M. Carpenter in 1929 from the middle Eocene Claiborne Formation in Puryear, Tennessee, USA, though he misidentified the formation as the Wilcox Formation. F. berryi was the first described occurrence of the genus and, until 2011, the subfamily, in North America. With the description of Titanomyrma, the two species already described from complete body specimens, Formicium giganteum and F. simillimum, were transferred to the new genus as Titanomyrma giganteum and T. simillimum respectively. Titanomyrma also contains a third species, T. lubei described in the same paper as the genus and which is the second member of the subfamily known from North America.

== Size ==
While workers belonging to the subfamily have not been found, queens and males for T. giganteum and T. simillimum are known and T. lubei is known from a single queen. The average size for the queens and males in Titanomyrma is equal to that of some of the largest modern ants known. Only the queens of Dorylus wilverthi currently reach similar lengths, up to 52 millimetres (2.0 in) as the smallest species of Titanomyrma, T. lubei.

Formiciinae members were restricted in habitat to living in regions which had a mesic wet climate and an average mean annual temperature of 20 °C (68 °F) or higher. This is similar to the restricted ranges of the largest species of modern ants. The spread of the subfamily from Europe to North America is postulated to have been across the North Atlantic landbridges which were present in the Eocene. While the average temperatures for this route are thought to have been lower than the range needed for Formiciinae species, a series of warmer events throughout the Eocene are suggested as aides in the crossing.
