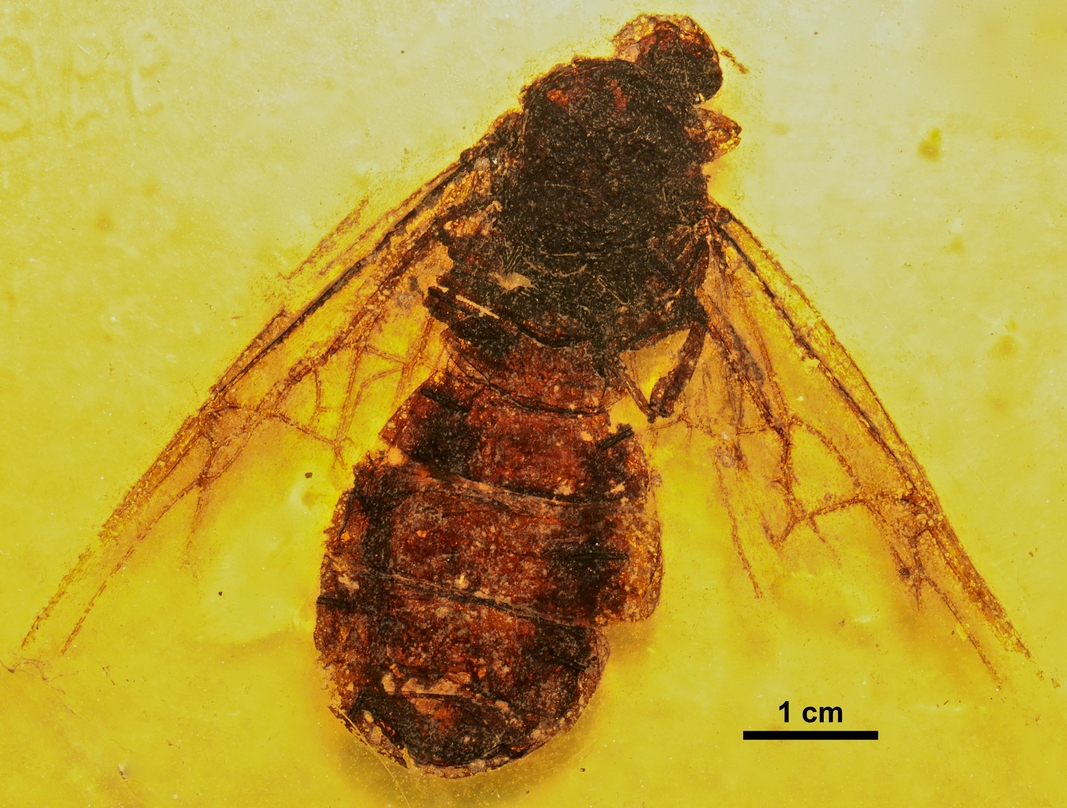
- Dorsal view of T. gigantea holotype, specimen SMFMEI00998

Scientific classification
- Kingdom: Animalia
- Phylum: Arthropoda
- Class: Insecta
- Order: Hymenoptera
- Family: Formicidae
- Subfamily: †Formiciinae
- Genus: †Titanomyrma; Archibald et al., 2011

Species
- Titanomyrma lubei Archibald et al., 2011; Titanomyrma gigantea (Lutz, 1986); Titanomyrma simillima (Lutz, 1986)

= Titanomyrma =

Titanomyrma Temporal range: 51.9–46.2 Ma

Extinct genus of ants

Titanomyrma is a genus of extinct giant ants which lived during the Eocene. The type species Titanomyrma gigantea and the smaller Titanomyrma simillima are known from the Eocene of Germany, while the third species, Titanomyrma lubei, is known from Wyoming, United States. The presence of Titanomyrma in North America was considered to indicate "the first reported cross-Arctic dispersal by a thermophilic insect group". However, a queen reported from upland temperate shales in British Columbia raised questions on the exact thermophilic nature of the genus. The type species of this genus, T. gigantea, is the largest-known species of ant, whether fossil or extant, in the world.

== Taxonomy ==
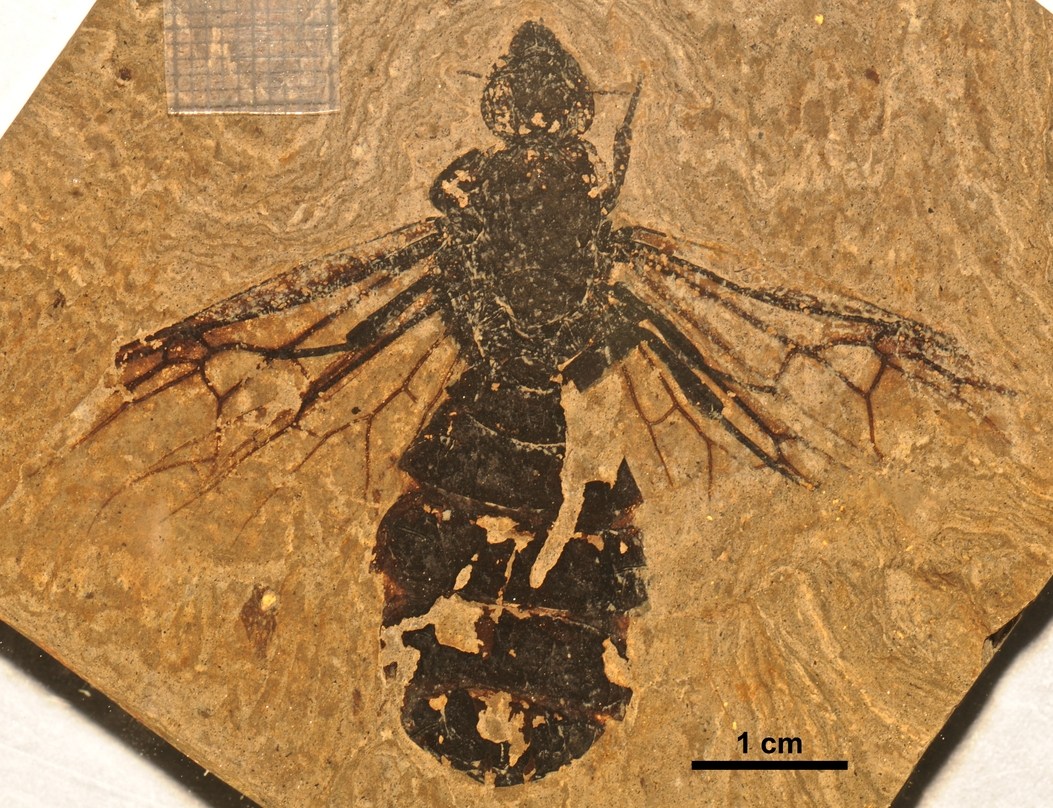
Dorsal view of the Titanomyrma simillima holotype, specimen "SMFMEI01006"

Archibald et al. in 2011 erected the genus Titanomyrma, described the species Titanomyrma lubei and proposed two new combinations, T. gigantea (formerly Formicium giganteum Lutz, 1986) and T. simillima (formerly Formicium simillimum Lutz, 1986). T. gigantea has been designated the type species for the genus.

The name of the genus is a derivative of the Greek Τιτάν (Titan), meaning 'one of prodigious size, strength, or achievement', and alluding to the Titans of Greek mythology; and the Greek word μύρμηξ (myrmex) meaning 'ant'.

The genus Titanomyrma is differentiated from others in the family by the shape of the gaster which is variable. In the three included species the gaster ranges from ovate to more slender or cylindrical. The A5 abdominal segment width relative to other gaster segments is variable and the relative lengths of A3–A7 are also variable.

The queens of the three Titanomyrma can be distinguished from those of other genera most easily by gaster characters. The gasters are more slender in Titanomyrma. Amongst the three species of Titanomyrma, the ratio between length to width of the queens of the three species is as follows, T. lubei – 2.14, T. gigantea – 1.40, and T. simillima – 1.50. The middle half of T. lubei is roughly cylindrical while for other Titanomyrma species, it is ovate with the segment A5 being the widest. The segment A3 has a length about a quarter of the width while for other species it is about a third. The segment A4 is thrice as long as the length of segment A3 while that of A4 segments of other species is less than twice. The segment A5–6 of T. lubei is approximately half as long as it is wide while for other species it is about a third. A3 is not curved around the petiole at the junction.

T. gigantea is the largest giant ant ever found, larger than the biggest extant giant ants, which are the five-centimetre-long (2.0 in) driver ants of the genus Dorylus, found in Central and East Africa. The fossils indicate that the males grew up to 3 centimetres (1.2 in) and the queens grew to 7 centimetres (2.8 in). It had a wingspan of about 16 centimetres (6.3 in).

With the description of the genus Titanomyrma and the description T. lubei, two other species, Formicium giganteum and Formicium simillima, were reclassified into this genus, additional undescribed or unplaced specimens are also known.

=== T. gigantea ===
Titanomyrma gigantea queens and males are described from the Messel Formation, near the village of Messel, in the state of Hessen, 30 km (19 mi) south of Frankfurt am Main in Germany.

=== T. simillima ===
Titanomyrma simillima, as with T. gigantea, are also only known from the Messel Formation, and is slightly smaller in size then the coeval species.

=== T. lubei ===
The Titanomyrma lubei holotype was discovered by Louis Lube at DMNS locality 784, the Farson Fish Beds, in Sweetwater County, Wyoming, USA. The site works Early Eocene lake sediments of the Green River Formations Laney Member.

After discovery, Lube donated the fossil to the collections of the Denver Museum of Nature and Science where it was noticed by paleoentomologist Bruce Archibald and (then) museum chief curator Kirk R. Johnson while they were going through storage drawers. The holotype is of a queen ant comparable in size to a rufous hummingbird, but no workers have been found. The specific epithet of the new species is formed from the surname of the collector of the holotype, Louis Lube., and was the first member of the genus known from North America.

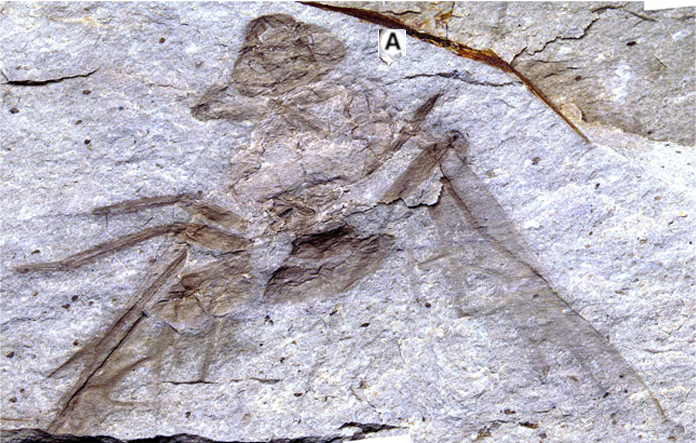
Titianomyrma sp. Eocene Okanagan Highlands

=== Unidentified species ===
An undescribed species has been reported from the Eckfeld Maar of Germany. Archibald, Mathewes, & Aase (2023) reported a Titanomyrma queen from the Allenby Formation, and noted the range extension for Formiciinae into the Eocene Okanagan Highlands, as the subfamily was previously considered a strictly thermophilic ant group. Due to complications arising from preservational distortion during diagenesis, they were unable to determine the correct size of the queen in life. If the distortion was lateral, then compression to bilateral symmetry yielded an adult length of approximately 3.3 cm (1.3 in), placing it the same range as Formicium berryi and F. brodiei, known only from wings, and suggested as possible males. Conversely stretching the fossil to bilateral symmetry results in a larger 5 cm (2.0 in) length estimate, placing it as comparable to queens of T. lubei and T. simillima.

== Paleoecological implications ==
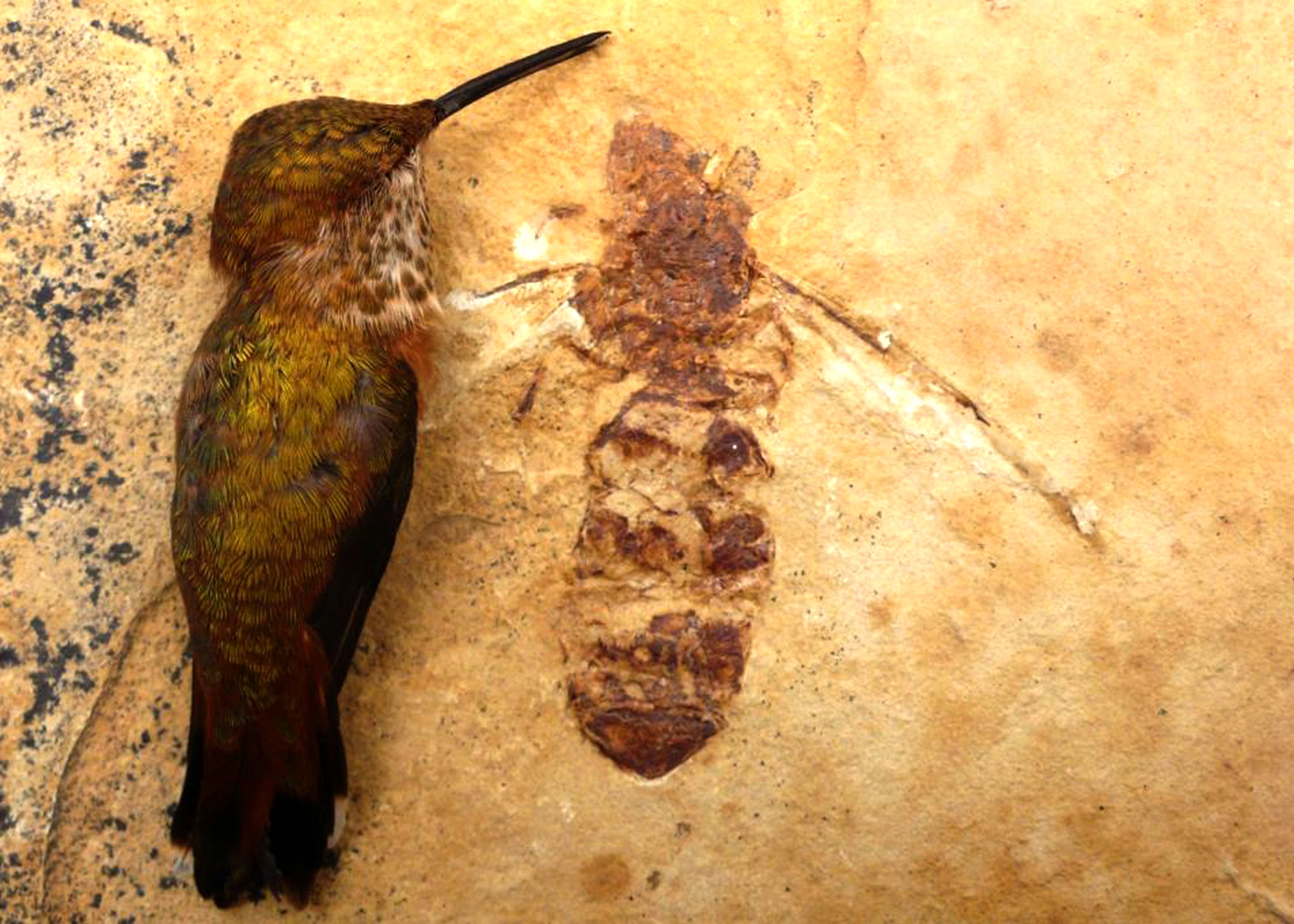
Holotype of T. lubei with rufous hummingbird for scale

The fossils of Titanomyrma gigantea, the first of the genus to be discovered, are very well preserved. They show that T. gigantea did not possess a sting and did not have a closing mechanism on its crop. It is surmised that it must have sprayed formic acid as a defence, and either ate fresh food, in the manner of leafcutter ants (which eat only the fungi they cultivate in their own nests), or was carnivorous. Modern relatives include driver ants. Titanomyrma may have been a precursor species, possibly following a raiding lifestyle and butchering large animals.

T. lubei is related to Formiciinae specimens previously found in Germany and in the Isle of Wight in southern England dating from the same period. It is the first complete Formiciinae fossil from North America; previous evidence that the subfamily lived in North America during the Eocene included an isolated wing from Tennessee. It is a further example, in the northern temperate regions, of tropical fauna and flora such as hippopotamus precursors, tropical plankton and pollen from tropical palms. T. lubei was suggested to support the hypothesis that during the Eocene (56 to 34 million years ago), conditions such as land bridges and hot spells existed which permitted the spread of ancient warmth-loving insects and other forms of life from Europe to North America or vice versa, which would not have occurred had the temperature been uniformly cool throughout. However in 2023, a Titanomyrma queen was reported from the Eocene Okanagan Highlands, a noted upland subtropical to temperate mountain area. The presence of the genus in much cooler temperatures than previously known brought up question regarding how thermophilic the subfamily was.
