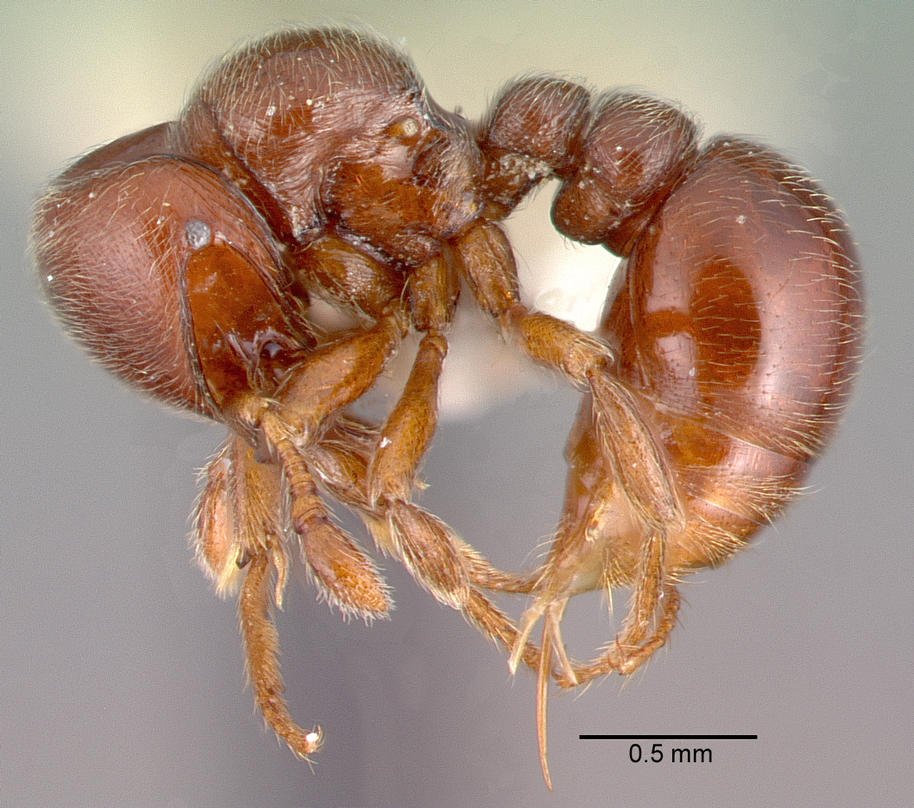
- T. tatusia worker from El Campano, Magdalena, Colombia

Scientific classification
- Kingdom: Animalia
- Phylum: Arthropoda
- Clade: Pancrustacea
- Class: Insecta
- Order: Hymenoptera
- Family: Formicidae
- Subfamily: Agroecomyrmecinae
- Tribe: Agroecomyrmecini
- Genus: Tatuidris; Brown & Kempf, 1968
- Species: T. tatusia

Binomial name
- Tatuidris tatusia Brown & Kempf, 1968

Synonyms
- T. kapasi Lacau & Groc, 2012

= Tatuidris =

Genus of ants

Tatuidris, or armadillo ant, is a rare genus of ants consisting of a single species, Tatuidris tatusia. The ants are small in size and inhabit the leaf litter of Neotropical forests in Central and South America, from Mexico to Brazil. Workers are ferruginous-colored to dark red and present a distinctive morphology, consisting of a shield-like head with a broad vertex, ventrally-turned heavy mandibles which do not overlap at full closure, and unique among ants – an antenna socket apparatus sitting upside-down. Little is known about the biology of the ants, but they are likely nocturnal and specialist predators.

Tatuidris was first described in 1968 and initially placed in the myrmicine tribe Agroecomyrmecini, together with two fossil genera. Since the original description, the systematic status of the tribe has been the focus of debate.

== Taxonomy ==
Tatuidris tatusia is the only species in Tatuidris, a monotypic genus and one of only two extant genera in the subfamily Agroecomyrmecinae. A new species, T. kapasi, was described by Lacau & Groc in 2012, but has now been relegated to a junior synonym under T. tatusia based on the extent of the morphological variability encountered throughout this broad geographic range. Analysis of DNA barcodes indicated a pattern of genetic isolation by distance, suggesting the presence of a single species undergoing allopatric differentiation.

It was first described by Brown & Kempf in 1968 based on two workers collected in a Berlese sample of humus in El Salvador. Due to morphological similarities, they considered it a very primitive ant and placed it in what was then a myrmicine tribe, the Agroecomyrmecini, together with ants known from Early Eocene Baltic amber (Agroecomyrmex) and late Eocene Florissant shale (Eulithomyrmex).

It bears superficial resemblance to some extant genera (Strumigenys, Ishakidris, Pilotrochus, and Phalacromyrmex) but these similarities are considered to be due to convergent evolution. Due to similarities in the habitus, Brown & Kempf (1968) linked Tatuidris to the Dacetini genus Glamyromyrmex (currently a junior synonym of Strumigenys) and Phalacromyrmex. However they concluded: "analysis of these similarities indicates [...] that they are mostly convergent and not based on close phylogenetic relationship". Further work explored the similarities of Tatuidris with Ishakidris (Bolton 1984) and Pilotrochus (Brown 1977). While these taxa share some characteristics, including an expanded head vertex, deep antennal scrobes and a compact mesosoma, the similarities were again deemed convergent.

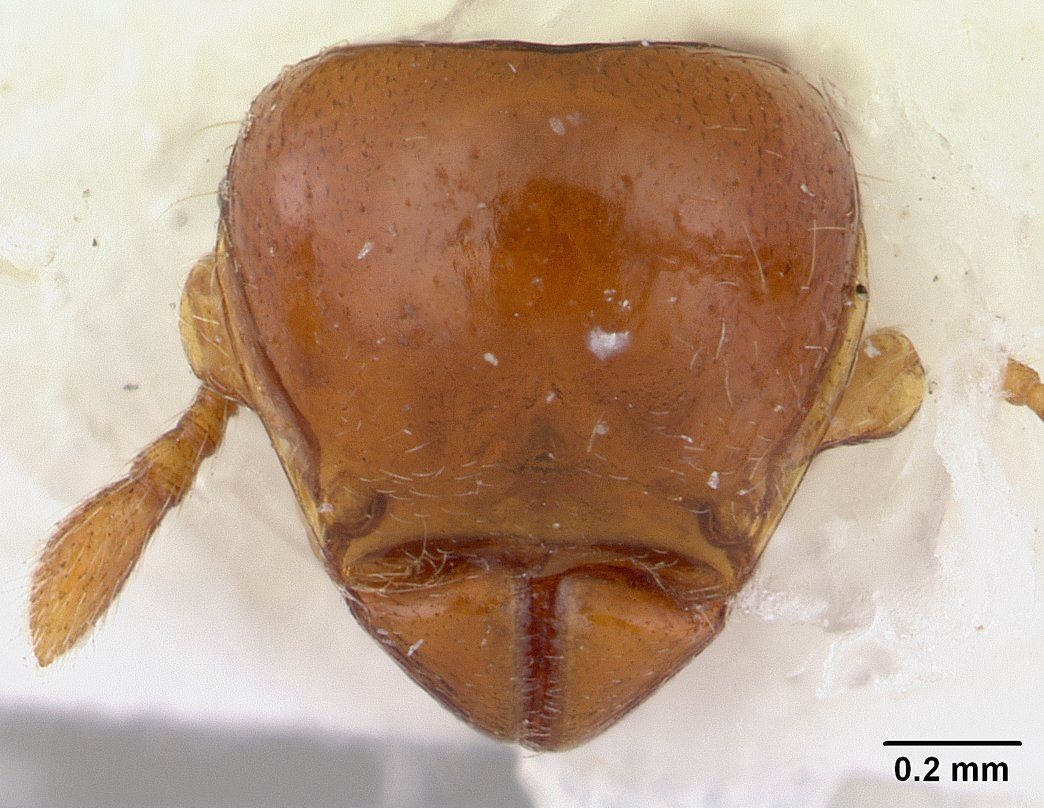
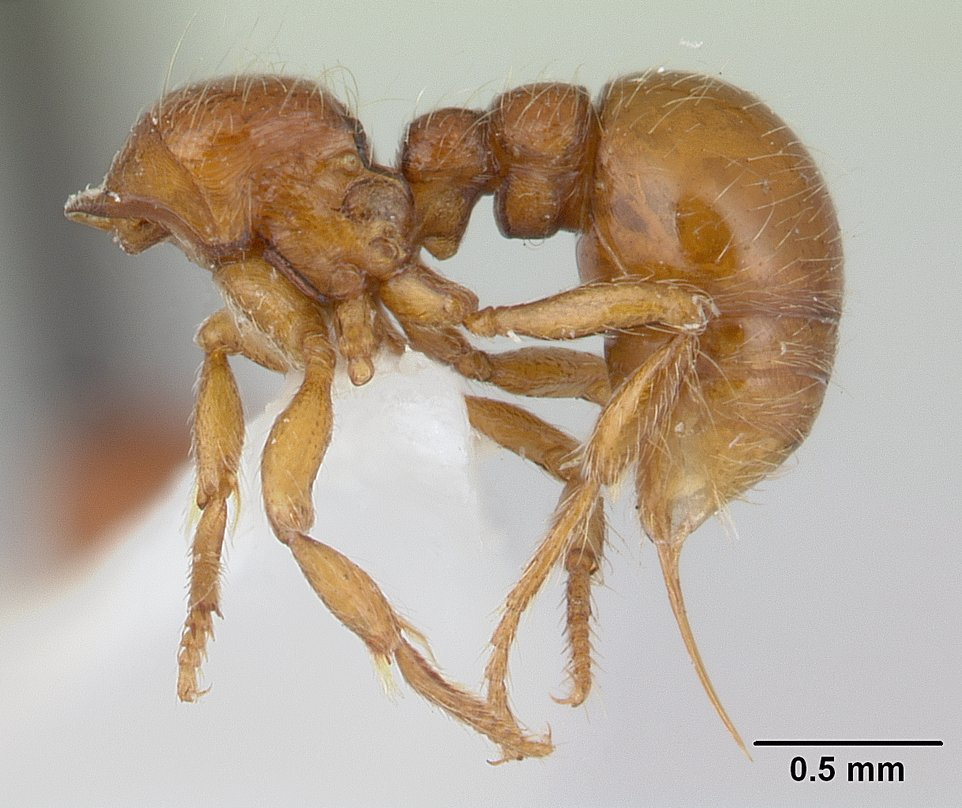
Head and body of the holotype of Tatuidris. Collected in 1961 in Quetzaltepec, La Libertad, El Salvador.

Since the original description, the systematic status of the tribe has been the focus of debate. Bolton (2003) was the first to suggest the taxonomic instability of Tatuidris within Myrmicinae and raised the genus to the level of a new subfamily, the Agroecomyrmecinae, suggesting that Agroecomyrmecinae might be the sister taxon to Myrmicinae. The subfamily rank was re-assessed by Baroni Urbani & de Andrade in 2007, this was the first attempt to include Tatuidris as a terminal taxon in a morphological cladistic analysis. In their study, Baroni Urbani & de Andrade identified morphological synapomorphies shared between Tatuidris and the dacetines, justifying the inclusion of the genus within Myrmicinae. In addition, two autapomorphies (a differently shaped petiolar tergum and sternum, and the eyes at or close to the apex of the antennal scrobe) separated Tatuidris from all other extant ant genera included in their study.

Unlike phylogenetic studies based on morphological traits, molecular analyses of the internal phylogeny of the ants have given strong evidence that the armadillo ants are neither closely related to nor nested within the Myrmicinae. Brady et al. (2006), Moreau et al. (2006) and Rabeling et al. (2008) reconstructed phylogenetic trees with the agroecomyrmecines inside the 'poneroid' group of subfamilies, close to the Paraponerinae, and gave support for the exclusion of the genus from the Myrmicinae, a subfamily located inside the 'formicoid' clade. Given the early appearance of the Agroecomyrmecinae in the geologic record, the similarities of armadillo ants to Myrmicinae were hypothesized to represent convergence and/or retention of plesiomorphic forms.

The name Tatuidris means "armadillo ant", which is also the common name for this species; tatu comes from the Tupi and is the Portuguese word for "armadillo"; the suffix -idris is commonly used when naming ant genera and comes from the Greek word ἴδρις (ídris) "knowledgeable". The specific epithet for the single described species, tatusia, is an old generic name for armadillo.

== Distribution ==
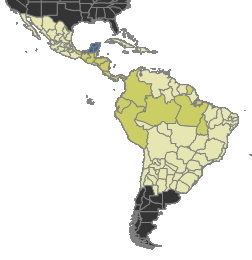
Distribution of Tatuidris: Present / Likely present; Uncertain / Absent; Source: AntWiki

Tatuidris is rare but broadly distributed. The ants inhabit the leaf litter of Neotropical forests in Central and South America, from Mexico to French Guiana, central Brazil, and Amazonian Peru. No collections are known from the Caribbean, Galápagos, or other islands. Most specimens and collections are currently known to occur in localities west of the Andes, with more collections tending to occur towards Central America and Mexico. Most collections come from mountainside (pre-montane) areas at mid elevations (usually 800–1200 meters of altitude). Collections from the lowland Amazon rainforest are few. Published records are few, but with the advent of litter sifting and Winkler extraction as a popular method of ant collecting, Tatuidris are not as rare as they used to seem. Although not very abundant, with frequent litter sifting they can be reliably found in Costa Rican wet forests.

== Description ==
Workers of Tatuidris present a distinctive morphology, consisting of a shield-like head with a broad vertex (upper surface of the head), ventrally-turned heavy mandibles which do not overlap at full closure, deep antennal scrobes (an impression that receives parts of the antenna) with eyes at or close to their apex, compact and fused mesosoma, 7-segmented antenna, first gastral segment ventrally directed, and unique among ants – an antenna socket apparatus sitting upside-down on the roof of the expanded frontal lobe.

The body of a worker is short and compact, ferruginous-colored to dark red, with thick and rigid integument (external "skin"). The body is covered by hairs, which are variable in length and inclination. The head is pyriform (pear-shaped), broadest behind, with small eyes. Queens are similar to workers, but yellow-colored and paler. Their wings are about 60% longer than total body length. Males, also similar to workers (except head), are darker and have wings about 50% longer than the body. The eyes of the queens and males are larger than in workers.

=== Size ===
Specimens of Tatuidris are small, about 3.5 millimeters (0.14 in) (Note: Few specimens have been formally described. The total length (including mandibles) of the T. tatusia holotype worker is 3.5 mm, and the specimen that was used to describe T. kapasi is 3.42 mm.) in total length, but specimens can vary greatly in size, with larger specimens being twice as large as the smaller ones. (Note: Based on specimens measured by Donoso (2012), the average Weber's length (in lateral view, from the base of anterior slope of the pronotum to the lower posteroventral angle of the propodeum) is 0.62 mm, with a minimum of 0.45 mm, and maximum of 0.90 mm.) Size variability within trap catches (possibly same colonies) may be considerable. For example, workers from one collection catch in Nicaragua varied 30% in size. It is still unclear whether intra-colony size variation is due to the presence of morphological worker castes (e.g. minor and major castes) or continuous size variability. Principal component analysis (PCA) revealed that most variability among specimens is related to size, with shape explaining little of total variation.

=== Pilosity variability ===
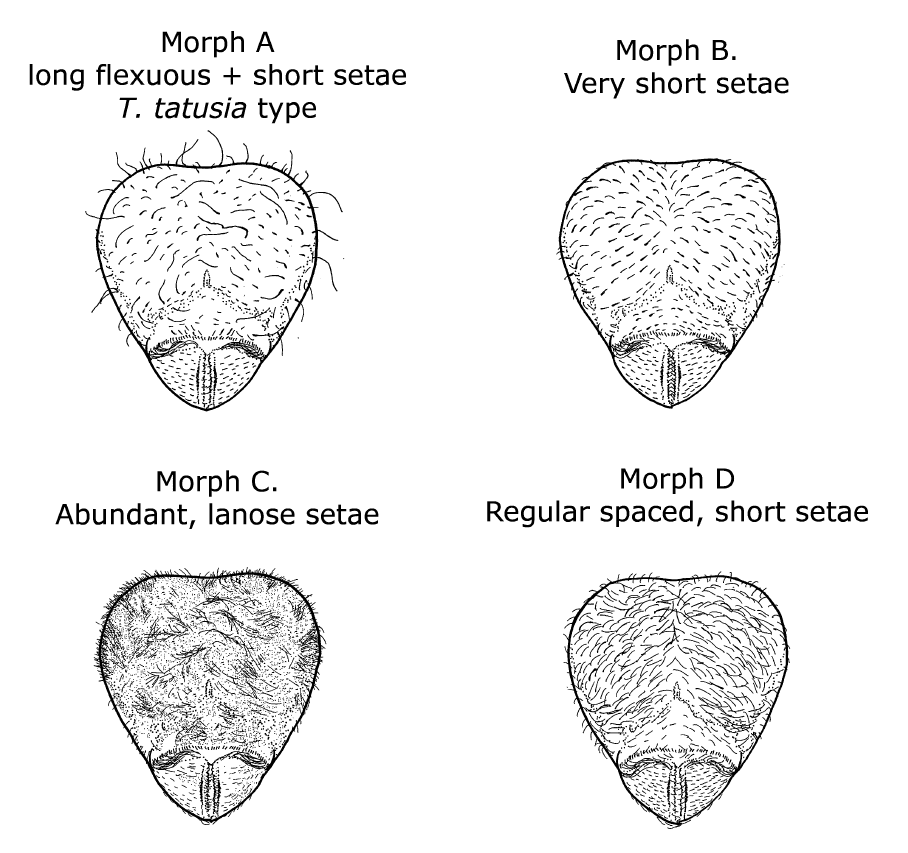
Visual representation of Tatuidris pilosity patterns

Four pilosity patterns (patterns of hair-like setae) are known to occur within Tatuidris collections. Pilosity pattern A consists of a mix of both long flexuous and short appressed setae. This is the most common pilosity pattern and the one that most resembles the type specimens from El Salvador and the gyne from Otongachi, Ecuador. Pilosity pattern B is characterized by very short, fully appressed, and regular spaced setae arrayed homogeneously and equidistantly on the head, mesosoma, petiole, postpetiole and gaster. Pilosity pattern C is characterized by dense lanose-looking setae. Pilosity pattern D consists of short and uniform decumbent (strongly inclined but not fully appressed) setae scattered throughout the body.

=== Eyes ===
The relative position of eyes is highly variable within the species. For example, eye location ranges from being completely within the antennal scrobes to completely outside the scrobes. In some cases the eye itself is located outside the antennal scrobe, but the eye's fossa is well marked and confluent with the antennal scrobe. In most specimens, the antennal carina (ridge extending along the dorsal antennal region) bifurcates from the antennal scrobes and lies straight above the eyes. However, in specimens from Nicaragua, a strongly impressed antennal carina is present. In these specimens about 40% of the eye's area lies within the antennal scrobes. In the gyne, only ~1/6 of the eye lies within the antennal scrobes. A depression sometimes forms in the integument in the sides of the propodeum, below the propodeal spiracle and above the metapleural gland. The depth of this depression varies among specimens and tends to be deepest in larger specimens.

== Biology ==
The biology is poorly known; the male and female reproductive castes were described for the first time in 2012. The genus is known mainly from isolated workers found in Winkler or Berlese samples. Tatuidris workers have peculiar mandibular brushes and a powerful sting, which led Brown & Kempf to speculate that Tatuidris might be specialist predators of active or slippery arthropod prey. Until 2011, no observations of live specimens were registered. Details of a first collection event of a small live colony (3 workers and 4 gynes) by Thibaut Delsinne in a mid-elevation forest in southeastern Ecuador suggest that Tatuidris may well be a highly specialized predator, as colonies kept in captivity did not accept any food item offered to them. Food items rejected by the ants included live and dead termites, millipedes, mites, various insect parts, sugar water, tuna, biscuits, live and dead fruit flies (Drosophila), live springtails, live myriapods (Chilopoda and Diplopoda), live and dead Diplura, small live spiders, small live pseudoscorpions, one small snail, uncooked hen egg (i.e. piece of cotton wool soaked with fresh whisked hen egg), ant larvae (Gnamptogenys sp.), and live ant workers (Cyphomyrmex sp., Brachymyrmex sp.). Potential food items (arthropods) for Tatuidris were taken from soil samples and Winkler samples collected at the site where Tatuidris was a priori determined to be present.

Further observations suggest that Tatuidris may be a sit-and-wait predator. Delsinne observed that "both workers and gynes moved very slowly and were very clumsy. They often remained motionless during several tens of seconds or even several minutes when disturbed (either by my handling or by the contact with another arthropod)." These observations were mainly performed at night, suggesting that Tatuidris may be nocturnal, a hypothesis also supported by collection patterns. For example, in the Río Toachi forest of Ecuador Tatuidris specimens tend to fall in pitfall traps, instead of Winkler sacs. Because pitfall traps usually work 24-h, but Winkler sacs generally uses litter sifted during the day, then ants with nocturnal habits may be underrepresented in Winkler samples. The small eyes of Tatudris species provide further support for this hypothesis.
