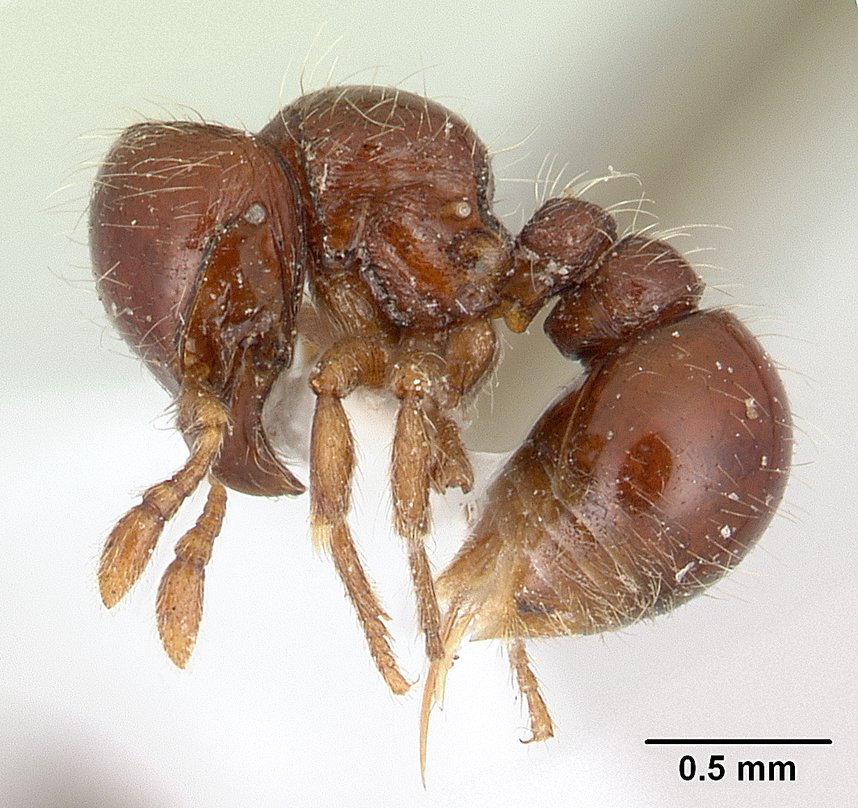
- Tatuidris tatusia

Scientific classification
- Kingdom: Animalia
- Phylum: Arthropoda
- Clade: Pancrustacea
- Class: Insecta
- Order: Hymenoptera
- Family: Formicidae
- Clade: Poneria
- Subfamily: Agroecomyrmecinae; Carpenter, 1930

Type genus
- †Agroecomyrmex Wheeler, 1910

Tribes and genera
- See text

= Agroecomyrmecinae =

Agroecomyrmecinae Temporal range: Lutetian–Recent

Subfamily of ants

Agroecomyrmecinae is a subfamily of ants containing two extant and two fossil genera. The subfamily was originally classified in 1930 by Frank M. Carpenter as Agroecomyrmecini, a Myrmicinae tribe. Bolton raised the tribe to subfamily status in 2003, suggesting that Agroecomyrmecinae might be the sister taxon to Myrmicinae. It has since been discovered to be one of the earliest lineages of ants, a clade from the basal polytomy for all ants. In 2014, the subfamily was expanded to two tribes. The tribe Ankylomyrmini was moved from the subfamily Myrmicinae to Agroemyrmecinae.

== Tribes and genera ==
- Agroecomyrmecinae Carpenter, 1930
  - Agroecomyrmecini Carpenter, 1930
    - †Agroecomyrmex Wheeler, 1910
      - †Agroecomyrmex duisburgi Wheeler, 1910
    - †Eulithomyrmex Carpenter, 1935
      - †Eulithomyrmex rugosus Carpenter, 1930
      - †Eulithomyrmex striatus Carpenter, 1930
    - Tatuidris Brown & Kempf, 1968
      - Tatuidris tatusia Brown & Kempf, 1968 (=T. kapasi Lacau & Groc, 2012)
  - Ankylomyrmini
    - Ankylomyrma Bolton, 1973
      - Ankylomyrma coronacantha Bolton, 1973

== Taxonomy ==
Since the original description, the systematic status of the Agroecomyrmecini tribe has been the focus of intense debate. Bolton (2003) was the first to suggest the taxonomic instability of Tatuidris within Myrmicinae and raised the genus to the level of a new subfamily, the Agroecomyrmecinae, suggesting the Agroecomyrmecinae might be the sister taxon to Myrmicinae. This assessment was based on these diagnostic characters:

1. large mandibles with mandibular masticatory margins that oppose at full closure but do not overlap
2. eyes at extreme posterior apex of deep antennal scrobes
3. clypeus very broadly triangular, broadly inserted between the frontal lobes
4. antennal sockets and frontal lobes strongly migrated laterally, far apart and close to lateral margins of the head
5. mesotibia and metatibia with pectinate spurs
6. short and compact mesosoma
7. a sessile petiole, in posterior view the tergite and sternite not equally convex
8. an abdominal segment III (postpetiole) without tergosternal fusion, segment large and very broadly articulated to segment IV,
9. a helcium in frontal view with the sternite bulging ventrally and overlapped by the tergite
10. an abdominal segment IV with a complete tergosternal fusion, (Note: This character was described incorrectly by Bolton (l.c.); in Tatuidris the tergosternal suture of the abdominal segment IV is strong but not fused.)
11. abdominal segment IV with a stridulitrum on the pretergite
12. the sternite of abdominal segment IV is reduced, the tergite is much larger than the sternite and strongly vaulted

The subfamily rank of the armadillo ants was reassessed by Baroni Urbani & de Andrade (2007) in their last systematic assessment of the dacetines. They analyzed a morphological dataset that included former dacetines, basicerotines, phalacromyrmecines, and Tatuidris, as well as other non-Myrmicinae taxa such as the Australian genus Myrmecia and the Neotropical genus Pseudomyrmex. This work was the first attempt to include Tatuidris as a terminal taxon in a morphological cladistic analysis. In their study, Baroni Urbani & de Andrade (2007) identified six morphological synapomorphies shared between Tatuidris and the dacetines, justifying the inclusion of the genus within Myrmicinae. These characters included:

1. mandibles at rest opposing at least in part, instead of crossing
2. a mandibular-torular index < 130
3. reduction of maxillary palps from double-jointed to single-jointed
4. reduced male mandibles
5. presence of a two-segmented antennal club
6. reduced number of antennal joints

In addition, two autapomorphies (a differently shaped petiolar tergum and sternum, and the eyes at or close to the apex of the antennal scrobe) separated Tatuidris from all other extant ant genera included in their study.

Unlike phylogenetic studies based on morphological traits, molecular analyses of the internal phylogeny of the ants have given strong evidence that the armadillo ants are neither closely related to nor nested within the Myrmicinae. Brady et al. (2006), Moreau et al. (2006) and Rabeling et al. (2008) reconstructed phylogenetic trees with the agroecomyrmecines inside the 'poneroid' group of subfamilies, close to the Paraponerinae, and gave support for the exclusion of the genus from the Myrmicinae, a subfamily located inside the 'formicoid' clade. Given the early appearance of the Agroecomyrmecinae in the geologic record, the similarities of armadillo ants to Myrmicinae were hypothesized to represent convergence and/or retention of plesiomorphic forms.

Recently, Keller (2011) challenged the phylogenetic relationships of the poneromorph subfamilies (including Tatuidris).

=== Distribution ===
According to Brown & Kempf (1967), agroecomyrmecines were probably widespread in both hemispheres during the early Tertiary. Agroecomyrmex is known from Early Eocene, Lutetian, Baltic amber dating to 44 million years (Myr) ago, and Eulithomyrmex from late Eocene, Priabonian, Florissant shale (34.1 Myr ago) in present-day Colorado, United States.

Tatuidris, rare but broadly distributed, inhabits the leaf litter of Neotropical forests in Central and South America, from Mexico to French Guiana, central Brazil, and Amazonian Peru. Ankylomyrma is known only from Western Africa.
