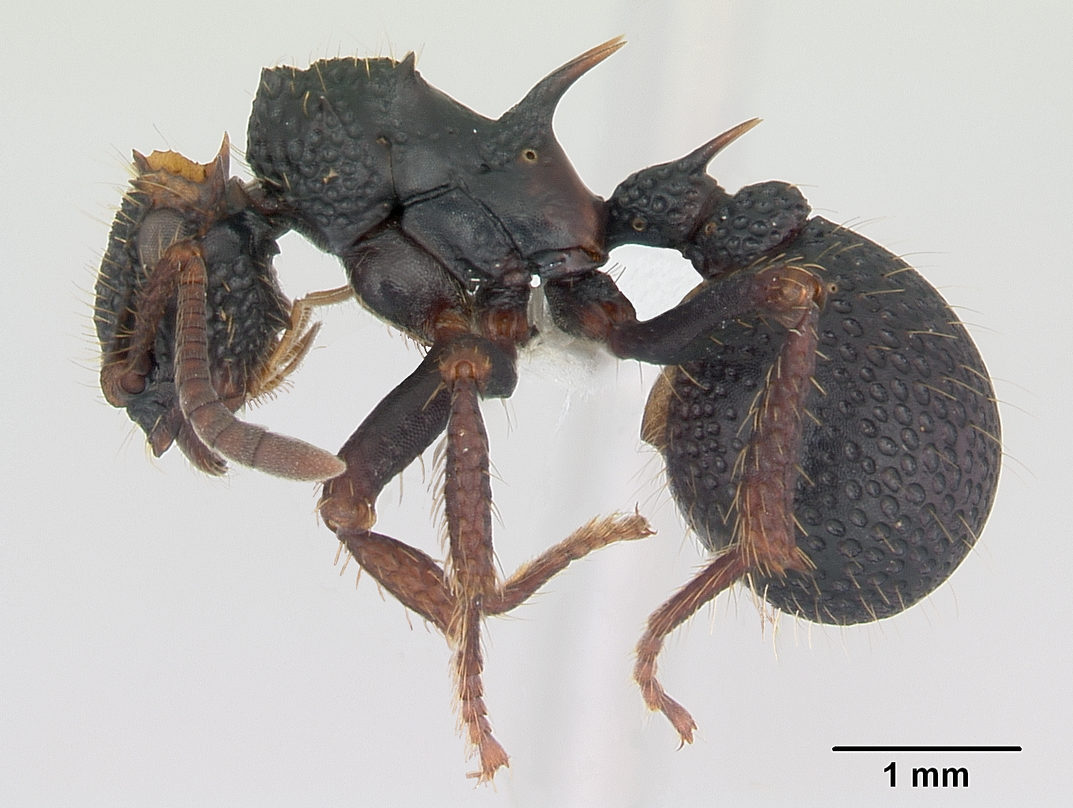
- A. coronacantha worker

Scientific classification
- Domain: Eukaryota
- Kingdom: Animalia
- Phylum: Arthropoda
- Class: Insecta
- Order: Hymenoptera
- Family: Formicidae
- Subfamily: Agroecomyrmecinae
- Tribe: Ankylomyrmini; Bolton, 2003
- Genus: Ankylomyrma; Bolton, 1973
- Species: A. coronacantha

Binomial name
- Ankylomyrma coronacantha Bolton, 1973

= Ankylomyrma =

Genus of ants

Ankylomyrma, from Ancient Greek ἀγκύλος (ankúlos), meaning "curved", and μύρμηξ (múrmēx), meaning "ant", is a genus of large arboreal ants in the subfamily Agroecomyrmecinae. It contains the single species Ankylomyrma coronacantha, the sole member of the tribe Ankylomyrmini. The genus is known from Africa. Nothing is known about their biology. The genus was moved from the subfamily Myrmicinae to Agroecomyrmecinae in 2014.
