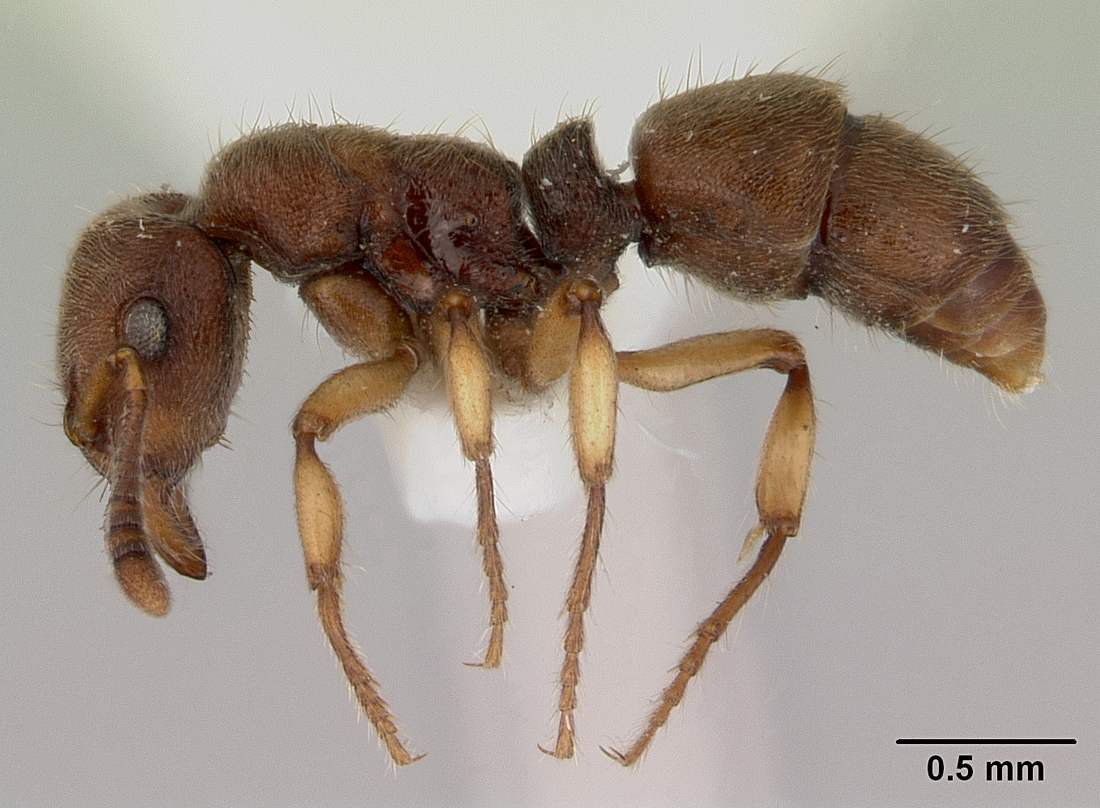
- Heteroponera brounii worker from New Zealand

Scientific classification
- Domain: Eukaryota
- Kingdom: Animalia
- Phylum: Arthropoda
- Class: Insecta
- Order: Hymenoptera
- Family: Formicidae
- Subfamily: Ectatomminae
- Tribe: Heteroponerini
- Genus: Heteroponera; Mayr, 1887

Type species
- Heteroponera carinifrons Mayr, 1887

Diversity
- 28 species

Synonyms
- Anacanthoponera Wheeler, 1923; Paranomopone Wheeler, 1915

= Heteroponera =

Genus of ants

Heteroponera is a genus of ants in the subfamily of Ectatomminae. The genus is known to originate from the Neotropics (from Costa Rica to Uruguay and Chile) and Australasia.

== Species ==
- Heteroponera angulata Borgmeier, 1959
- Heteroponera brounii (Forel, 1892)
- Heteroponera carinifrons Mayr, 1887
- Heteroponera crozieri Taylor, 2011
- Heteroponera darlingtonorum Taylor, 2015
- Heteroponera dentinodis (Mayr, 1887)
- Heteroponera dolo (Roger, 1860)
- Heteroponera ecarinata Taylor, 2015
- Heteroponera flava Kempf, 1962
- Heteroponera georgesi Perrault, 1999
- Heteroponera imbellis (Emery, 1895)
- Heteroponera inca Brown, 1958
- Heteroponera inermis (Emery, 1894)
- Heteroponera leae (Wheeler, 1923)
- Heteroponera lioprocta Taylor, 2015
- Heteroponera majeri Taylor, 2011
- Heteroponera mayri Kempf, 1962
- Heteroponera microps Borgmeier, 1957
- Heteroponera monteithi Taylor, 2015
- Heteroponera monticola Kempf & Brown, 1970
- Heteroponera panamensis (Forel, 1899)
- Heteroponera pendergrasti Taylor, 2015
- Heteroponera relicta (Wheeler, 1915)
- Heteroponera rhodopygea Taylor, 2015
- Heteroponera robusta Kempf, 1962
- Heteroponera trachypyx Taylor, 2015
- Heteroponera viviennae Taylor, 2015
- Heteroponera wilsoni Taylor, 2015
