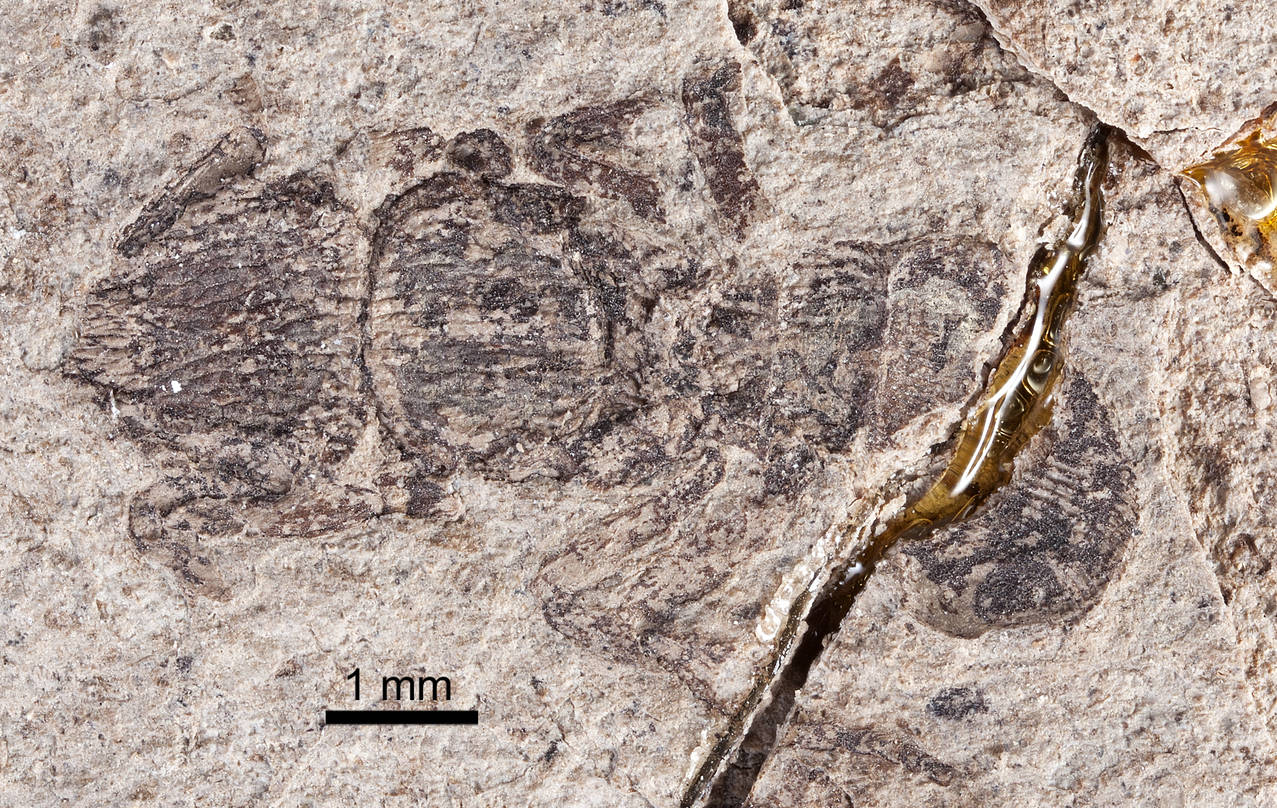
- E. rugosus holotype

Scientific classification
- Kingdom: Animalia
- Phylum: Arthropoda
- Clade: Pancrustacea
- Class: Insecta
- Order: Hymenoptera
- Family: Formicidae
- Subfamily: Agroecomyrmecinae
- Tribe: Agroecomyrmecini
- Genus: †Eulithomyrmex; Carpenter, 1935

Species
- E. rugosus (Carpenter, 1930); E. striatus (Carpenter, 1930)

Synonyms
- Lithomyrmex Carpenter, 1930

= Eulithomyrmex =

Eulithomyrmex Temporal range: Priabonian

Extinct genus of ants

Eulithomyrmex is an extinct genus of ant in the formicid subfamily Agroecomyrmecinae. The genus contains two described species, Eulithomyrmex rugosus and Eulithomyrmex striatus. Eulithomyrmex is known from a group of Late Eocene fossils which were found in North America.

== History and classification ==
When described the genus Eulithomyrmex was known from over forty separate fossils preserved as impressions in fine shales of the Florissant formation in Colorado. The formation is composed of successive lake deposits which have preserved a diverse assemblage of insects. The insects and plants suggest a climate similar to modern Southeastern North America, with a number of taxa represented that are now found in the subtropics to tropics and confined to the Old World. When Eulithomyrmex was described, the Florissant formation was considered to be Miocene in age, based on the flora and fauna preserved. Successive research and fossil descriptions moved the age older and by 1985 the formation had been reassigned to an Oligocene age. Further refinement of the formation's age using radiometric dating of sanidine crystals has resulted in an age of 34 million years old. This places the formation in the Eocene Priabonian stage.

At the time of description the holotype and three paratypes of E. rugosus plus the holotype and single paratype of E. striatus were deposited in the Museum of Comparative Zoology paleontology collections at Harvard University. One additional paratype specimen, number 17,019a, was part of the collections of the University of Colorado. The fossils were first studied by paleoentomologist Frank M. Carpenter of the Museum of Comparative Zoology. His 1930 type description of the new species was published in the Bulletin of the Museum of Comparative Zoology. Carpenter described the genus under the name Lithomyrmex, with the two species respectively as Lithomyrmex rugosus and Lithomyrmex striatus. Carpenter designated L. rugosus as the type species for the genus. At the time of Carpenter's description, the generic name Lithomyrmex had already been used in 1929 for a modern ant species Lithomyrmex glauerti. As a result, Carpenter moved the two species to the new genus Eulithomyrmex.

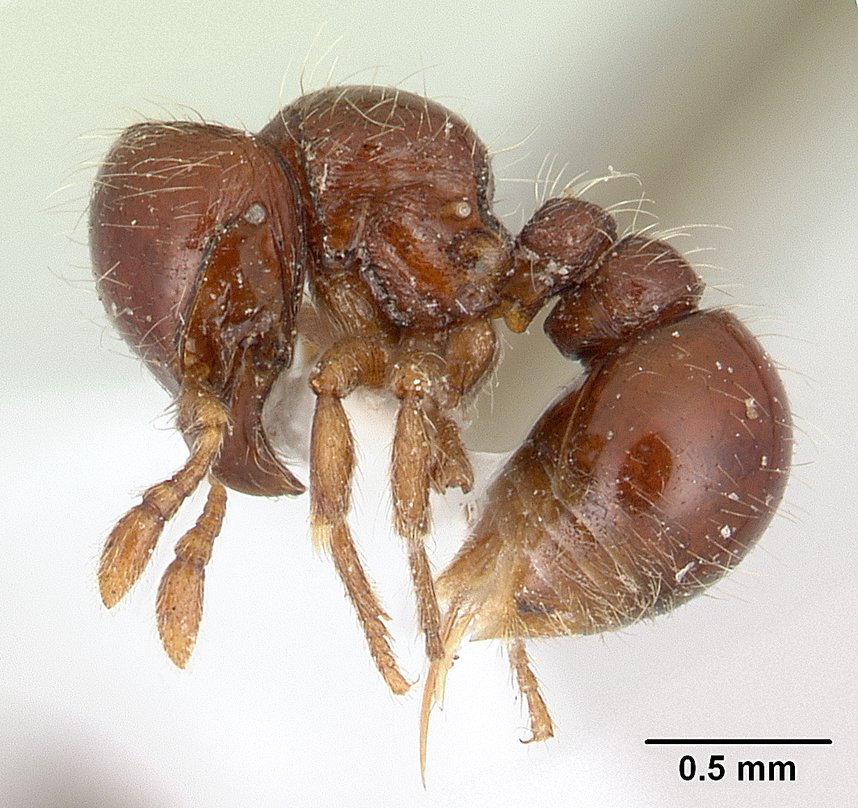
modern Tatuidris tatusia worker

When described Carpenter noted the similarity between Eulithomyrmex and the genus Agroecomyrmex known from Baltic amber fossils and described in 1910 and placed both into the tribe Agroecomyrmecini. A third genus was added to the group in 1968 with the description of the living genus Tatuidris found in Central and South America. Placement of the group has changed several times, with the genera being placed in the Myrmicinae tribe Agroecomyrmecini from 1930 until 2003. The placement of the tribe was challenged in 2003 by Barry Bolton who suggested a closer relationship between the group and the "poneromorph" subfamilies. In addition to the suggested relationship, Bolton moved the tribe from Myrmicinae to a new subfamily, Agroecomyrmecinae.

== Description ==
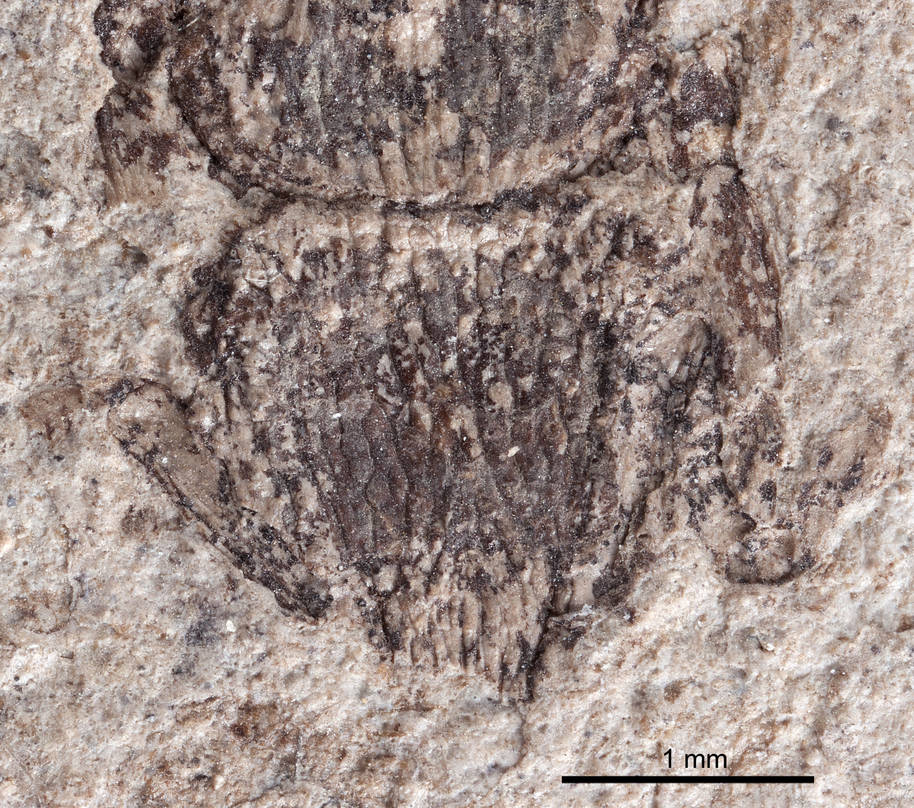
Eulithomyrmex rugosus head close up

In general the two Eulithomyrmex are considered very similar to Agroecomyrmex duisburgi and the two genera can be separated based on the features of the head, with Agroecomyrmex displaying larger mandibles and a smaller antennal club. Overall Eulithomyrmex species have a nearly square head sporting small mandibles and short antennae composed of twelve total segments in the females and thirteen segments in the males. From the head across the thorax and down to the pedicel, the exoskeleton has coarse sculpturing, and the fore wings have two cubital cells.

E. rugosus was described from four alate females and one male with Carpenter noting at least forty specimens of the species were known to him. Overall it is estimated the females would have been around 8.0 millimetres (0.31 in) long while the male was smaller at about 7 millimetres (0.28 in). Males are also distinguished by their head, which is broader then it is long, while in females the head is longer than broad.

Unlike E. rugosus, E. striatus was described from only two specimens, an adult worker and an alate female. They are identical in features and only differ in the size of worker, at 6.0 millimetres (0.24 in), while the queen is 8.0 millimetres (0.31 in). E. striatus is noted for having a smaller head with longer antennae segments than E. rugosus, plus a smaller postpetiole and lack of sculpturing on the gaster.
