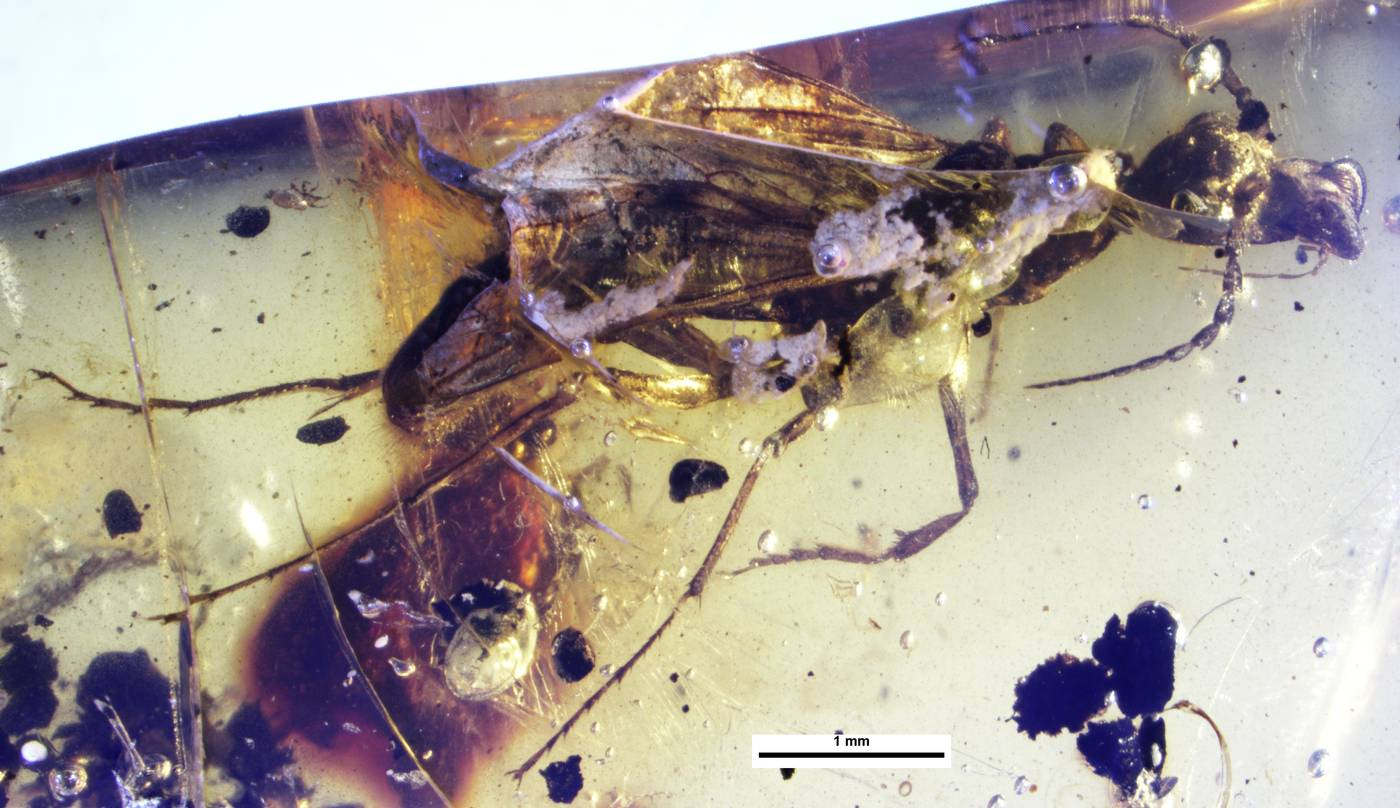
- Camelomecia janovitzi holotype AMNH-BUTJ003

Scientific classification
- Kingdom: Animalia
- Phylum: Arthropoda
- Clade: Pancrustacea
- Class: Insecta
- Order: Hymenoptera
- Family: Formicidae
- Genus: †Camelomecia
- Species: †C. janovitzi

Binomial name
- †Camelomecia janovitzi Barden & Grimaldi, 2016

= Camelomecia =

Camelomecia Temporal range: Earliest Cenomanian

Extinct genus of ants

Camelomecia is an extinct genus of stem-group ants not placed into any Formicidae subfamily and probably not into Formicidae itself. Fossils of the single known species, Camelomecia janovitzi, are known from the Middle Cretaceous of Asia. The genus is one of several ants described from Middle Cretaceous ambers of Myanmar.

== History and naming ==
Camelomecia is known from three total adult fossils, the holotype, specimen number "AMNH Bu-TJ003", and two additional fragmentary adults not designated as paratypes. At the time of the genus description, the three specimens were residing in the American Museum of Natural History, in New York City. The described specimens are of queen and drone caste adults which have been preserved as inclusions in transparent chunks of Burmese amber. The amber specimens were recovered from deposits in Kachin State, in Myanmar. Burmese amber has been radiometrically dated using U-Pb isotopes, yielding an age of approximately 98.79 ± 0.62 million years old, close to the Aptian – Cenomanian boundary, in the earliest Cenomanian.

The fossils were first studied by paleoentomologists Philip Barden and David Grimaldi, both of the American Museum of Natural History. Barden and Grimaldi's 2016 type description of the new genus and species was published in the journal Current Biology. The genus name Camelomecia was coined as a combination of the suffix "mecia" which is commonly used in ant genus names, and camel, in reference to the head when viewed from the side. The specific epithet janovitzi is a patronym honoring Tyler Janovitz who donated the type specimen for study. Camelomecia is one of several ant genera described from Burmese amber the others being Burmomyrma, Ceratomyrmex, Gerontoformica, Haidomyrmex, Myanmyrma, and Zigrasimecia.

== Phylogeny ==
A phylogeny of stem group ants in relation to wasps and crown group ants was produced by Barden and Grimaldi in 2016. The phylogeny placed Camelomecia as a stem group genus of Formicidae, with no mention of a specific subfamily, rather leaving the genus as incertae sedis. The genus was recovered as close to both Sphecomyrma and Zigrasimecia which are both members of the subfamily Sphecomyrmicinae.

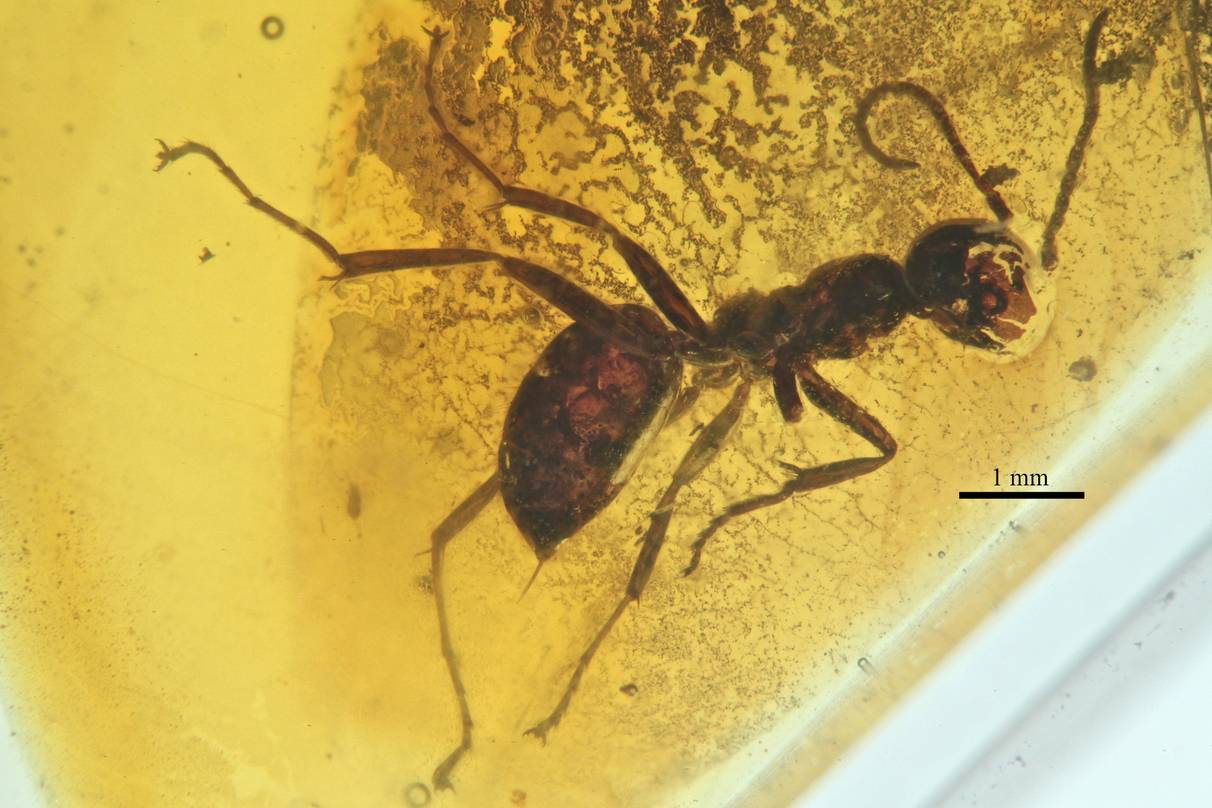
Sphecomyrma freyi

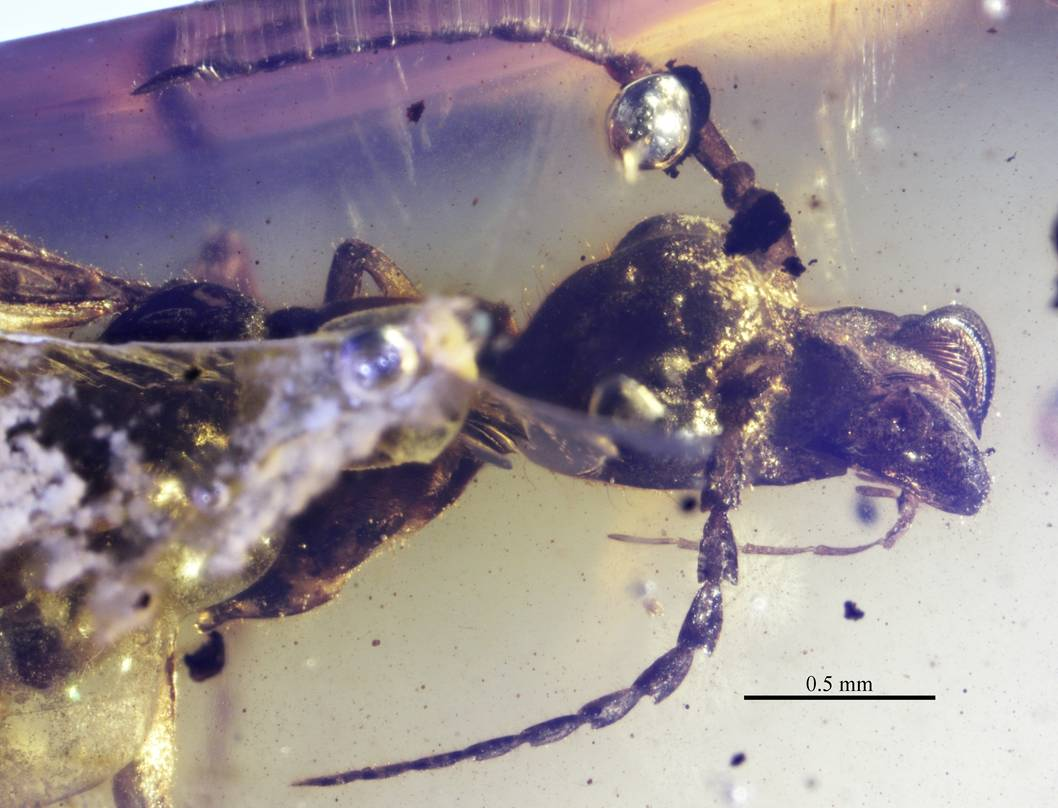
C. janovitzi profile

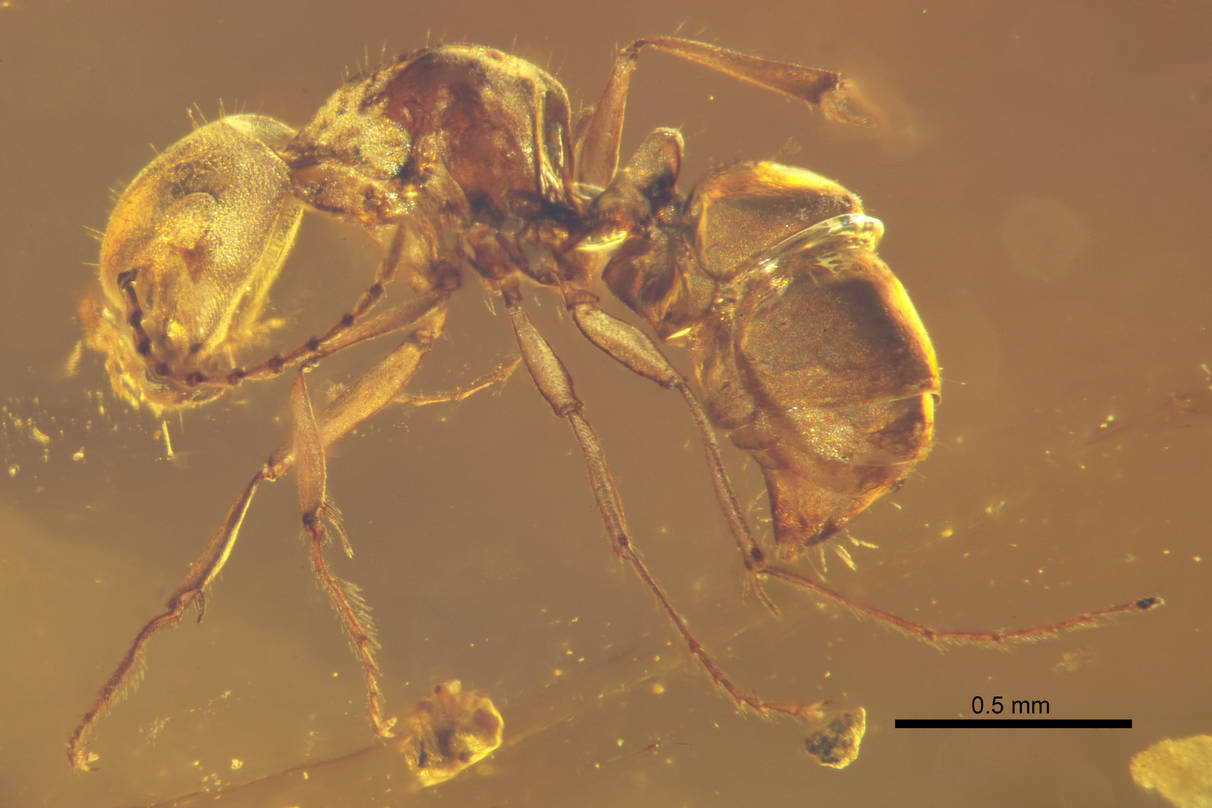
Zigrasimecia ferox

- Hymenoptera
  - Bradynobaenidae + Apoidea
    - Chyphotes mellipes
    - - Chalybion californicum
      - Heterogyna species
  - Formicidae
    - Haidomyrmecines
      - Haidomyrmodes mammuthus
      - - Haidomyrmex scimitarus
        - Haidoterminus cippus
    - - Sphecomyrma freyi
      - Camelomecia janovitzi
      - - Myanmyrma gracilis
        - Zigrasimecia ferox
      - - Gerontoformica spiralis
        - Gerontoformica magnus
        - Gerontoformica gracilis
        - Gerontoformica pilosus
      - - Brownimecia clavata
        - Crown Group ants

In 2020, Camelomecia and two species of the mid-Cretaceous genus Camelosphecia were placed in a clade that lies outside of the Formicidae and forms the larger group Formicoidea with it.

== Descriptions ==
Camelomecia has an elongated head which flares out from the base area of the compound eyes and antennae sockets to the rear of the head capsule, which is gently rounded at the tip. Occeli placed located on a ridge of raised cuticle, between the elliptical shaped compound eyes. The twelve segmented antennae are approximately 3.79 millimetres (0.149 in) long, and have a notably short scape. Of the segments, antennomeres four through eleven have small bases and widen unequally to the tops. The upper edges of the antennomeres have a point on the upper inner sides, giving the antennae a slightly serrate appearance. The mandibles have a distinct cup-like appearance, with the inner side of each cup towards the clypeal surface and a single tooth is present on the lower apex. The front of the inner margins on the mandibles each have a row of thick setae while rows of denticles run along the dorsoventral edge. The modified labrum has a rounded, tongue like look extending between the mandibles. On each of the side edges of the labrum are a row of forward facing setae, while the front edge has many dense setae. The maxillary palps are composed of five segments and the labial palps are composed of three segments. The metapleural gland has a small slit like opening that has between three and four small setae on lower edge. The wings of the holotype are damaged and little is visible of the vein structure. The front edge of the propodium has a collar like ring of hairs. The gaster is attached to the petiole with a broad connection on the second metasomal segment, while the petiole is generally stalk shaped. A sting is present and partly extended from the gaster tip.

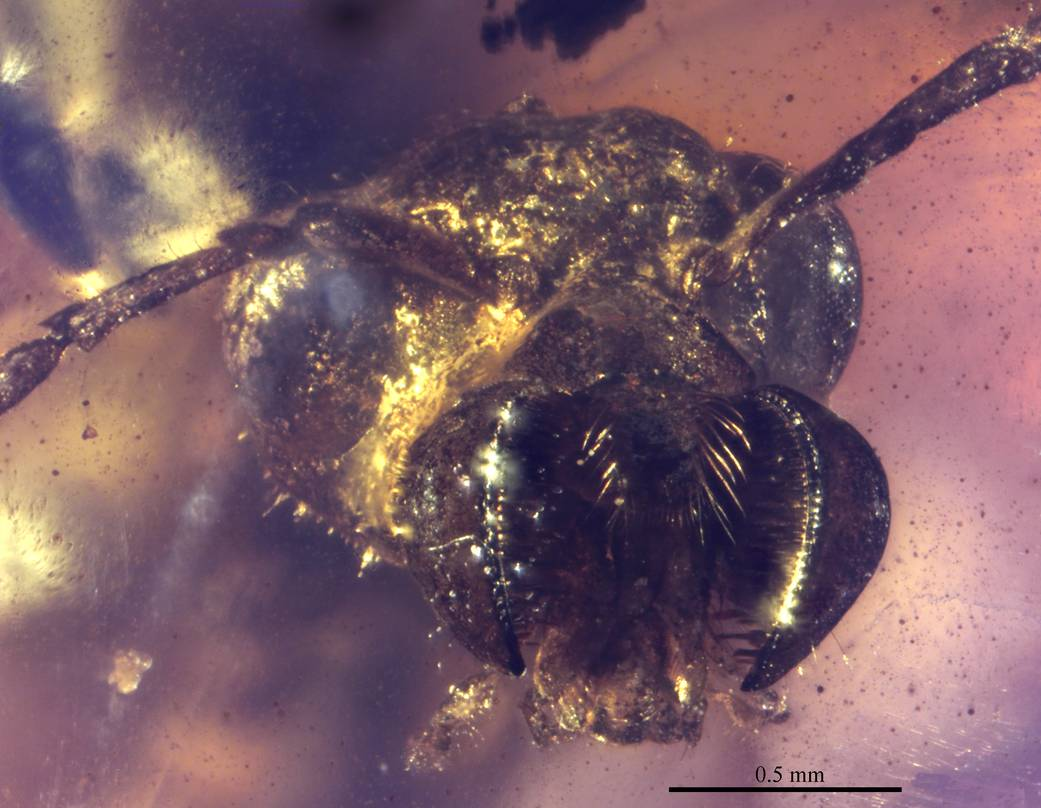
C. janovitzi mandibles, labrum, and denticles

Similar to the C. janovitzi gyne is the Camelomecia species gyne described, but the mandibles are slightly more elongated than the holotype gyne. Additionally the labrum has fewer setae on the lateral and frontal edges, and the side edges are darkened and clypeus has a rear margin that spans the full width of the head with the face being flattened dorsally. The propodium has a flat face on the back side and small spines, in contrast to the C. janovitzi gyne, which has a rounded propodium with a flattened front face. Due to the differences the specimen was assigned to Camelomecia, but not placed into C. janovitzi or a new species.

An 8.5 mm (0.33 in) winged male was described as a possible Camelomecia specimen based on the similarities in wing veination and mandible structures. The wings are shortened, the forewings being about 4.96 mm (0.195 in) and the hindwings 3.96 mm (0.156 in). There are a total of fourteen hamuli on the hindwings, all but one located towards the wing tip, with the last just to the base side of the Rs vein. The forewings have a very large parallelogram shaped DC cell and a DC2 cell, which is not seen in wings of Sphecomyrma or Gerontoformica species. Unlike the described Camelomecia females, the male has only eleven antennae segments, and the clypeus lacks denticles, rather a brush of fine setae is present. The gaster has preserved and distinct conical male genitalia.
