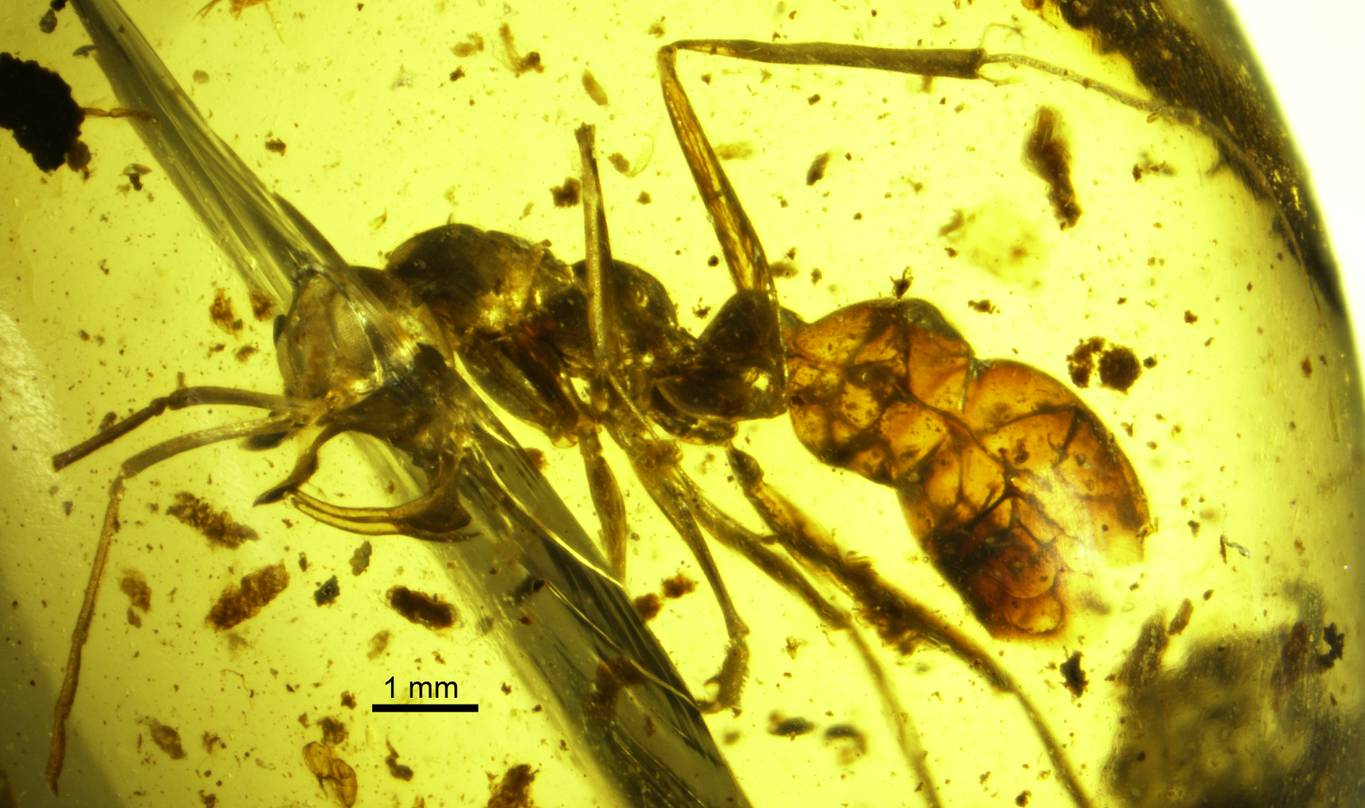
- Linguamyrmex vladi Holotype worker

Scientific classification
- Domain: Eukaryota
- Kingdom: Animalia
- Phylum: Arthropoda
- Class: Insecta
- Order: Hymenoptera
- Family: Formicidae
- Subfamily: †Haidomyrmecinae
- Genus: †Linguamyrmex; Barden & Grimaldi, 2017

Species
- L. brevicornis Perrichot et al. 2020; L. rhinocerus Miao & Wang, 2019; L. vladi Barden & Grimaldi, 2017

= Linguamyrmex =

Linguamyrmex Temporal range: Early Cenomanian

Extinct genus of ants

Linguamyrmex is an extinct genus of ant in the formicid subfamily Haidomyrmecinae, and is one of only nine genera placed in the subfamily Haidomyrmecinae. The genus contains three described species, Linguamyrmex brevicornis, Linguamyrmex rhinocerus, and the type species Linguamyrmex vladi all known from Late Cretaceous fossils found in Asia.

== History and classification ==
Linguamyrmex is known from a total of four adult fossils. The holotype is specimen number "AMNH BuPH-01" from the American Museum of Natural History; the other three specimens described are also in the same collection, but were not placed as members of L. vladi. The described specimens are of worker caste adults which have been preserved as inclusions in transparent chunks of Burmese amber. The amber specimens were recovered from deposits in Kachin State, in Myanmar. Burmese amber has been radiometrically dated using U-Pb isotopes, yielding an age of approximately 98.79 ± 0.62 million years old, close to the Albian – Cenomanian boundary, in the earliest Cenomanian.

The fossils were first studied by paleoentomologists Phillip Barden and David Grimaldi with their 2017 type description of the new genus and species being published in the journal Systematic Entomology. The genus name Linguamyrmex was formed as a combination of the Greek "myrmex" which means ant, and the Latin "lingua", which means tongue, as a reference to the shape and appearance of the clypeal projection. The specific epithet vladi is a patronym honoring Vlad III, known as Vlad the Impaler, who was the ruler of Wallachia. It was coined as a reference to both Vlad's preferred execution style and for his inspiration of Bram Stoker's Count Dracula, who drank blood.

The three remaining workers studied, BuPH-02, BuPH-03, and BuPH-04 were assigned to Linguamyrmex due to several factors. Each of the specimens is incomplete, all missing portions of the antennae, making comparison of the scape length to the other segments impossible, and all specimens are missing the terminal segments of the gaster. Based on the worker size and on paddle composition Barden and Grimaldi suggest the three workers may belong to undescribed species.

Linguamyrmex is one of several ant genera described from Burmese amber, the others being Burmomyrma, Camelomecia, Ceratomyrmex, Gerontoformica, Haidomyrmex, Myanmyrma, and Zigrasimecia. Linguamyrmex is one of five genera in Haidomyrmecini, the other four being Ceratomyrmex, Haidomyrmex, Haidomyrmodes and Haidoterminus. The genus is distinguished from them by the well developed gasteral constriction on the abdomen, a feature only seen, to a lesser degree, in Haidomyrmodes mammuthus. Additionally Linguamyrmex has an enlarged and paddle shaped clypeus, similar to the extremely modified clypeus of Ceratomyrmex, but which is smooth along the stalk instead of sporting setae, and with trigger hairs placed at the base of the setae pad on the paddle instead of at the base of the paddle stalk.

== Behavior and ecology ==
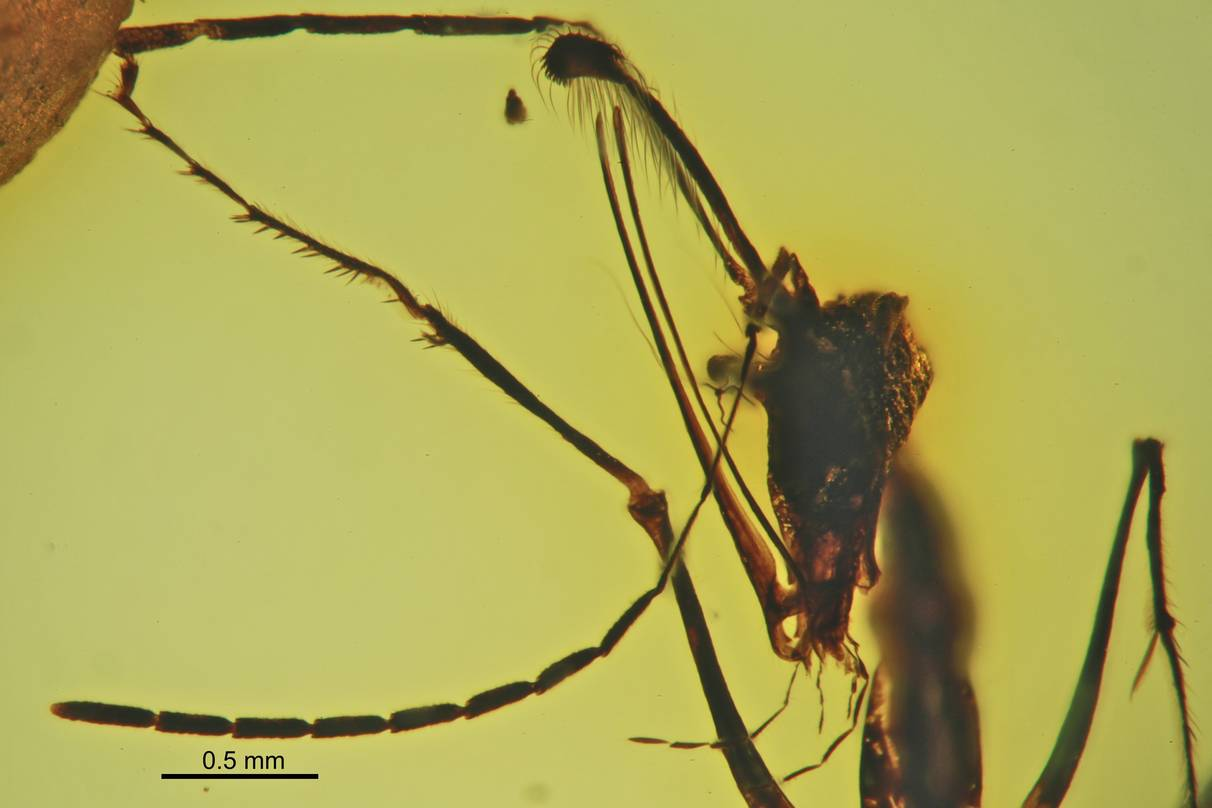
Ceratomyrmex ellenbergeri head

As with all haidomyrmecine members, the head structure of Linguamyrmex is interpreted to facilitate trap-jaw behavior, as is seen in modern specialized genera of Formicinae, Myrmicinae and Ponerinae. In haidomyrmecines the clypeus is modified to span from near the oral opening up past the mandibles to near the vertex of the head, the only ant group with such a modification. Along with the clypeal structuring a pair of long setae are positioned in the path of the mandibles. In modern trap-jaw ants such setae are used as triggers that initiate the rapid closure of the mandibles, often to capture prey or sometimes in a defensive action. The upper areas of the clypeus are always coated in a brush of stout setae in the region where the mandibles came to rest when triggered to close. Based on the modification of the clypeus, it is probable that Linguamyrmex would have captured prey from the front, other strategies being made improbable due to the upward motion of the mandibles. In haidomyrmecines with highly modified cleypeal areas, such as Linguamyrmex and Ceratomyrmex the horn probably served as a pinning or trapping point for the mandibles with captured prey.

This hypothesis for the purpose of the clypeus in Linguamyrmex is further supported by data obtained from X-ray micro-computed tomography scans of specimen "BuPH-03". Scanning of the specimen shows density variation in the paddle, with the outer edges less dense than the central core area on the paddles underside. This indicates the paddle was strengthened with thickened cuticle or with metals sequestering in the cuticle, the latter being more likely from the distinct contrast shown in the x-ray. The location of the highest density is near the center of the paddle at the point of impact for the mandibles when they closed, likely to help brace the paddle against misfires of the mandibles, or impact through soft bodied prey, such as beetle larvae. Metals such as calcium, iron, manganese, and zinc are used by insects in both mandibles and ovipositors to reduce wear and increase durability.

== Description ==
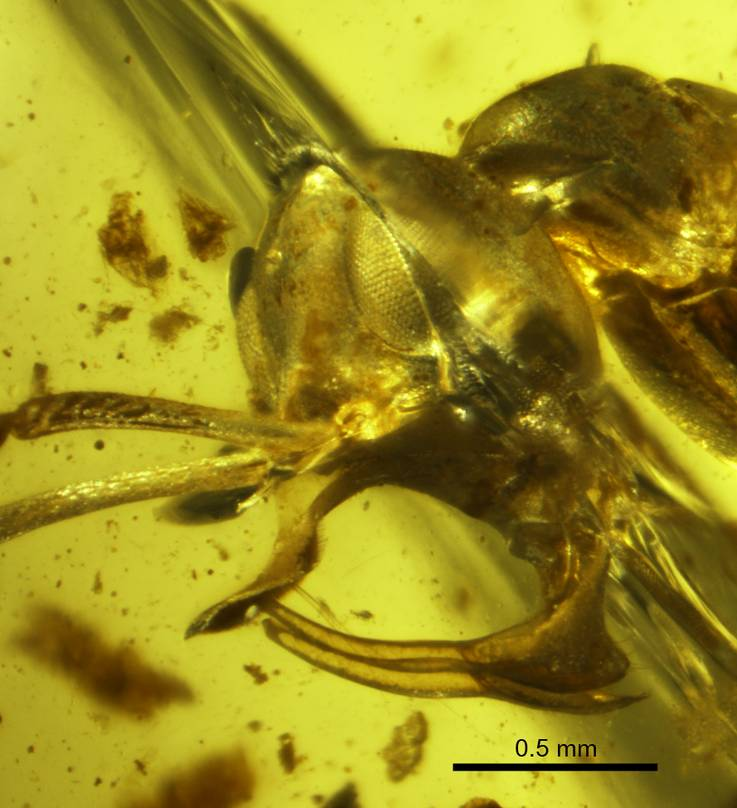
Head of the holotype worker

The head of the Linguamyrmex holotype measures 1.86 mm (0.07 in) from the front edge of the clypeus to the rear of the head at the occipital foramen, which is placed high on the back side, near the vertex. There are three ocelli placed just to the front of the vertex, and the bulging ovoid compound eyes are positioned high on the head capsule. The antennae are not fully preserved, with only three full segments, the scape, pedicel, and flagellomere I. The antennae insertion is just in front of and below the eyes, positioned in depressions on each side of the frontal triangle. The frontal triangle extends down from the vertex and merges with the base of the clypeal horn, which is reinforced with clear membrane-like cuticle. The clypeus is enlarged and modified into a paddle shaped horn that has a pad of setae on the underside. The stalk of the horn is smooth, with no setae, and the trigger hairs seen in haidomyrmecines sprout from near the base of the setae pad on the paddle. The pad is composed of long fine setae around the edges changing to shorter thicker setae in the center. The mandibles scythe shaped in general outline, curving out and upwards from the head towards the clypeal horn. There are expansions near the base of each mandible which angle in towards each other, and which have upper surfaces that are concave and covered with setae pointing towards the mouth.

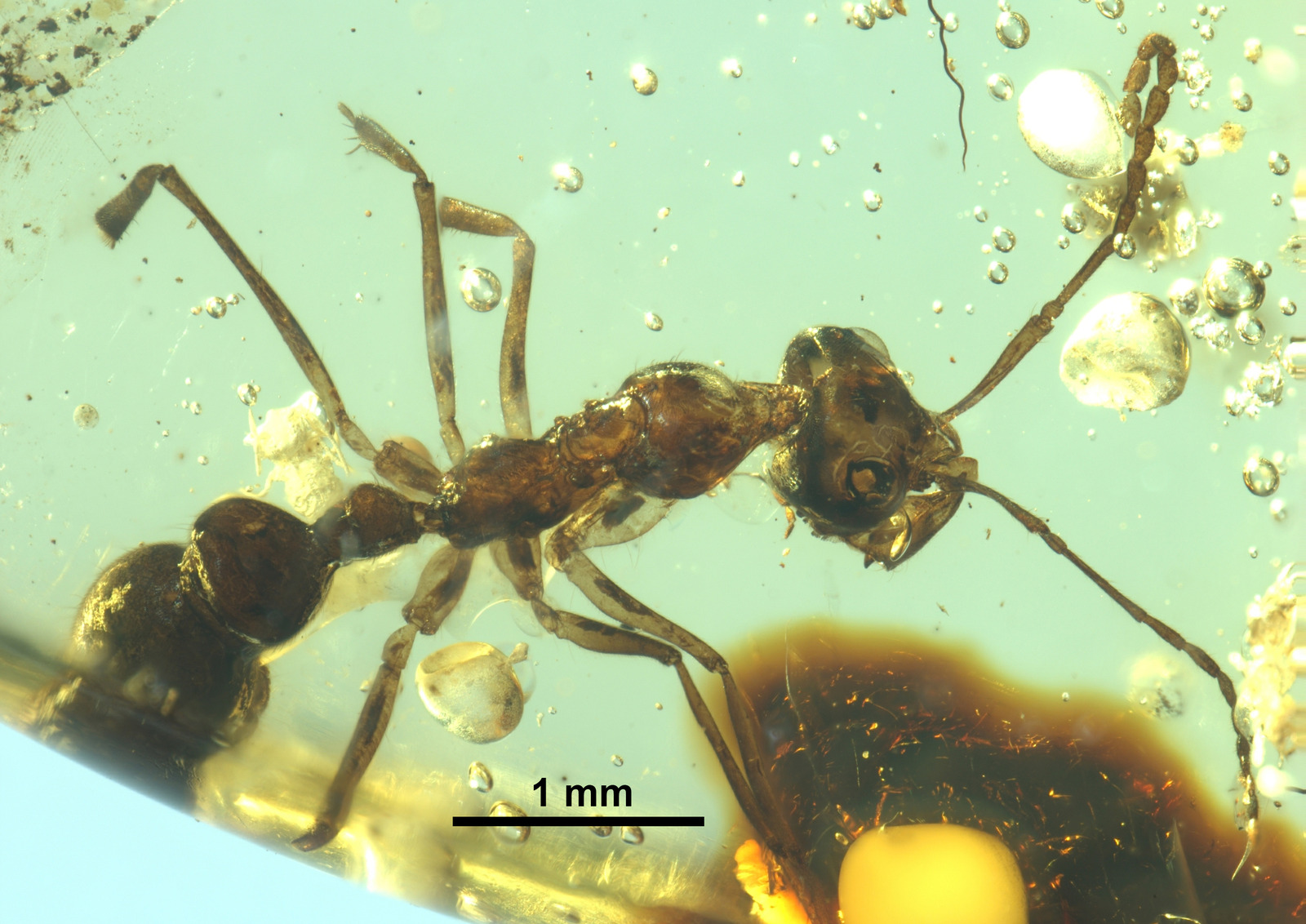
Linguamyrmex brevicornis Dorsal

The mesosoma has a small propleuron that is hidden except where the mesosoma touches the head capsule, while the pronotum is broad and has a coating of fine setae. To the rear of the mesosoma, the propodeum is gently rounded upper front face that curves to become a shear rear face. Both the propodeal spiracle and metapleural gland are visible on the sides of the mesosoma, with the spiracle elongated into a slit shape, while metapleural gland is a horizontal opening placed rear of a well-developed bulla. The petiole has a gradually sloping front face and rounded upper surface. The rear is broadly attached to gasteral segment I and the distinctly showing helcium is striated. An incomplete fusion line runs along the side of the petiole and gaster, with a thin membranous section present below, while a constriction between segments I and II that rings the full gaster. There is a forward projecting horn on the underside of sternite III that also has distinct striations. The cuticle of the gaster is translucent, which shows that the apodemes of gastral sternites IV and V are expanded and heavily sclerotized.
