= Cananeuretus =

Cananeuretus Temporal range: Campanian

Scientific classification
- Domain: Eukaryota
- Kingdom: Animalia
- Phylum: Arthropoda
- Class: Insecta
- Order: Hymenoptera
- Family: Formicidae
- Subfamily: Aneuretinae (?)
- Genus: †Cananeuretus
- Species: †C. occidentalis

Binomial name
- †Cananeuretus occidentalis Engel & Grimaldi, 2005

Genus of ants

Cananeuretus is an extinct genus of ant in the Formicidae subfamily Aneuretinae, and is one of two Cretaceous genera of the subfamily. The genus contains a single described species Cananeuretus occidentalis and is known from one Late Cretaceous fossil which has been found in North America.

== History and classification ==
Cananeuretus is known from an adult fossil, the holotype, specimen number "TMP 8.89.7", and an additional partial worker tentatively assigned to the species. At the time of description, both specimens were residing in the paleontology collections housed at the Royal Tyrell Museum, Drumheller, Alberta. The holotype specimen is composed of a mostly complete worker caste adult female which has been preserved as an inclusion in a transparent chunk of clear yellow Canadian amber. The amber specimen was recovered from deposits of the Foremost Formation near Grassy Lake, Alberta, Canada. Canadian amber has been dated to an age of approximately 79–78 million years old, placing it in the Campanian of the Late Cretaceous. Analysis of the amber composition indicates it originated as cupressaceous resins which were deposited in lagoons and salt water marshes along the Western Interior Seaway.

The fossil was first studied by paleoentomologists Michael Engel and David Grimaldi, both of the American Museum of Natural History. Engel and Grimaldi's 2005 type description of the new genus and species was published in the journal American Museum Novitates. The genus name Cananeuretus was coined as a combination of the genus name "Aneuretus" which is the type genus of the subfamily Aneuretinae, and Canada, in recognition of the country of origin. The specific epithet occidentalis was based from the Latin word meaning from the west, a reference the genus being the first Mesozoic aneuretine found in the Western Hemisphere. Cananeuretus is one of six ant species described from the Grassy Lake site, the others being Canapone dentata, Chronomyrmex medicinehatensis, Eotapinoma macalpini, Haidoterminus cippus, and Sphecomyrma canadensis.

In the type description, Engel and Grimaldi described Cananeuretus as a formicomorph genus based the plesiomorphies that are suggested to define the subfamily Aneuretinae. They excluded the genus from Dolichoderinae, which Eotapinoma belongs to, and separated the two genera based on the well developed sting on Cananeuretus in combination with an apparent lack of acidopore. Cananeuretus is the second Mesozoic genus to tentatively be placed into Aneuretinae, after the slightly older Burmomyrma found in Burmese amber.

== Description ==
Cananeuretus has "primitive" mandibles, each having four distinct teeth present, the basal most being the largest. The compound eyes are small and well developed, being positioned low on the head making observation on the two described specimens hard, and ocelli are absent from both specimens. The twelve segmented antennae are placed in slightly upward positioned antennae sockets and have an elongated scape. The alitrunk is elongated in nature with a narrowing at the front forming a neck like appearance at the front. There are no lobes or projections on the propodeum, rather it is smoothly rounded. The legs are slim with a developed grove on the femurs forming trochantellus. The fore-legs have a calcar, or enlarged and modified seta, present. There are small brushes of grouped setae on the interior surfaces of both the protibia and probasitarsus. The gaster is attached to the petiole with an elongated and enlarged connection on the second metasomal segment, while the petiole has a node in the middle. A number of large setae are scattered on the upper surface of the gaster and a large sting is present and extended from the gaster tip.
