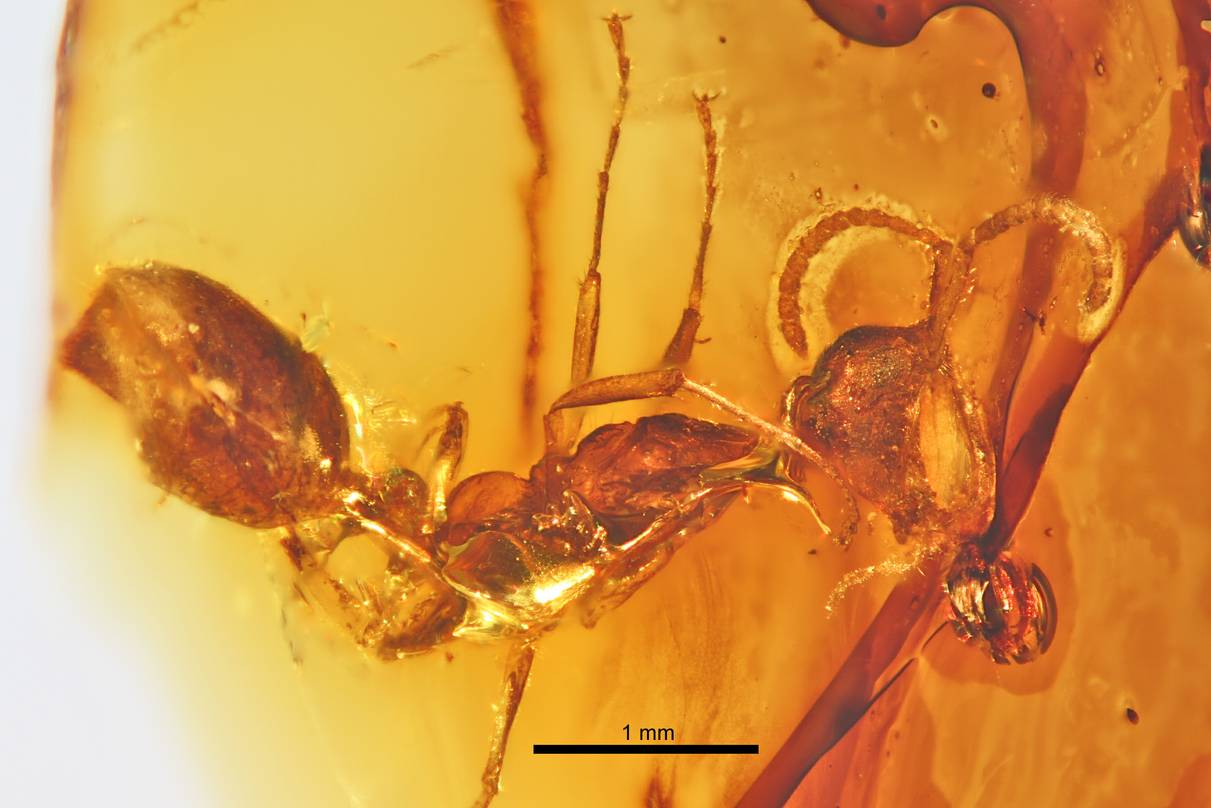
- Haidoterminus cippus holotype

Scientific classification
- Domain: Eukaryota
- Kingdom: Animalia
- Phylum: Arthropoda
- Class: Insecta
- Order: Hymenoptera
- Family: Formicidae
- Subfamily: †Haidomyrmecinae
- Genus: †Haidoterminus; McKellar, Glasier, & Engel, 2013
- Species: †H. cippus

Binomial name
- †Haidoterminus cippus McKellar, Glasier, & Engel, 2013

= Haidoterminus =

Haidoterminus Temporal range: Campanian

Extinct genus of ants

Haidoterminus is an extinct genus of ant in the Formicidae subfamily Haidomyrmecinae, and is one of only nine genera placed in this subfamily. The genus contains a single described species Haidoterminus cippus and is known from one Late Cretaceous fossil which has been found in North America.

== History and classification ==
Haidoterminus is known from a solitary adult fossil, the holotype, specimen number "UASM 332546" donated for study by Mark Elaschuk. At the time of description, the specimen was residing in the Strickland Entomology Museum, part of the University of Alberta. The holotype specimen is composed of a mostly complete worker caste adult female which has been preserved as an inclusion in a transparent chunk of clear yellow Canadian amber. The amber specimen was recovered from deposits of the Foremost Formation near Grassy Lake, Alberta, Canada. Canadian amber has been dated to an age of approximately 79–78 million years old, placing it in the Campanian of the Late Cretaceous. Analysis of the amber composition indicates it originated as cupressaceous resins which were deposited in lagoons and salt water marshes along the Western Interior Seaway. Haidoterminus is one of five ant species described from the Grassy Lake site, the others being Sphecomyrma canadensis, Eotapinoma macalpini, Canapone dentata, and Cananeuretus occidentalis.

The fossil was first studied by paleoentomologists Ryan C. McKellar and Michael S. Engel of the University of Kansas, and James R.N. Glasier of the University of Alberta. The team's 2013 type description of the new genus and species was published in the journal Canadian Entomology. The genus name Haidoterminus was coined by them as a combination of Haidomyrmex, the type genus for Haidomyrmecini, and the Latin terminus meaning "end or boundary" in allusion to the genus being the last member of the tribe Haidomyrmecini to live. The specific epithet cippus, from the Latin for "tombstone or pillar", references the clypeal pads' distinct columnar appearance. Haidoterminus is one of five genera in Haidomyrmecini, the other four being Ceratomyrmex, Linguamyrmex, Haidomyrmex, and Haidomyrmodes.

== Description ==
The Haidoterminus holotype worker has a similar structure to species of Haidomyrmex. The mandibles are very large and well developed with a scythe-shaped appearance in side view and notably narrow bases. The holotype is overall approximately 3.2 millimetres (0.13 in) with small oval shaped compound eyes made up of a larger ommatidia in low numbers. The clypeus has a concave structure sporting several larger setae including two long trigger setae. The antennae are distinct in having a total of twelve segments, in contrast to the eleven segments seen in Haidomyrmex and Haidomyrmodes. Haidoterminus has an elongated third antennomere and a bulb shaped terminal flagellomere, while the antennae have an overall coating of short inclined setae.
