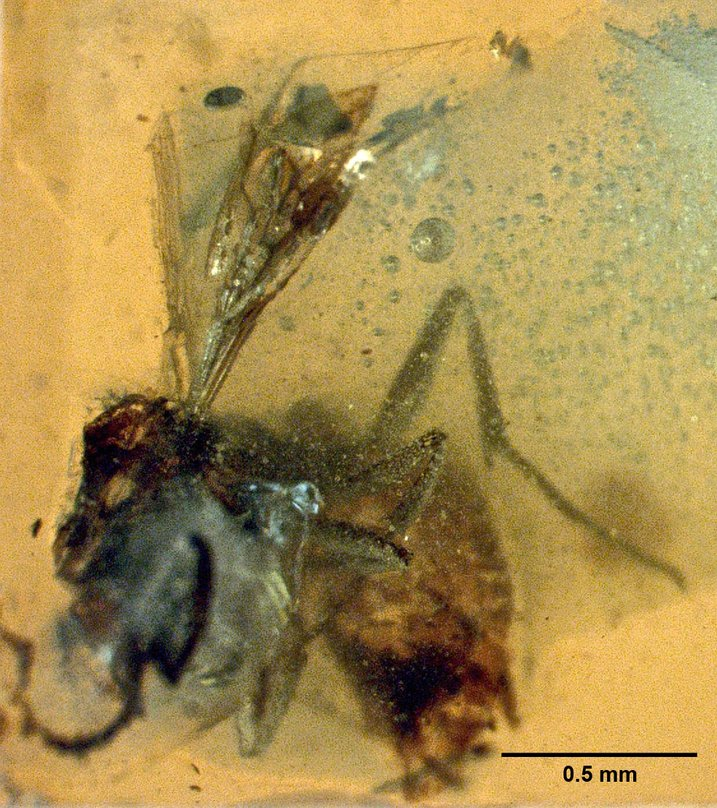
- Haidomyrmodes mammuthus holotype gyne

Scientific classification
- Domain: Eukaryota
- Kingdom: Animalia
- Phylum: Arthropoda
- Class: Insecta
- Order: Hymenoptera
- Family: Formicidae
- Subfamily: †Haidomyrmecinae
- Genus: †Haidomyrmodes; Perrichot et al, 2008
- Species: †H. mammuthus

Binomial name
- †Haidomyrmodes mammuthus Perrichot et al, 2008

= Haidomyrmodes =

Haidomyrmodes Temporal range: Late Albian and Early Cenomanian

Extinct genus of ants

Haidomyrmodes is an extinct genus of ant in the formicid subfamily Haidomyrmecinae, and is one of only nine genera placed in the subfamily Haidomyrmecinae. The genus contains a single described species, Haidomyrmodes mammuthus. Haidomyrmodes is known from several Middle Cretaceous fossils which have been found in Europe.

== History and classification ==
Haidomyrmodes is known from a group of three fossils, the holotype, specimen number "MNHN ARC 50.2", and the paratypes "MNHN ARC 242" and "MNHN AIX 1.2". All three specimens are housed in the fossil collections of the Department of Earth History, Muséum national d'histoire naturelle, Paris, France. The holotype specimen is composed of a mostly complete winged adult female, while the paratypes are both of incomplete worker caste members. All of the specimens are preserved as inclusions in transparent chunks of Late Albian to Early Cenomanian Charentese amber found in the Charente-Maritime area of France.

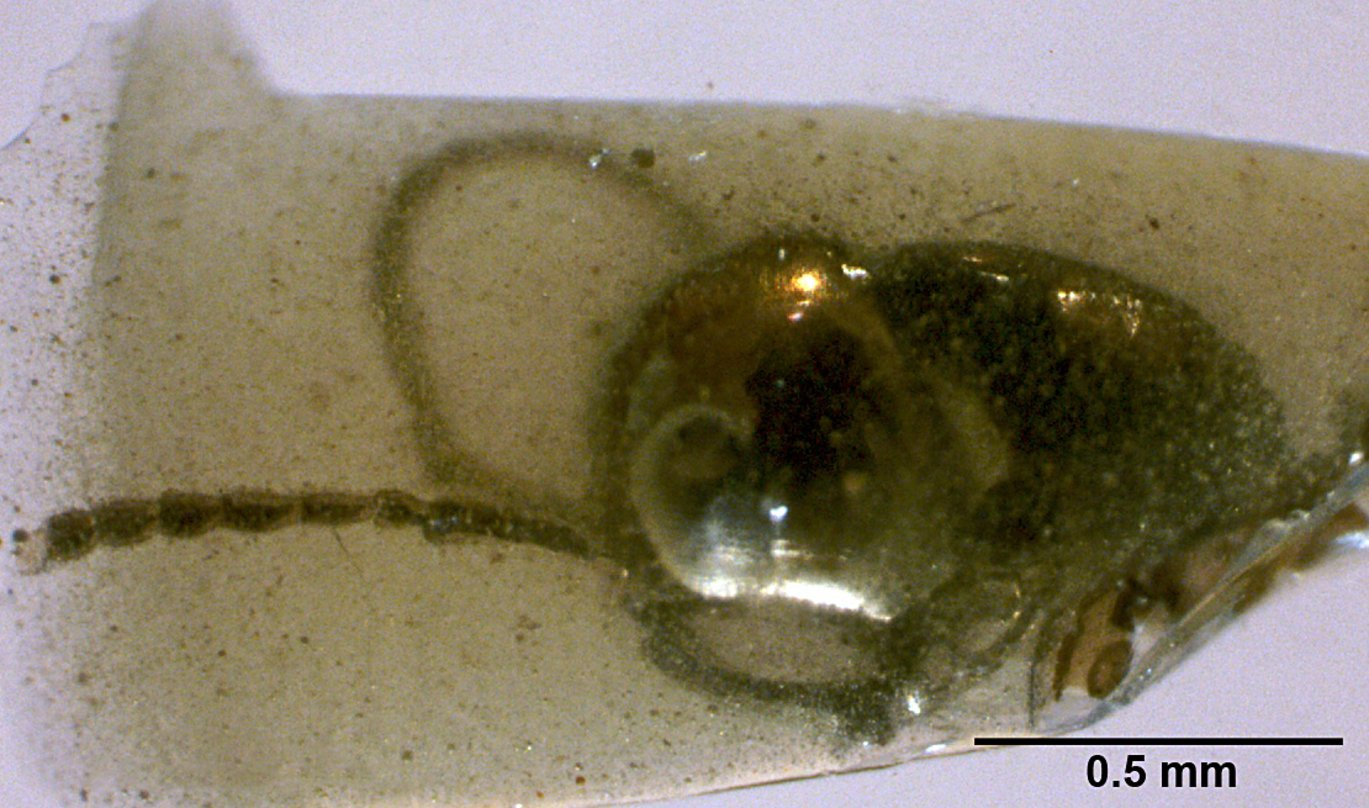
Paratype worker. Specimen #MNHNA30163.

The fossil was first studied by a team of paleoentomologists led by Vincent Perrichot of the Humboldt University of Berlin. The team's 2008 type description of the new genus and species was published in the journal Naturwissenschaften. The genus name Haidomyrmodes was coined by Perrichot et al as a combination of Haidomyrmex, the type genus for Haidomyrmecini, and the suffix -odes meaning "with the form of". The specific epithet mammuthus is a reference to the resemblance between the species' mandibles and the tusks of a mammoth. Haidomyrmodes is one of five genera in Haidomyrmecini, the other four being Ceratomyrmex, Linguamyrmex, Haidomyrmex, and Haidoterminus.

== Description ==
The Haidomyrmodes holotype gyne has a similar structure to species of Haidomyrmex. The mandibles very large and well developed with an L-shaped appearance in side view. In both genera the clypeus has a pair of elongated setae and the genae are elongated. The two genera can be told apart by the placement of the bend in the mandible, with Haidomyrmodes having a more basal bend, and mandibles that are positioned closer to the head when closed. The holotype is overall approximately 3.7 millimetres (0.15 in) with a distinct pair of ocelli and large eyes. The clypeus has a concave structure to it in side view and without and setae. In contrast the two paratype specimens, identified as possible worker caste individuals, differ in the structure from the gyne in several ways. Overall they are smaller than the gyne, and have a basal mandible section shorter than that of the gyne, with two long setae and antennae which are shorter.
