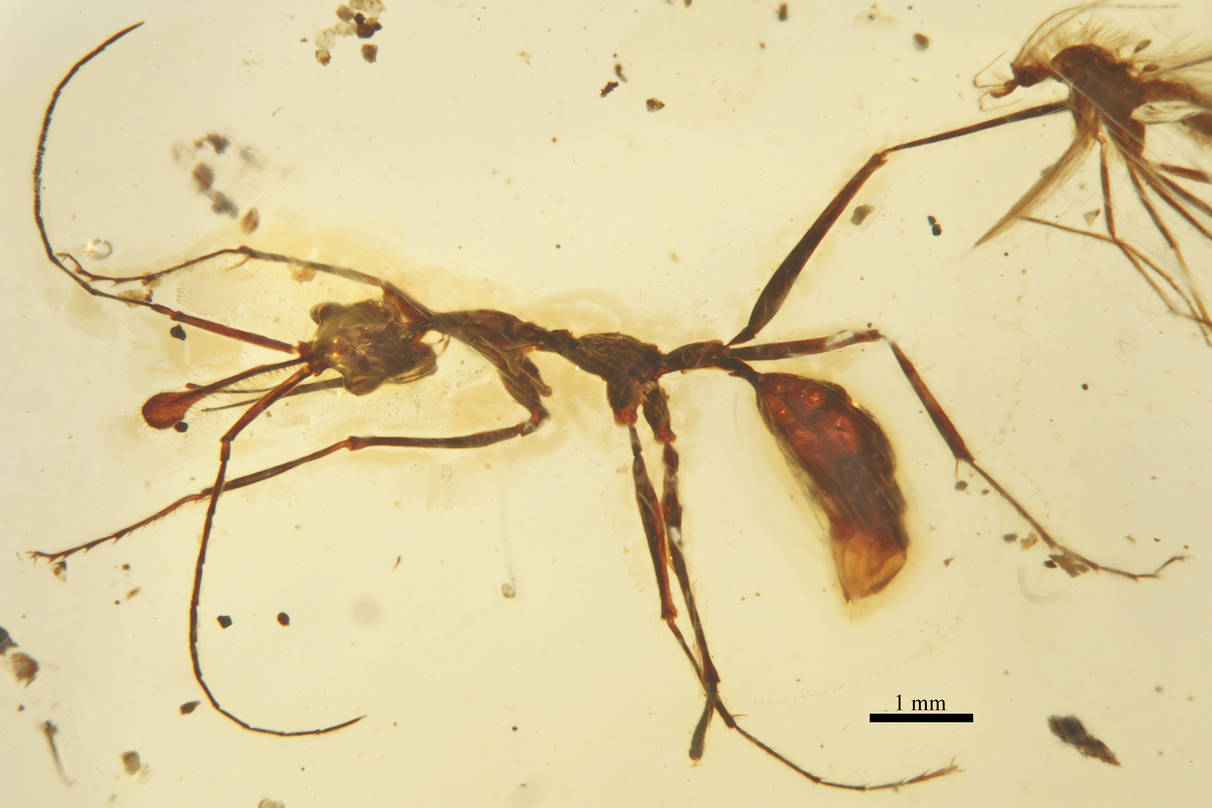
- Holotype worker

Scientific classification
- Domain: Eukaryota
- Kingdom: Animalia
- Phylum: Arthropoda
- Class: Insecta
- Order: Hymenoptera
- Family: Formicidae
- Subfamily: †Haidomyrmecinae
- Genus: †Ceratomyrmex; Perrichot, Wang, & Engel, 2016
- Species: †C. ellenbergeri

Binomial name
- †Ceratomyrmex ellenbergeri Perrichot, Wang, & Engel, 2016

= Ceratomyrmex =

Ceratomyrmex Temporal range: Early Cenomanian

Extinct genus of ants

Ceratomyrmex is an extinct genus of ant in the Formicidae subfamily Haidomyrmecinae. The genus contains a single described species Ceratomyrmex ellenbergeri and is known from several Late Cretaceous fossils which have been found in Asia.

== History and classification ==
Ceratomyrmex is known from a total of four adult fossils. The holotype is specimen number "NIGP164022" of the Nanjing Institute of Geology and Paleontology; the adult specimen "IGR.BU-002" of the University of Rennes is designated as paratype. The two additional specimens described but not designated as paratypes were residing in the private collection of Sieghard Ellenberger, Germany. The described specimens are of worker caste adults which have been preserved as inclusions in transparent chunks of Burmese amber. The amber specimens were recovered from deposits in Kachin State, in Myanmar. Burmese amber has been radiometrically dated using U-Pb isotopes, yielding an age of approximately 98.79 ± 0.62 million years old, close to the Aptian – Cenomanian boundary, in the earliest Cenomanian.

The fossils were first studied by paleoentomologists Vincent Perrichot, Wang Bo and Michael Engel with the group's 2016 type description of the new genus and species being published in the journal Current Biology. The genus name Ceratomyrmex was coined as a combination of the Greek word "myrmex" which means "ant" and is a commonly used root in genus names, and keratos, meaning "horn" in reference to the unique head modification. The specific epithet ellenbergeri is a patronym honoring Sieghard Ellenberger who allowed study of several of the specimens. Ceratomyrmex is one of several ant genera described from Burmese amber, the others being Burmomyrma, Camelomecia, Gerontoformica, Haidomyrmex, Linguamyrmex , Myanmyrma, and Zigrasimecia.

== Biology ==
Perrichot et al. suggested several different functions for the highly specialized mouthparts. Based on the behaviors of modern trap-jaw ant genera such as Odontomachus, Anochetus and Acanthognathus poinari, Perrichot et al. noted that the setae on the horn would provide a soft cushion for moving pupae and larvae in a nest. With the mandibles closed, the trigger hairs are long enough that they could still be tripped. There is the possibility that the jaws could have been used as a defense mechanism, being used to knock predators away or stun prey though a rapid opening of the mandibles. The horn and setae would not be used at all in those maneuvers, so defense was probably not the sole function. While the structure may have been used for moving food and nest materials, the likelihood of that being the only function is low, as the trigger hairs would not be needed then. The most likely use for the horn and mandibles would have been trapping large prey with the setae providing sensory information on the prey position and creating friction to prevent movement. The size of the horn and mandibles makes the capture of small prey unlikely, as the prey would have time to move before the mandibles were fully shut.

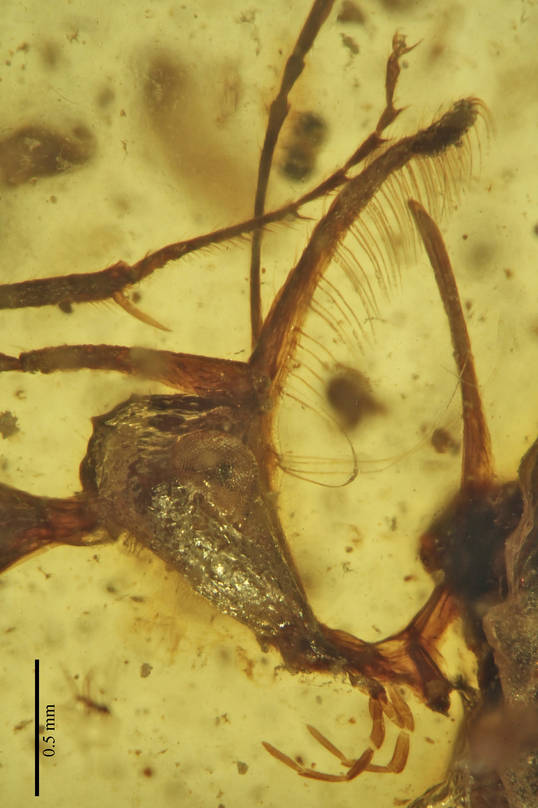
C. ellenbergeri paratype head

== Description ==
The workers of Ceratomyrmex range between approximately 4.5–5.9 mm (0.18–0.23 in) long, while queens and drones were unknown at the time of description. The workers are distinguished from all other haidomyrmecines in the distinctly modified clypeus that forms a horn projecting up from between the bases of the antennae. The horn curves forward with a rounded, spatula like apex. The underside of the horn is covered in a dense arrangement of long setae that trail down from the apex into a single row towards the base. The curve of the spatula also has a grouping of spicules rimming its edges. Like other members of Haidomyrmecini the mandibles of Ceratomyrmex are modified into elongated scythe like shapes. The mandibles are enlarged to reach over the head to the apex of the horn creating a trap-jaw. Near the point where the closed mandibles rest, four very long trigger hairs are placed, with two on each side of the head.
