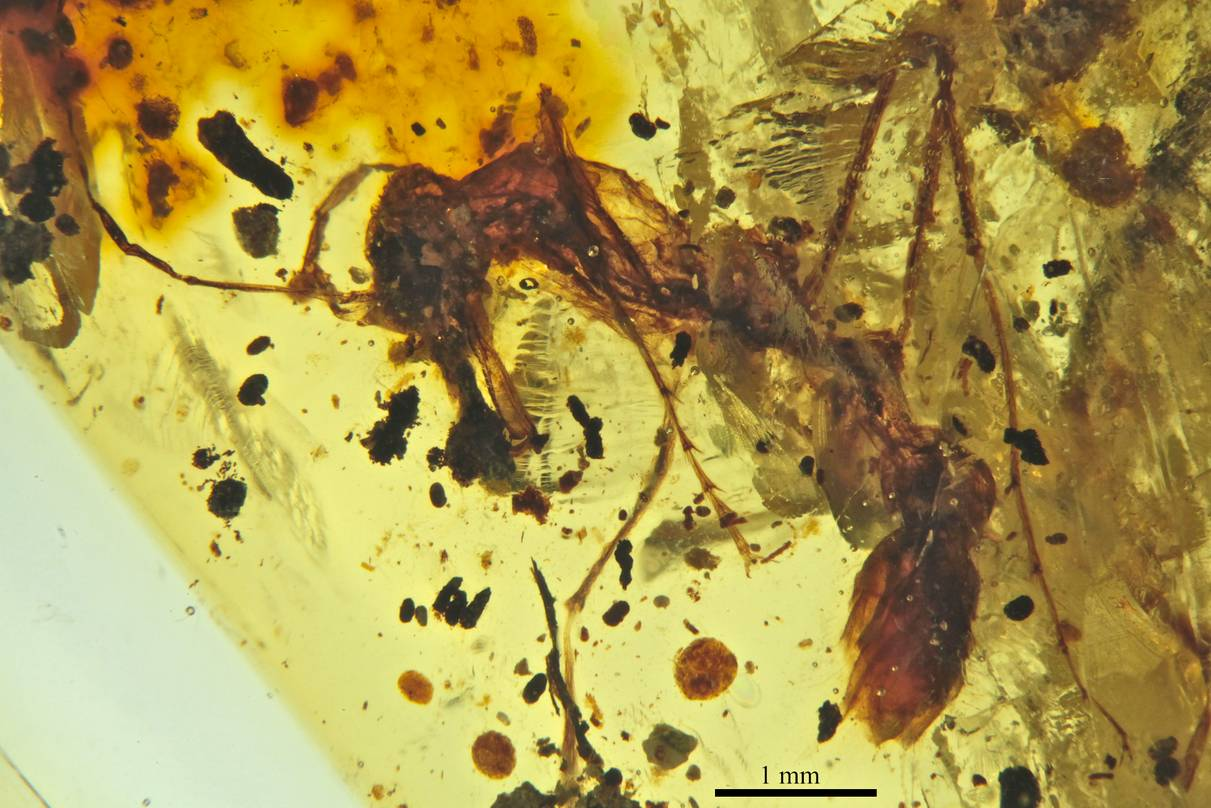
- M. gracilis holotype

Scientific classification
- Kingdom: Animalia
- Phylum: Arthropoda
- Clade: Pancrustacea
- Class: Insecta
- Order: Hymenoptera
- Family: Formicidae
- Subfamily: †Sphecomyrminae
- Genus: †Myanmyrma
- Species: †M. gracilis

Binomial name
- †Myanmyrma gracilis Engel & Grimaldi, 2005

= Myanmyrma =

Myanmyrma Temporal range: Earliest Cenomanian

Extinct genus of ants

Myanmyrma is an extinct genus of ants not placed into any Formicidae subfamily. Fossils of the single known species, Myanmyrma gracilis, are known from the Middle Cretaceous of Asia. The genus is one of several ants described from Middle Cretaceous ambers of Myanmar.

== History and classification ==
Myanmyrma is known from three total adult fossils, the holotype, specimen number "AMNH Bu-014", and two additional fragmentary adults not designated as paratypes. At the time of the genus description, the three specimens were residing in the American Museum of Natural History, in New York City. All the described specimens are of worker caste adult females which have been preserved as inclusions in transparent chunks of Burmese amber. The amber specimen was recovered from deposits in Kachin State, 100 kilometres (62 mi) west of Myitkyina in Myanmar. Burmese amber has been radiometrically dated using U-Pb isotopes, yielding an age of approximately 98.79 ± 0.62 million years old, close to the Aptian – Cenomanian boundary, in the earliest Cenomanian.

The fossil was first studied by paleoentomologists Michael Engel and David Grimaldi, both of the American Museum of Natural History. Engel and Grimaldi's 2005 type description of the new genus and species was published in the journal American Museum Novitates. The genus name Myanmyrma was coined as a combination of the suffix "myrma" which is commonly used in ant genus names, and Myanmar, in recognition of the country of origin. The specific epithet gracilis was based from the Latin word "gracilis" meaning slender, a reference to the elongated nature of the legs and body. Myanmyrma is one of several ant genera described from Burmese amber the others being Burmomyrma, Haidomyrmex, Sphecomyrmodes, and Zigrasimecia.

In the type description, Engel and Grimaldi described Myanmyrma as a poneriod genus based on the constriction of the metasoma, with a possible relationship to either Ponerinae or Myrmeciinae. The large body size and slender nature of the genus was likened to the extant genera Leptomyrmex and Oecophylla which are both arboreal. As such Engel and Grimaldi suggested a similar habitat for Myanmyrma. The myrmeciine affinities were suggested to be unlikely by Archibald, Cover and Moreau in a 2006 paper on fossils of that subfamily. The length of the scape is notably short, a feature seen only in the Cretaceous ant subfamily Sphecomyrminae and the ant family relatives in Armaniidae. The short scape was again noted as a puzzling feature that prevented subfamily placement by Ward in a 2007 paper on the phylogeny of ants.

== Description ==
Myanmyrma has very long mandibles that near the same length as the head. Each mandible has only two large teeth, one blunt subapical, one sharp apical and the right mandible is notably longer than the left. The clypeus is modified with two large lobes, one on each genal margin and having about fourteen denticles. Occeli are not detectable on the holotype, but the presence of them was not ruled out due to the position of the specimen. The twelve segmented antennae are long, being approximately 7.2 millimetres (0.28 in), and have a notably short scape. The second flagellomere is elongated, a trait shared with other Cretaceous ants, possibly due to convergent evolution. The antennae sockets point the antenna nearly vertically off the head and there are several groups of spines on ridges and the frons. The metapleural gland has a small opening which shows on the mesosoma above the rear leg. The gaster is attached to the petiole with a narrow connection on the second metasomal segment, while the petiole is narrow and tall. A large sting is present and partly extended from the gaster tip. The pygidium has a fine covering of setae.
