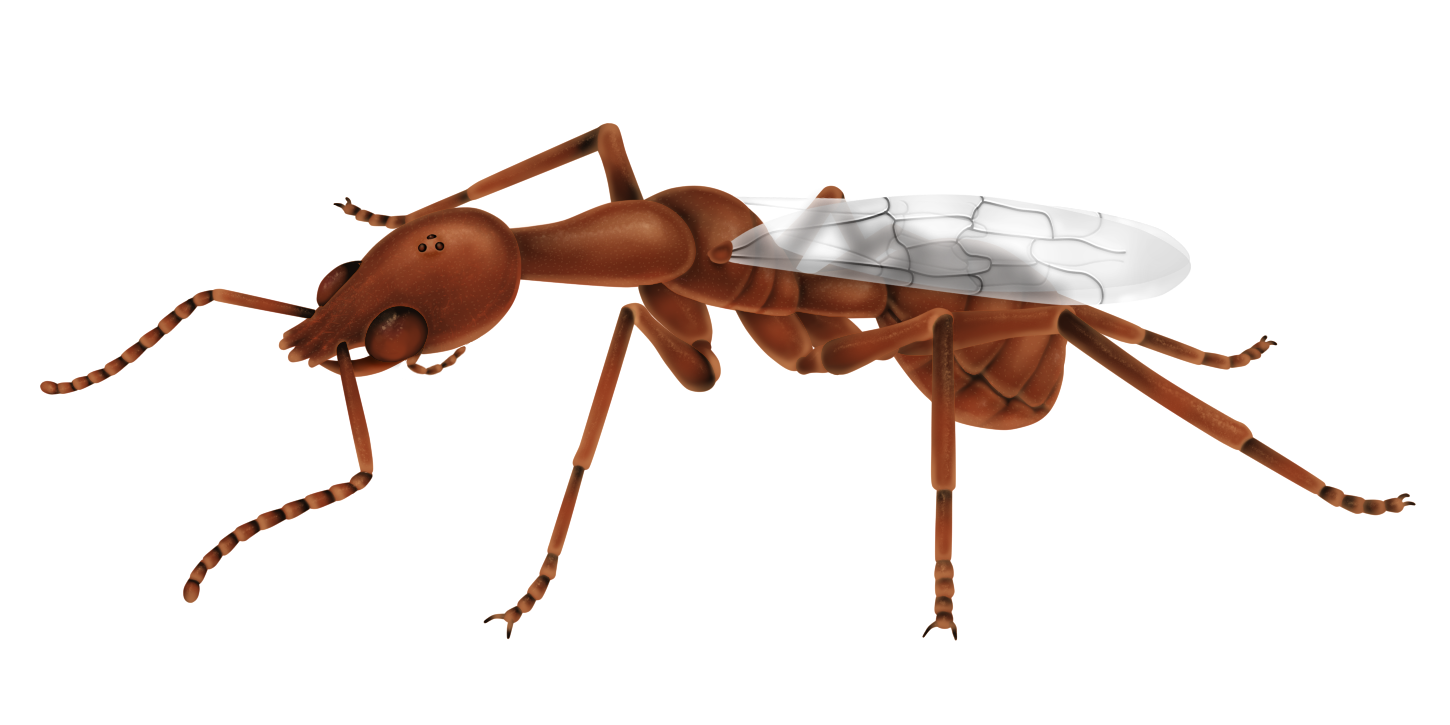
- Life restoration

Scientific classification
- Kingdom: Animalia
- Phylum: Arthropoda
- Clade: Pancrustacea
- Class: Insecta
- Order: Hymenoptera
- Family: Formicidae
- Subfamily: †Haidomyrmecinae
- Genus: †Vulcanidris; Lepeco et al., 2025

Type species
- † Vulcanidris cratensis Lepeco et al., 2025

= Vulcanidris =

Vulcanidris Temporal range: Aptian, 113 Ma

Extinct genus of Brazilian ant

Vulcanidris is an extinct genus of Brazilian ant in the formicid subfamily Haidomyrmecinae, commonly known as "hell ants". It contains a single species, Vulcanidris cratensis. The genus was first discovered in the Crato Formation of Northeastern Brazil, and it represents the oldest verified ant known to science.

== Etymology ==
The name Vulcanidris is in honour of the Vulcano family, which includes Maria Aparecida Vulcano, who has gathered an important Crato collection now bearing her name. The genus also bears the suffix -idris, which is commonly used when naming ant genera and comes from the Greek word ἴδρις (ídris) "knowledgeable". The specific name, V. cratensis, is in reference of the geological formation in which the fossil was found.

== Description ==
The original holotype for the genus, MZSP-CRA-0002, represents a female. It also is the first recorded fossil of a hell ant preserved as a compression fossil in rock, as opposed to amber, allowing for the study of their unique morphology in this medium. Vulcanidris is identified as an hell ant by their characteristic facial projections and mandibular articulation, sharing close resemblance to Aquilomyrmex, although it can be differentiated from it by having a slight constriction in the clypeal projection by the antennal insertion, a forewing with three submarginal cells and a body build less slender than that of Aquilomyrmex.

V. cratensis represents the first known haidomyrmecine from western Gondwana. Since hell ants are thought to be the earliest divergent ant group, the discovery of Vulcanidris sheds light onto their early evolutionary history, their relationship with wasps and pushes their fossil record to 113 Mya, predating formicid fossils in Myanmar and France by more than 13 million years. Another fossil from the same region, Cariridris, has also been thought as one of the earliest ants. However, seeing that the holotype has been inaccessible for decades, a closer examination of its ant classification has not been possible.
