= Plesiomorphy and symplesiomorphy =

Ancestral character or trait state shared by two or more taxa

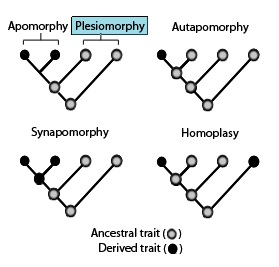
Phylogenies showing the terminology used to describe different patterns of ancestral and derived trait states.

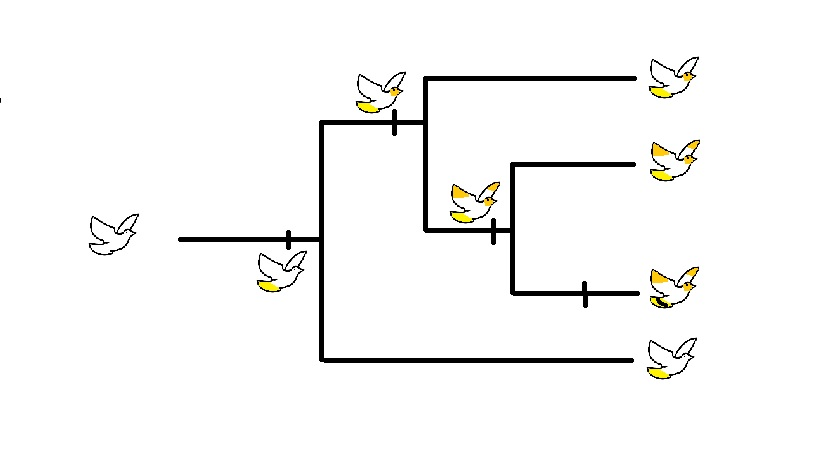
Imaginary cladogram. The yellow mask is a plesiomorphy for each living masked species, because it is ancestral. It is also a symplesiomorphy for them. But for the four living species as a whole, it is an apomorphy because it is not ancestral for all of them. The yellow tail is a plesiomorphy and symplesiomorphy for all living species.

In phylogenetics, a plesiomorphy ("near form") and symplesiomorphy are synonyms for an ancestral character shared by all members of a clade, which does not distinguish the clade from other clades.

Plesiomorphy, symplesiomorphy, apomorphy, and synapomorphy all mean a trait shared between species because they share an ancestral species. (Note: For a dissenting view, see "About nothing" by Brower and de Pinna 2014.)

Apomorphic and synapomorphic characteristics convey information about evolutionary clades and can be used to define taxa. However, plesiomorphic and symplesiomorphic characteristics cannot.

The term symplesiomorphy was introduced in 1950 by German entomologist Willi Hennig.

== Examples ==
A backbone is a plesiomorphic trait shared by birds and mammals, and does not help in placing an animal in one or the other of these two clades. Birds and mammals share this trait because both clades are descended from the same far distant ancestor. Other clades, such as snakes, lizards, turtles, and frogs, all have backbones and none are either birds or mammals.

Being a hexapod is plesiomorphic trait shared by ants and beetles, and does not help in placing an animal in one or the other of these two clades. Ants and beetles share this trait because both clades are descended from the same far distant ancestor. Other clades, e.g. bugs, flies, bees, aphids, and many more clades, all are hexapods and none are either ants nor beetles.

Elytra are a synapomorphy for placing any living species into the beetle clade, Elytra are plesiomorphic between clades of beetles, e.g. they do not distinguish the dung beetles from the horned beetles. The metapleural gland is a synapomorphy for placing any living species into the ant clade.

Feathers are a synapomorphy for placing any living species into the bird clade, hair is a synapomorphy for placing any living species into the mammal clade. Note that some mammal species have lost their hair, so the absence of hair does not exclude a species from being a mammal. Another mammalian synapomorphy is milk. All mammals produce milk and no other clade contains animals which produce milk. Feathers and milk are also apomorphies.

== Discussion ==
All of these terms are by definition relative, in that a trait can be a plesiomorphy in one context and an apomorphy in another, e.g. having a backbone is plesiomorphic between birds and mammals, but is apomorphic between them and insects. That is birds and mammals are vertebrates for which the backbone is a defining synapomorphic characteristic, while insects are invertebrates for which the absence of a backbone is a defining characteristic.

Species should not be grouped purely by morphologic or genetic similarity. Because a plesiomorphic character inherited from a common ancestor can appear anywhere in a phylogenetic tree, its presence does not reveal anything about the relationships within the tree. Thus grouping species requires distinguishing ancestral from derived character states.

An example is thermo-regulation in Sauropsida, which is the clade containing the lizards, turtles, crocodiles, and birds. Lizards, turtles, and crocodiles are ectothermic (coldblooded), while birds are endothermic (warmblooded). Being coldblooded is symplesiomorphic for lizards, turtles, and crocodiles, but they do not form a clade, as crocodiles are more closely related to birds than to lizards and turtles. Thus using coldbloodedness as an apomorphic trait to group crocodiles with lizards and turtles would be an error, and thus it is a plesiomorphic trait shared by these three clades due to their distant common ancestry.

== See also ==
- Apomorphy
- Autapomorphy
- Cladistics
- Synapomorphy
