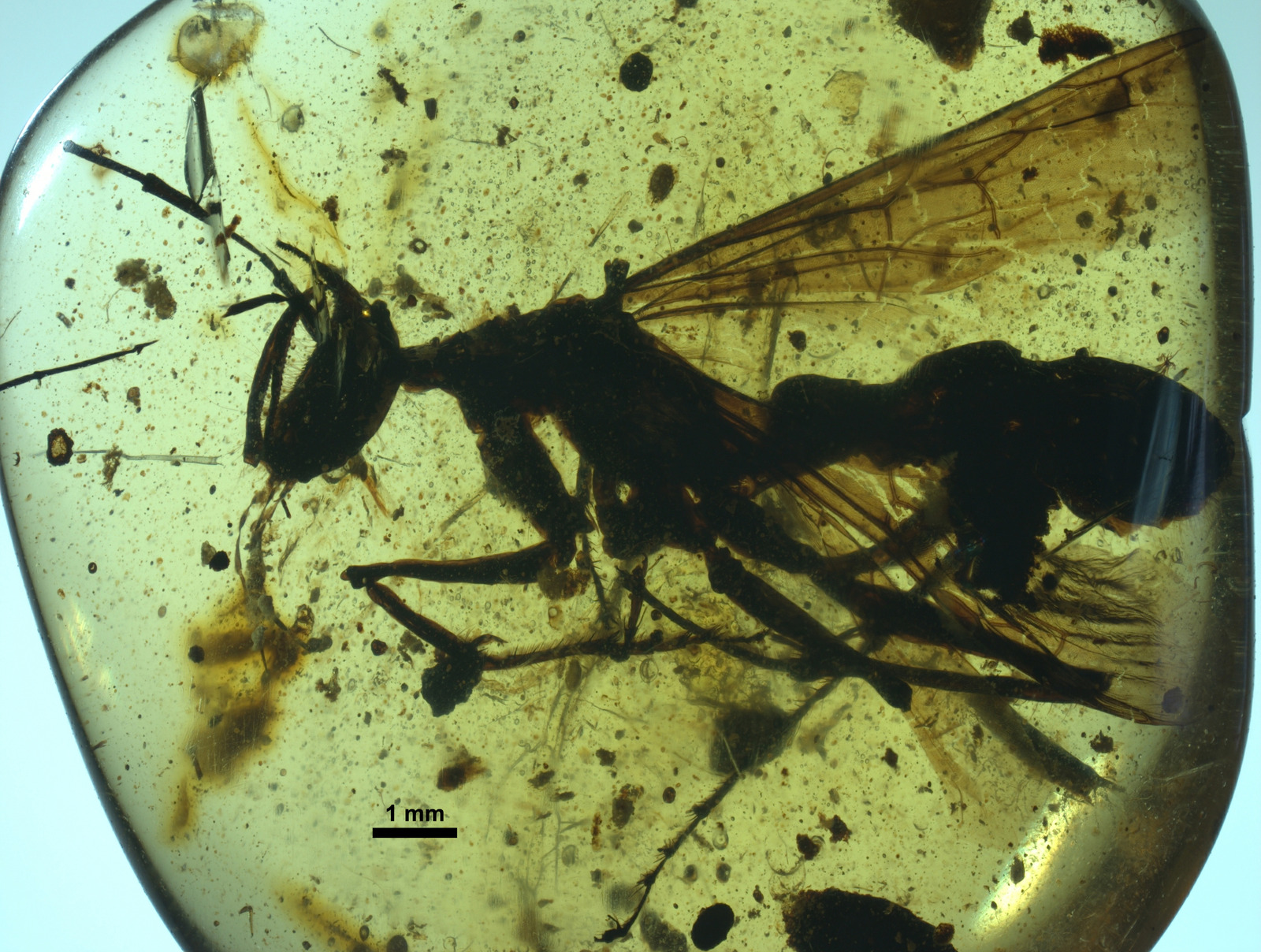
- Dhagnathos autokrator

Scientific classification
- Kingdom: Animalia
- Phylum: Arthropoda
- Clade: Pancrustacea
- Class: Insecta
- Order: Hymenoptera
- Family: Formicidae
- Subfamily: †Haidomyrmecinae; Bolton, 2003

Type genus
- †Haidomyrmex Dlussky, 1996

Genera
- See text

Synonyms
- Haidomyrmecini

= Haidomyrmecinae =

Haidomyrmecinae Temporal range: Late Aptian - Campanian 113–79 Ma

Extinct subfamily of ants

Haidomyrmecinae, occasionally called hell ants, are an extinct subfamily of ants (Formicidae) known from Cretaceous fossils primarily found in amber from North America, South America, Europe, and Asia, spanning the late Aptian to Campanian, around 113 to 79 million years ago. The subfamily was first proposed in 2003 but had been subsequently treated as the tribe Haidomyrmecini and placed in the extinct ant subfamily Sphecomyrminae. Reevaluation of the Haidomyrmecini in 2020 led to the elevation of the group back to the subfamily. The family contains eleven genera and fifteen species.

Members of this family are highly distinct from all other ants, having diverse head ornamentation, and unusually shaped, extended mandibles that are articulated vertically rather than horizontally as in modern ants. The jaws in combination with the head ornamentation served to restrain prey, with most species having setae (hair-like structures) covering parts of the head, which likely functioned as triggers to rapidly close the jaw when disturbed, similar to those of modern trap-jaw ants. Fossils indicate that haidomyrmecines were able to take prey solitarily. Like modern ants, they were eusocial, with distinct worker and queen castes, likely with relatively small colony sizes. Due to their lack of metabolic stores, the queens likely engaged in hunting during the initial foundation of the nest. Haidomyrmecines are thought to be amongst the most basal and earliest diverging group of ants known.

== Ecology ==
They were ambush predators that lived on the forest floor

== Genera ==
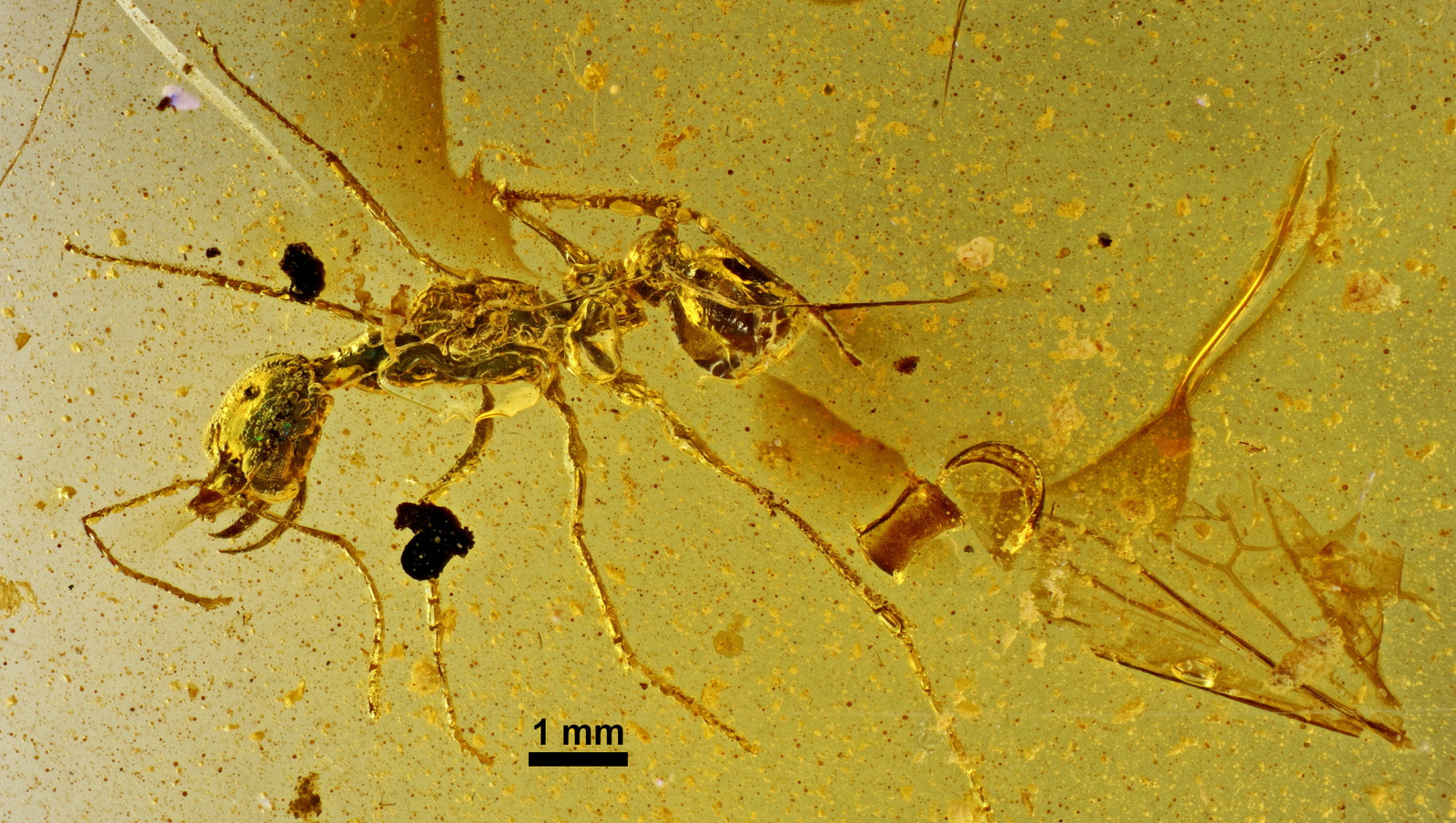
Aquilomyrmex huangi

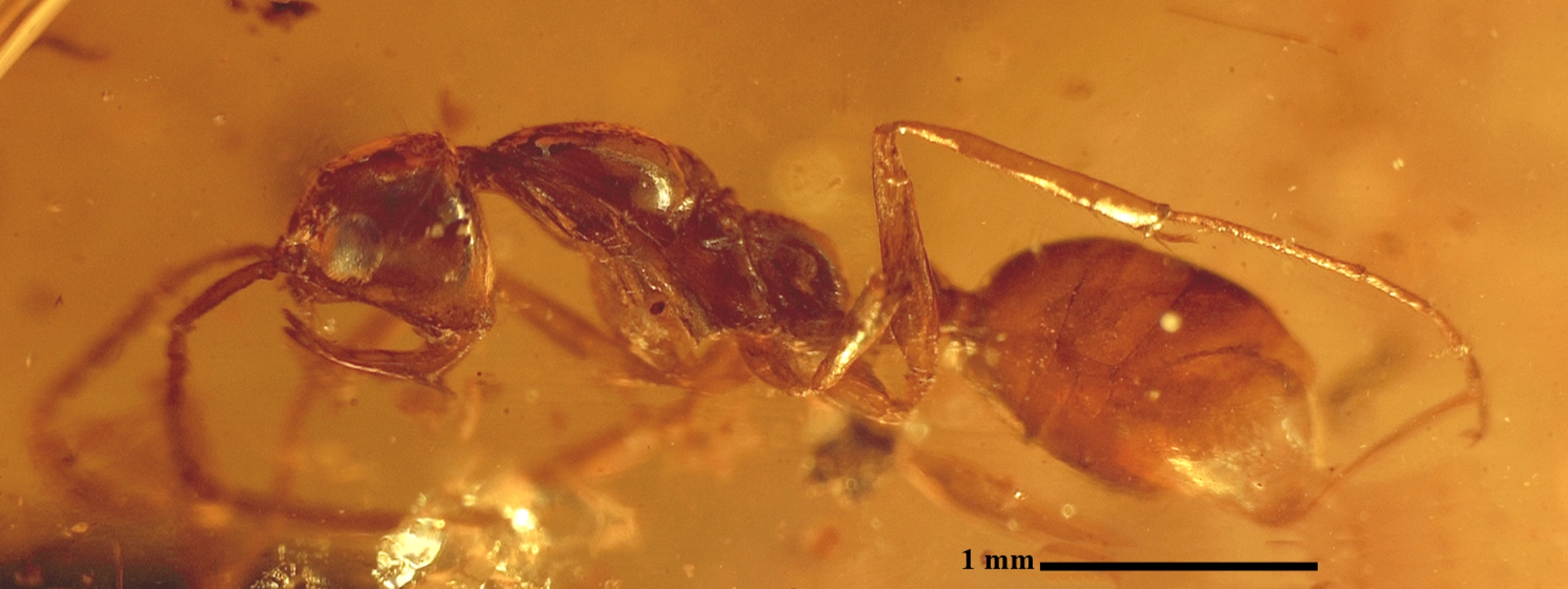
Haidomyrmex zigrasi

Including the type genus Haidomyrmex, the subfamily contains 11 genera and 15 species.

The vast majority of species are known from Burmese amber, which dates to the mid-Cretaceous, around 100 million years ago. Other species are known from French amber of equivalent age, as well as the Canadian amber of Alberta, Canada, which dates to around 80 million years ago. Only a single limestone fossil of a hell ant has been known so far. It is from the Crato Formation of Brazil, from around 113 million years ago, and is considered the oldest ant fossil ever found.

- Aquilomyrmex Perrichot et al., 2020
  - A. huangi Perrichot et al., 2020
- Ceratomyrmex Perrichot, Wang & Engel, 2016
  - Ce. ellenbergeri Perrichot, Wang & Engel, 2016
- Chonidris Perrichot et al., 2020
  - Ch. insolita Perrichot et al., 2020
- Dhagnathos Perrichot et al., 2020
  - Dh. autokrator Perrichot et al., 2020
- Dilobops Lattke & Melo, 2020
  - Di. bidentata Lattke & Melo, 2020
- Haidomyrmex Dlussky, 1996
  - Hx. cerberus Dlussky, 1996
  - Hx. scimitarus Barden & Grimaldi, 2012
  - Hx. zigrasi Barden & Grimaldi, 2012
- Haidomyrmodes Perrichot et al., 2008
  - Hs. mammuthus Perrichot et al., 2008
- Haidoterminus McKellar, Glasier & Engel, 2013
  - Ht. cippus McKellar, Glasier & Engel, 2013
- Linguamyrmex Barden & Grimaldi, 2017
  - L. brevicornis Perrichot et al., 2020
  - L. rhinocerus Miao & Wang, 2019
  - L. vladi Barden & Grimaldi, 2017
- Protoceratomyrmex Perrichot et al., 2020
  - P. revelatus Perrichot et al., 2020
- Vulcanidris Lepeco, Brandão, Camacho, 2025
  - V. cratensis Lepeco, Brandão, Camacho, 2025
Haidomyrmecinae species heads
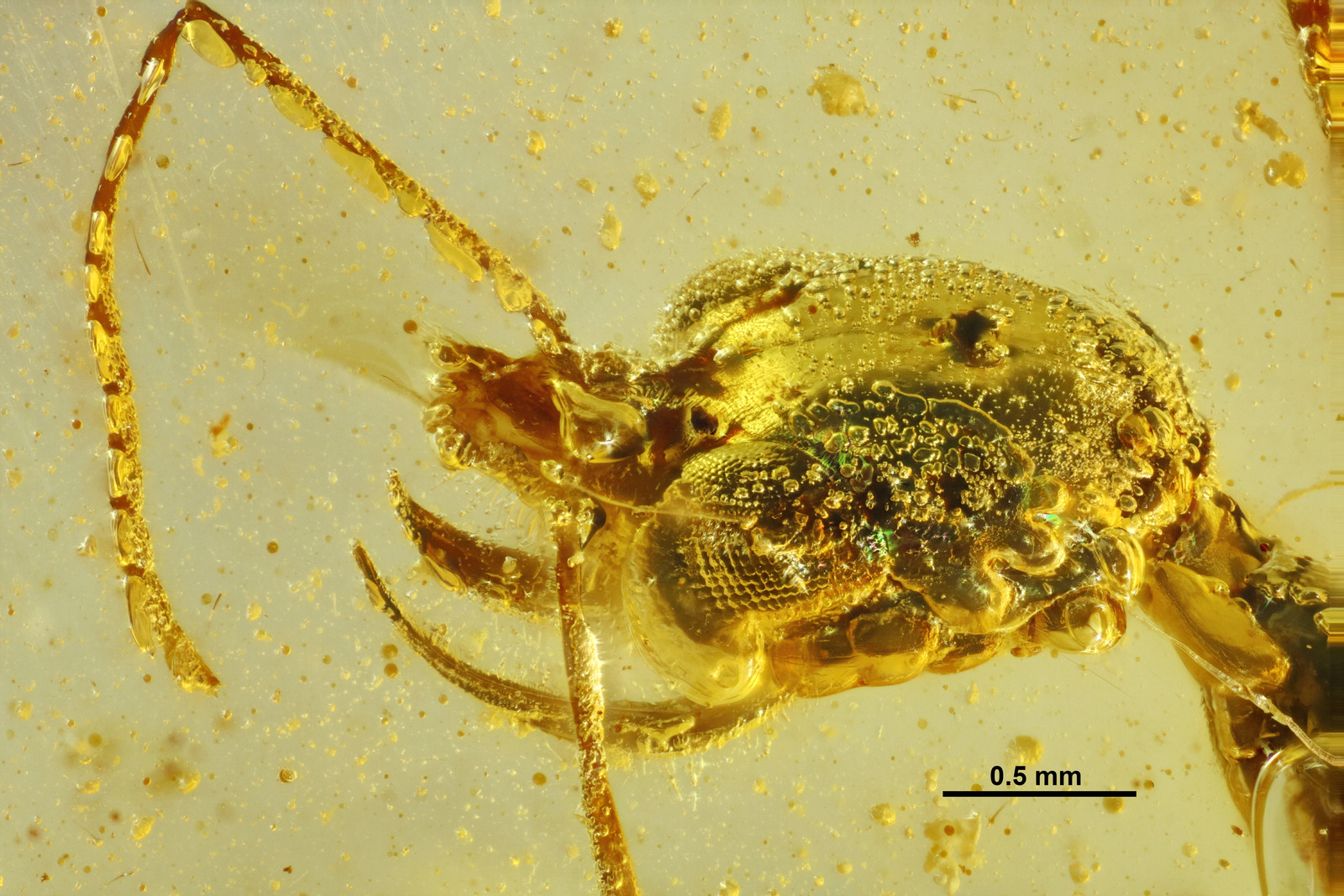
Aquilomyrmex huangi

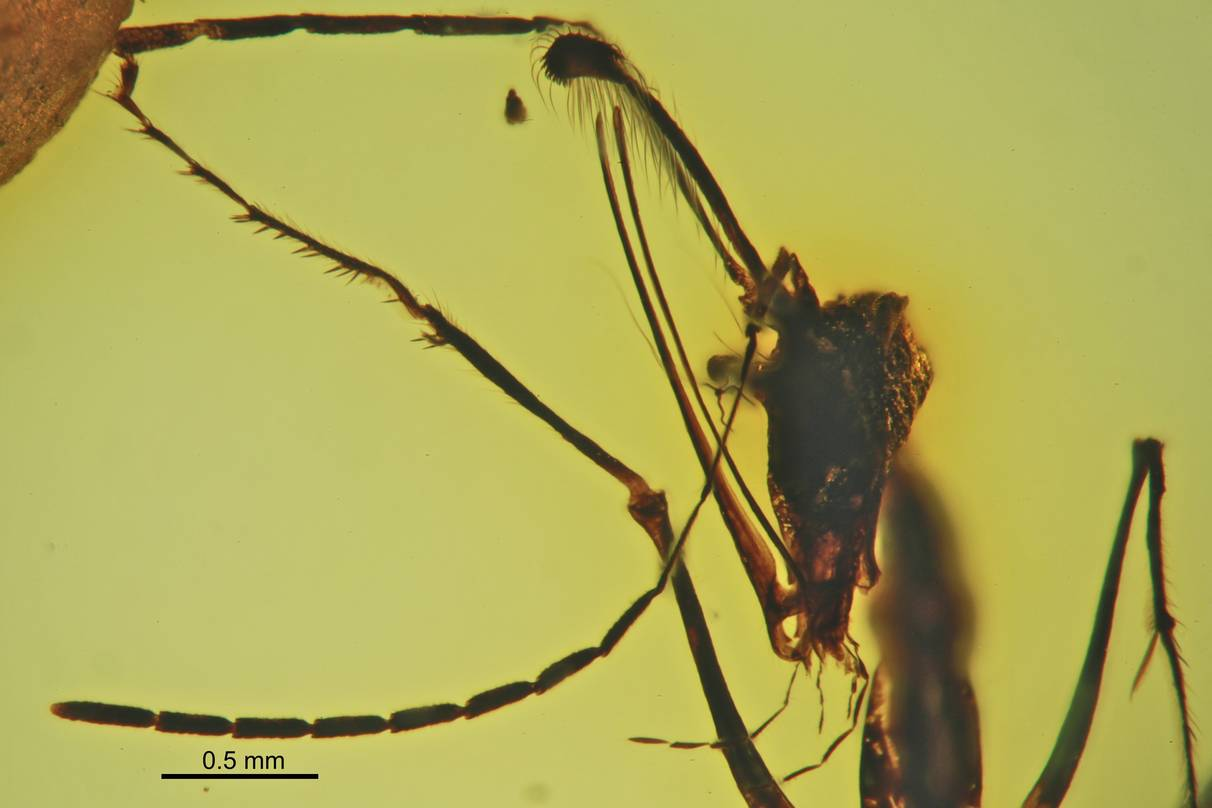
Ceratomyrmex ellenbergeri

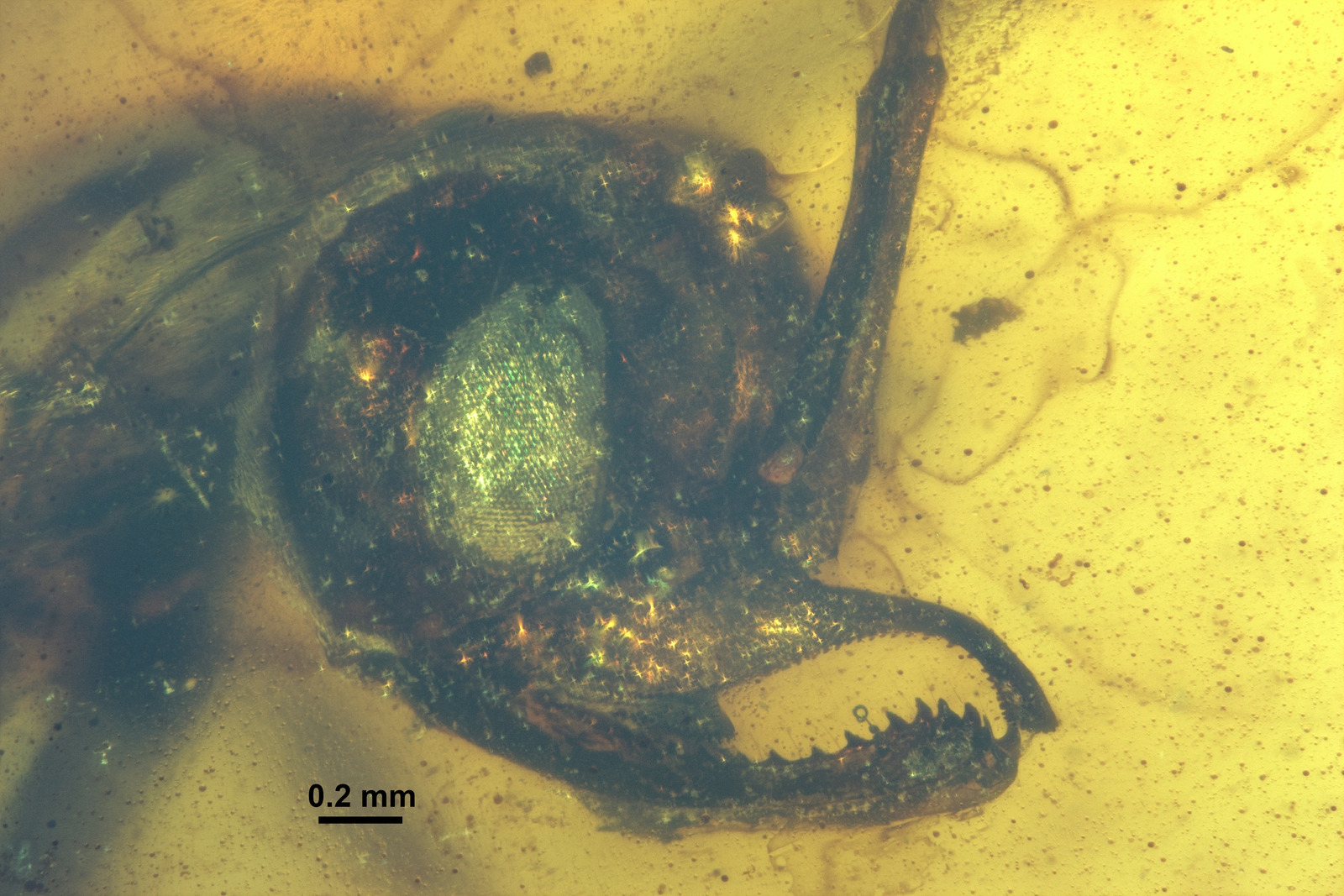
Chonidris insolita

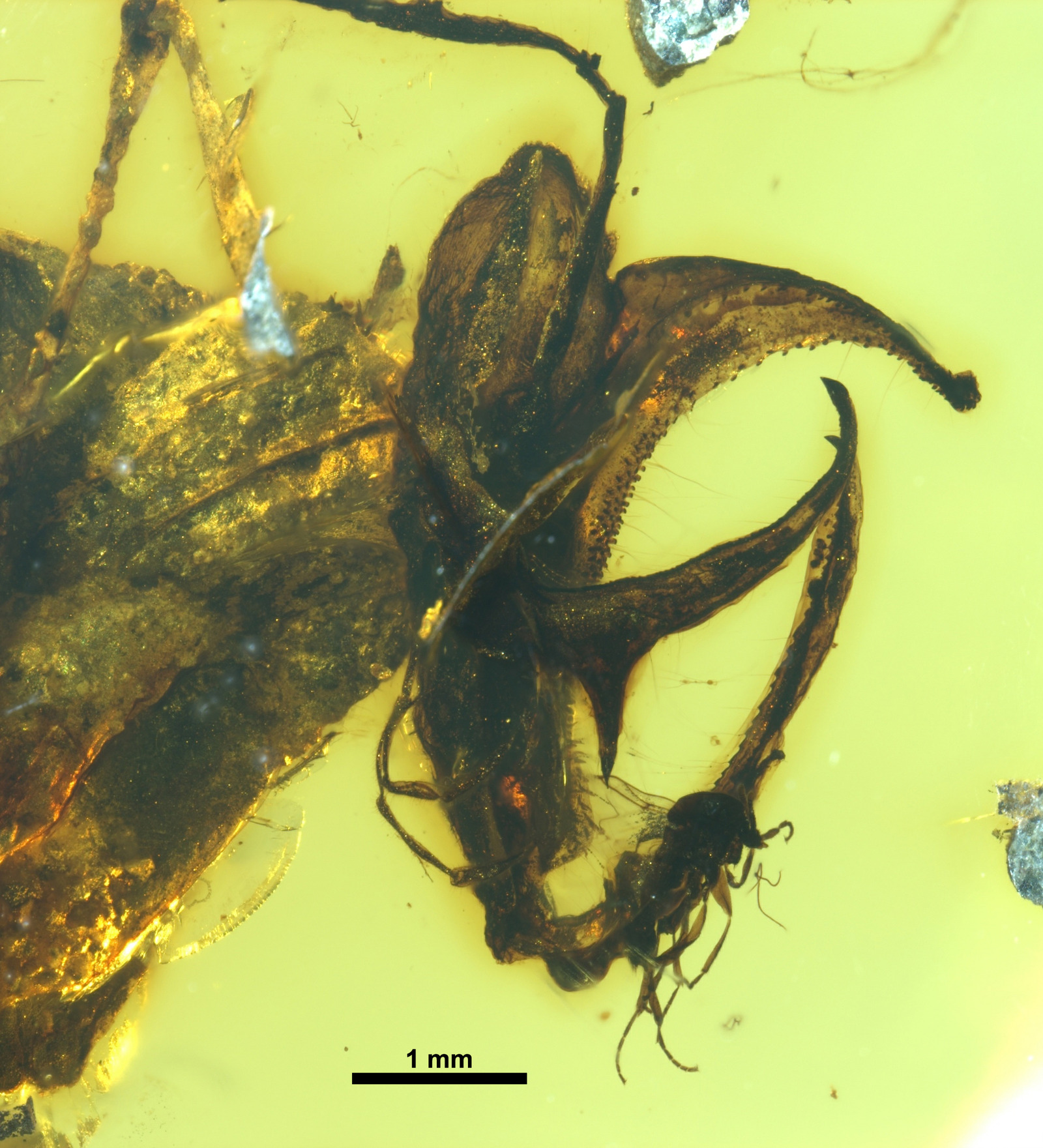
Dhagnathos autokrator

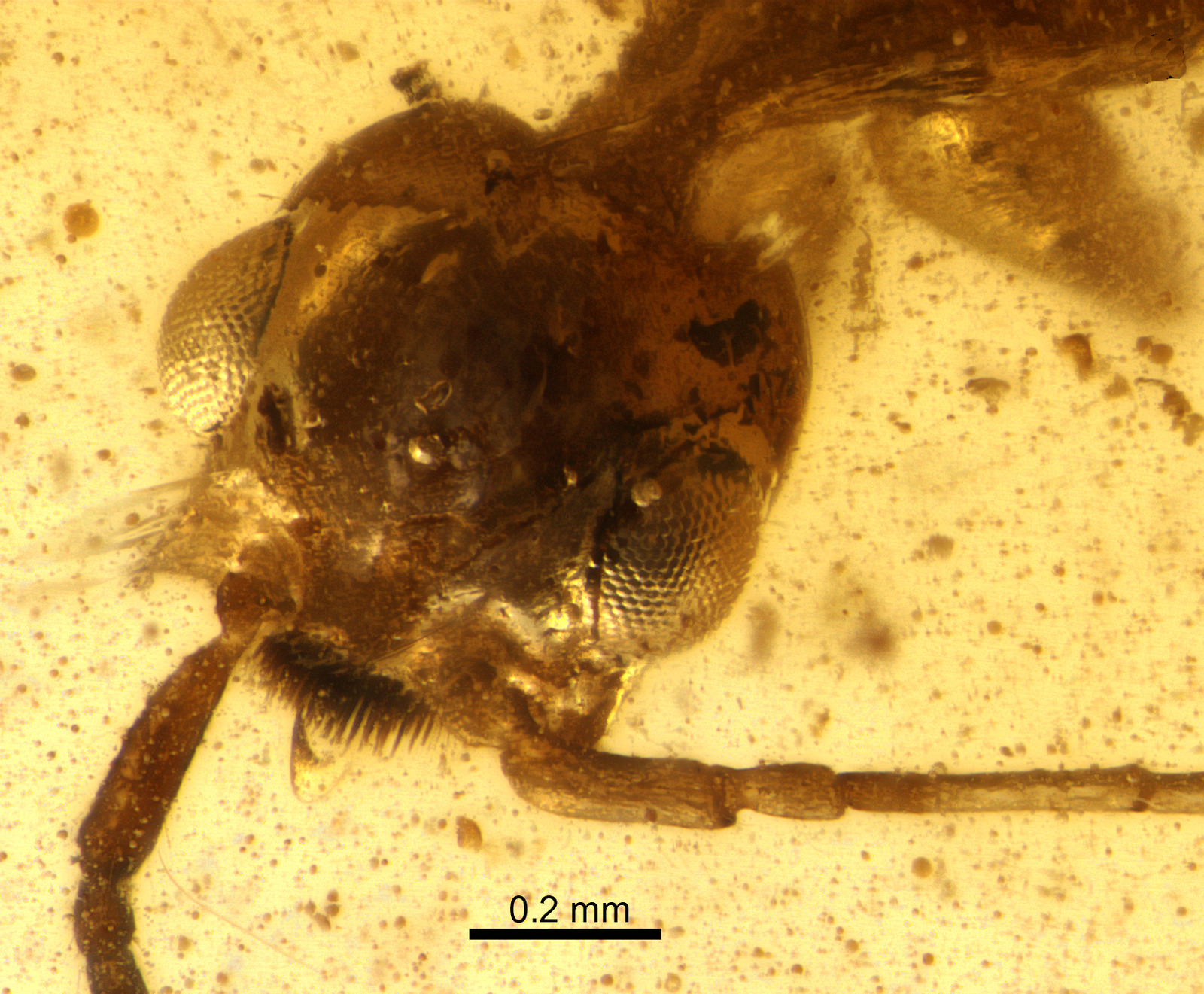
Dilobops bidentata

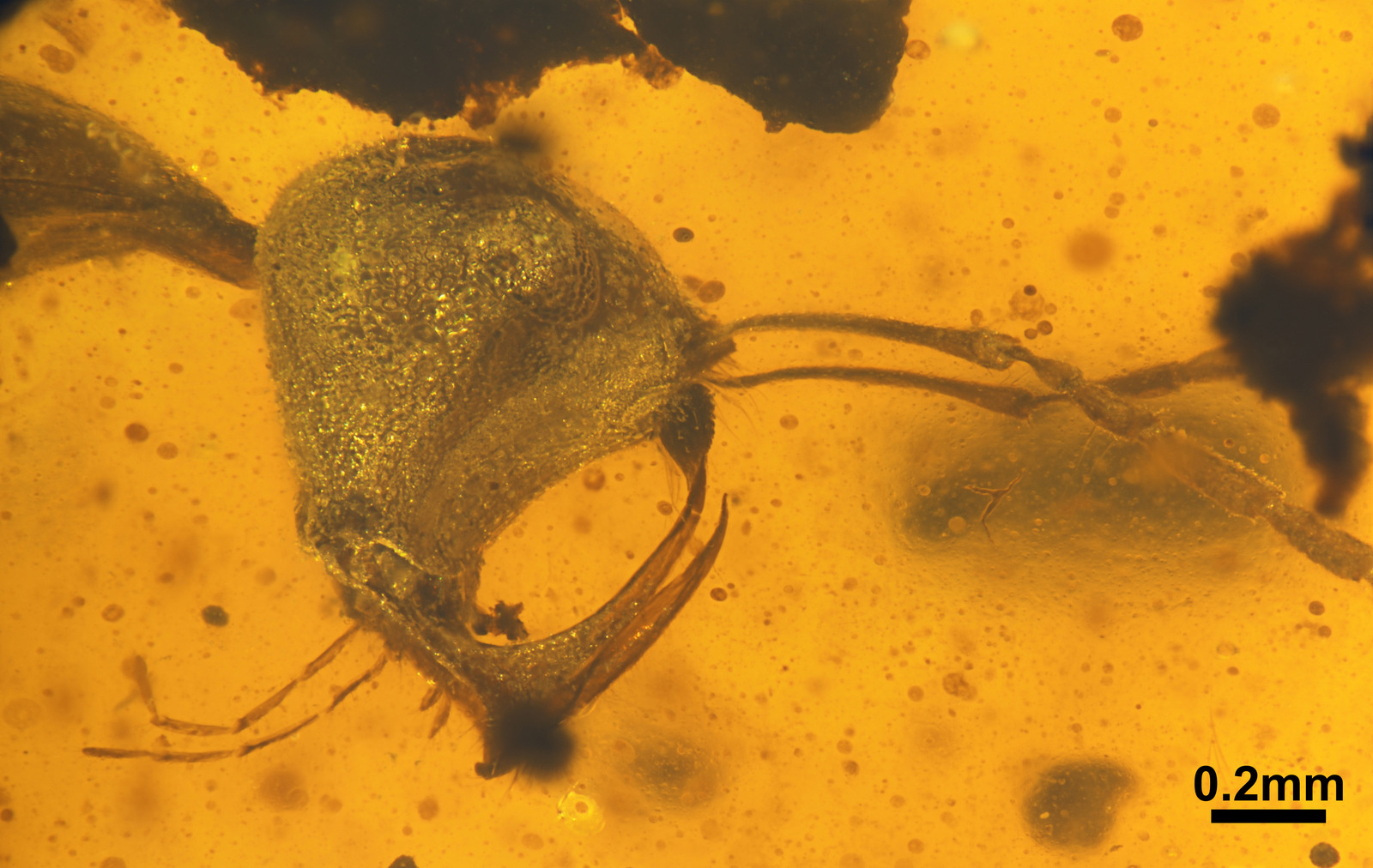
Haidomyrmex cerberus

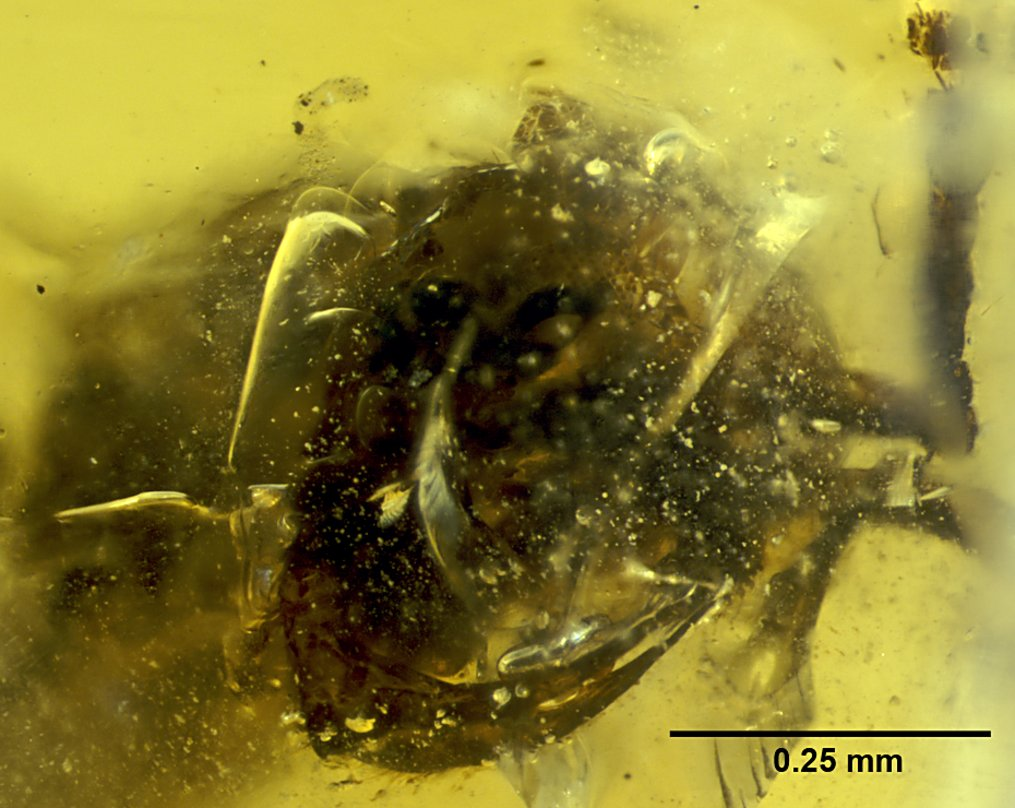
Haidomyrmodes mammuthus

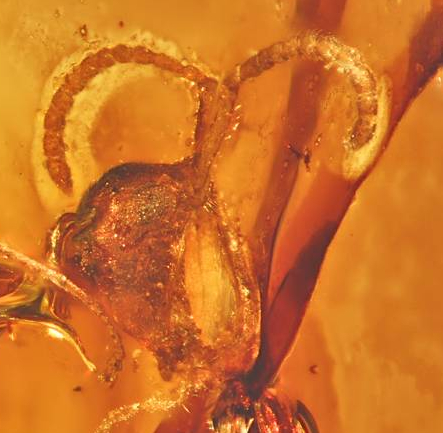
Haidoterminus cippus

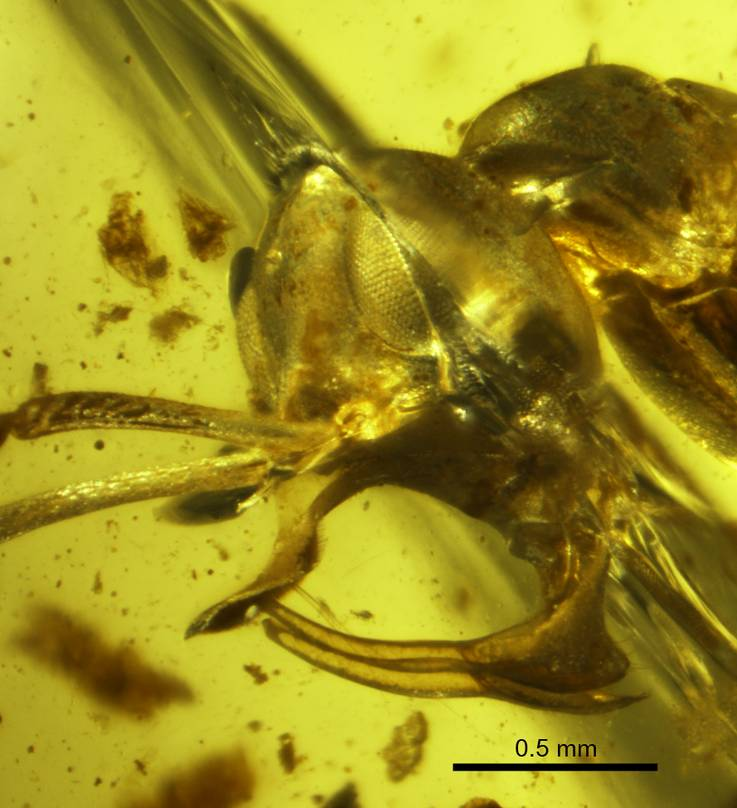
Linguamyrmex vladi

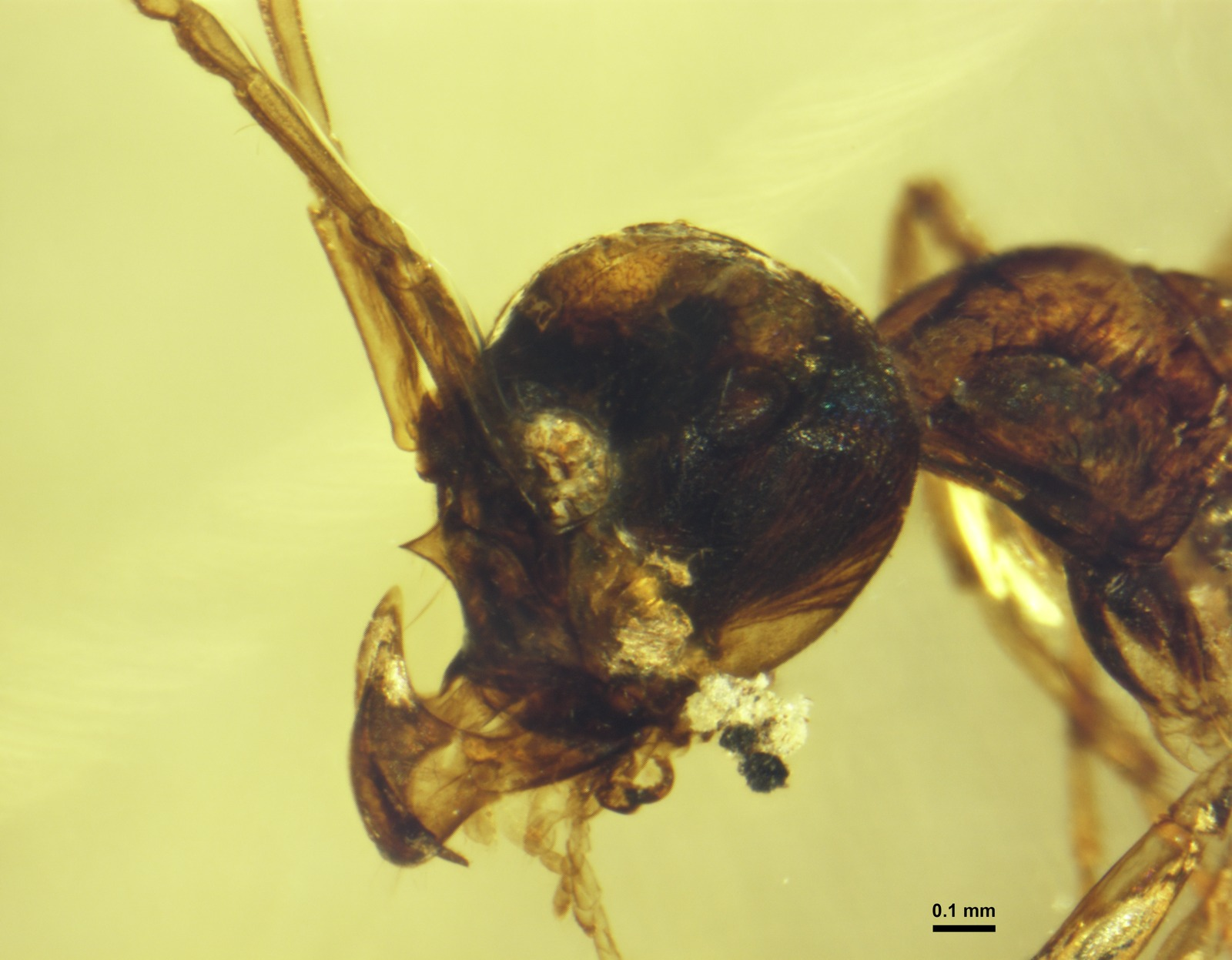
Protoceratomyrmex revelatus
