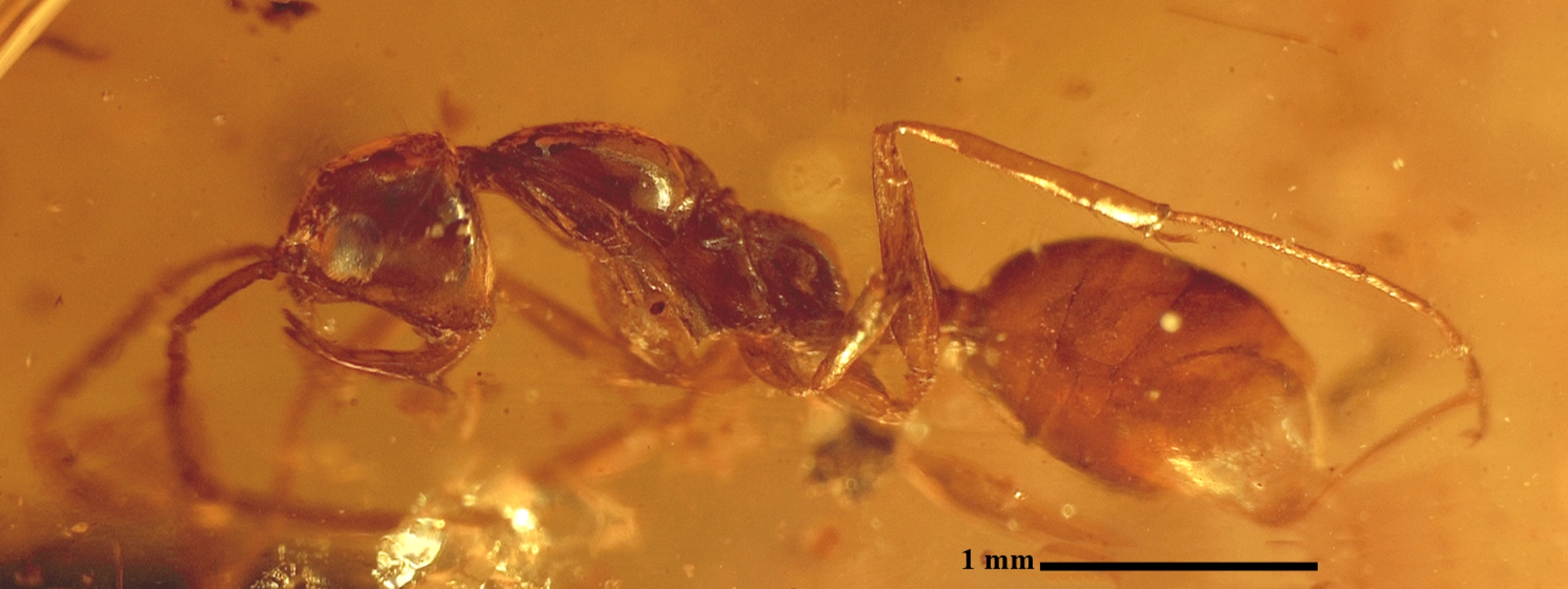
- Haidomyrmex zigrasi holotype

Scientific classification
- Domain: Eukaryota
- Kingdom: Animalia
- Phylum: Arthropoda
- Class: Insecta
- Order: Hymenoptera
- Family: Formicidae
- Subfamily: †Haidomyrmecinae
- Genus: †Haidomyrmex; Dlussky, 1996

Species
- H. cerberus; H. scimitarus; H. zigrasi

= Haidomyrmex =

Haidomyrmex Temporal range: Earliest Cenomanian 99 Ma

Extinct genus of ants

Haidomyrmex is an extinct genus of ants in the formicid subfamily Haidomyrmecinae, and is one of nine genera placed in the subfamily Haidomyrmecinae. The genus contains three described species Haidomyrmex cerberus, Haidomyrmex scimitarus, and Haidomyrmex zigrasi. All three are known from single Late Cretaceous fossils which have been found in Asia. H. cerberus is the type species and Haidomyrmex the type genus for the subfamily Haidomyrmecinae.

== History and classification ==
Haidomyrmex, is known from three solitary adult fossil specimens which are composed of mostly complete adult females which have been preserved as an inclusions in transparent chunk of Burmese amber. The amber specimens entombing H. scimitarus, and H. zigrasi were recovered from deposits in Kachin State, 100 kilometres (62 mi) west of Myitkyna town in Myanmar. In contrast, type specimen of H. cerberus was collected in the early 1900s from an unspecified location in Myanmar. Burmese amber has been radiometrically dated using U-Pb isotopes, yielding an age of approximately 99 million years old, close to the boundary between the Aptian and Cenomanian. The amber is suggested to have formed in a tropical environment around 5° north latitude and the resin to have been produced by either an Araucariaceae or Cupressaceae species tree. The mandibles of Haidomyrmecini genera are unique among ants in having a movement along the vertical plane. All other species with a trap-jaw type mandible structure show movement along the horizontal plane. Barden and Grimaldi suggest that the mandibles may have been capable of opening up to between 140° and 180°, if 0° is a closed position with the mandible tips near the clypeus. The resulting gape that results from the open position is nearly twice the head capsule diameter. The long legs and antennae are both features seen in arboreal ant species, and it has been suggested that the species may have nested in preexisting cavities in trees.

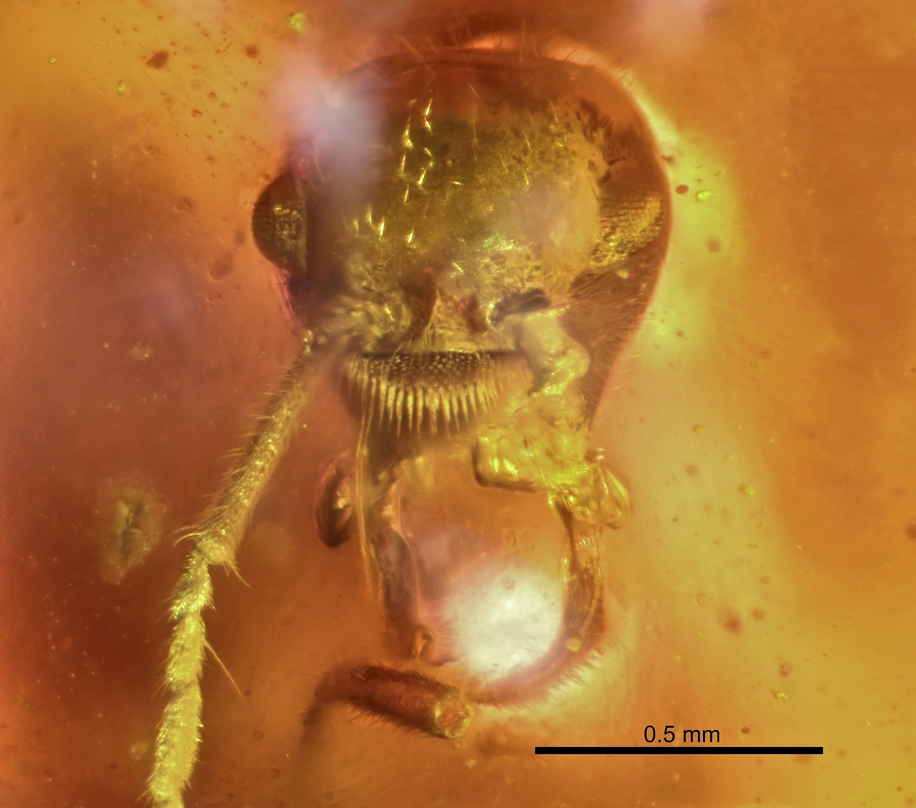
Haidomyrmex cerberus holotype workers head

The holotype of H. cerberus, specimen number "BMNH 20182" was deposited in the Natural History Museum Burmese amber collection in London. Specimen number AMNH Bu-FB80 is the holotype for H. scimitarus and was part of an amber collection purchased from Federico Berlöcher by the American Museum of Natural History. Unlike the other two species, at the time of description, the holotype for H. zigrasi, JZC-BuXX, was residing in the private collection of James Zigras and only loaned to the paleoentomologists for study.

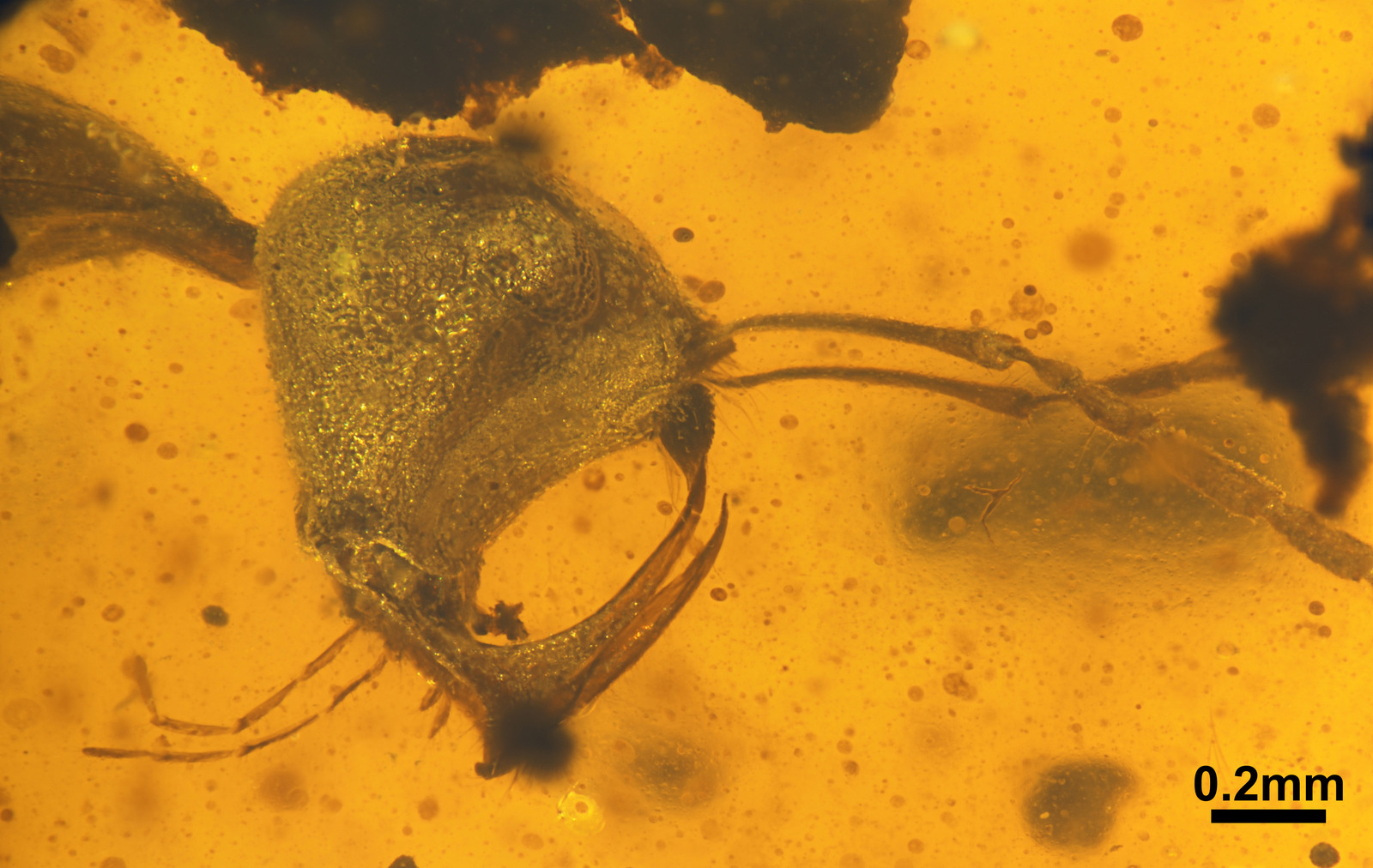
head of H. cerberus worker described in 2020

Despite its collection in the early 1900s fossils of the genus were not described until the Russian paleoentomologist Gennady M. Dlussky studied H. cerberus nearly 80 years later. Dlussky published the 1996 type description of the new genus and species in the Paleontological Journal. The genus name Haidomyrmex was coined as a combination of the Greek word Haidos meaning "Hades the realm of the dead" and Myrmica, a genus of ants. The specific epithet cerberus refers to the guardian of the underworld Cerberus. The second and third species in the genus were described in a single paper by Phillip Barden and David Grimaldi, both of the American Museum of Natural History, published in the journal American Museum Novitates in 2012. The specific epithet scimitarus is a reference to the similar shape of the species mandibles and a scimitar while the epithet zigrasi is a patronym honoring James Zigras for his loan of specimens to study. Haidomyrmex is one of five genera in Haidomyrmecini, the other four being Ceratomyrmex, Linguamyrmex, Haidomyrmodes and Haidoterminus.

== Descriptions ==
Overall the species of Haidomyrmex are gracile ants which range from 3.0 to 8.0 millimetres (0.12 to 0.31 in) in length and have a generally smooth exoskeleton. All species show a lack of ocelli but have distinct bulging compound eyes. The antennae, where fully known, are long with eleven total segments while the clypeus is generally developed into a setae covered pad and sporting two long trigger hairs. The highly modified mandibles are generally scythe to L-shaped and have only two teeth, displaying a hinge movement placing the tips of the mandibles on the clypeus surface. The structure of the mandibles and clypeus result in an elongated head. The legs are very long and the pretarsal claw has a single tooth while the metasoma show telescoping segments and a fully retractable sting.

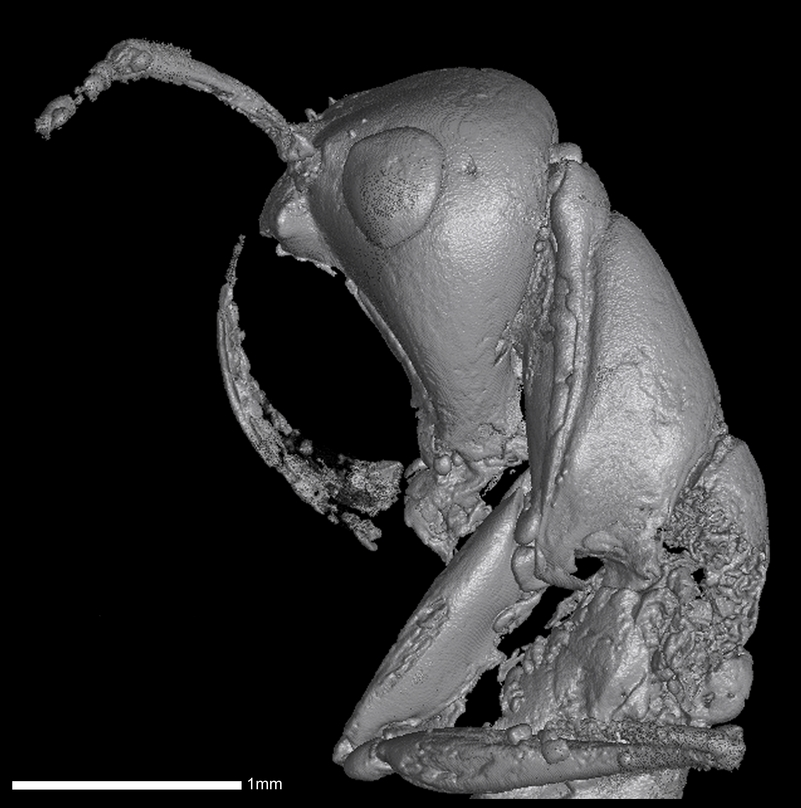
H. scimitarus tomographic scan

H. cerberus is known from a partial wingless female worker estimated to have been 5 millimetres (0.20 in) long by Dlussky. The L-shaped mandibles are positioned at an oblique angle to each other with a wide separation of the mandible bases and lack a margin for mastication of food items. The eyes are smaller than those seen on H. scimitarus and the mesonotum is short and more robust. In profile H.cerberus has a mesonotum showing distinct metapleural glands and a propodeum which is rounded. The tibia of the middle and hind legs sport two distinct spurs, a simple spur and a pectinate. The gaster is only partially preserved, and absent from the second gastral segment back. Also missing from the specimen is the left trigger setae, left antenna and the right antenna after the seventh segment. The legs are present but detached from the body.

The single H. scimitarus specimen is a preserved dealate queen with a total body length of 8.0 millimetres (0.31 in), making H. scimitarus the largest of the three species. The mandibles are a distinct scythe shape, with a more distinct curve, rather the defined angle found in H. cerberus. The mandibles are positioned parallel to each other with the bases closely positioned to each other. The protruding clypeus is large and has a roughly pentagonal shape and two pairs of long fine trigger hairs on the ventral side. The gaster is 2.4 millimetres (0.094 in) long with telescoping tergites and a fully retractable sting 0.75 millimetres (0.030 in) in length.

The smallest species of the three is H. zigrasi, with a length of just 3.5 millimetres (0.14 in), under half the length of either other species. The antennae have and exposed base and are an overall length of 1.93 millimetres (0.076 in). Unlike either of the other species, the compound eyes of H. zigrasi are positioned in the front half of the head capsule while the eyes in both H. cerberus and H. scimitarus are positioned near the middle of the head capsule. The smoothly curved mandibles curve up immediately from the base and sport an asymmetrical tooth near the base which projects downward. The left mandible's tooth is distinctly larger than that on the right mandible. The pairs of trigger hairs bracketing the mandible tips are 0.12 millimetres (0.0047 in) long, shorter than in the other species.
