= Eotapinoma =

Eotapinoma Temporal range: 79–56 Ma Campanian – Paleocene

Scientific classification
- Domain: Eukaryota
- Kingdom: Animalia
- Phylum: Arthropoda
- Class: Insecta
- Order: Hymenoptera
- Family: Formicidae
- Subfamily: Dolichoderinae
- Tribe: incertae sedis
- Genus: †Eotapinoma; Dlussky, 1988

Type species
- Eotapinoma gracilis

Diversity
- 3 fossil species

Genus of ants

Eotapinoma is an extinct genus of ants of the subfamily Dolichoderinae. It was described by Dlussky in 1988.

== Species ==
There are three fossil species described to the genus.

- Eotapinoma compacta Dlussky, 1988
- Eotapinoma gracilis Dlussky, 1988
- Eotapinoma macalpini Dlussky, 1999
