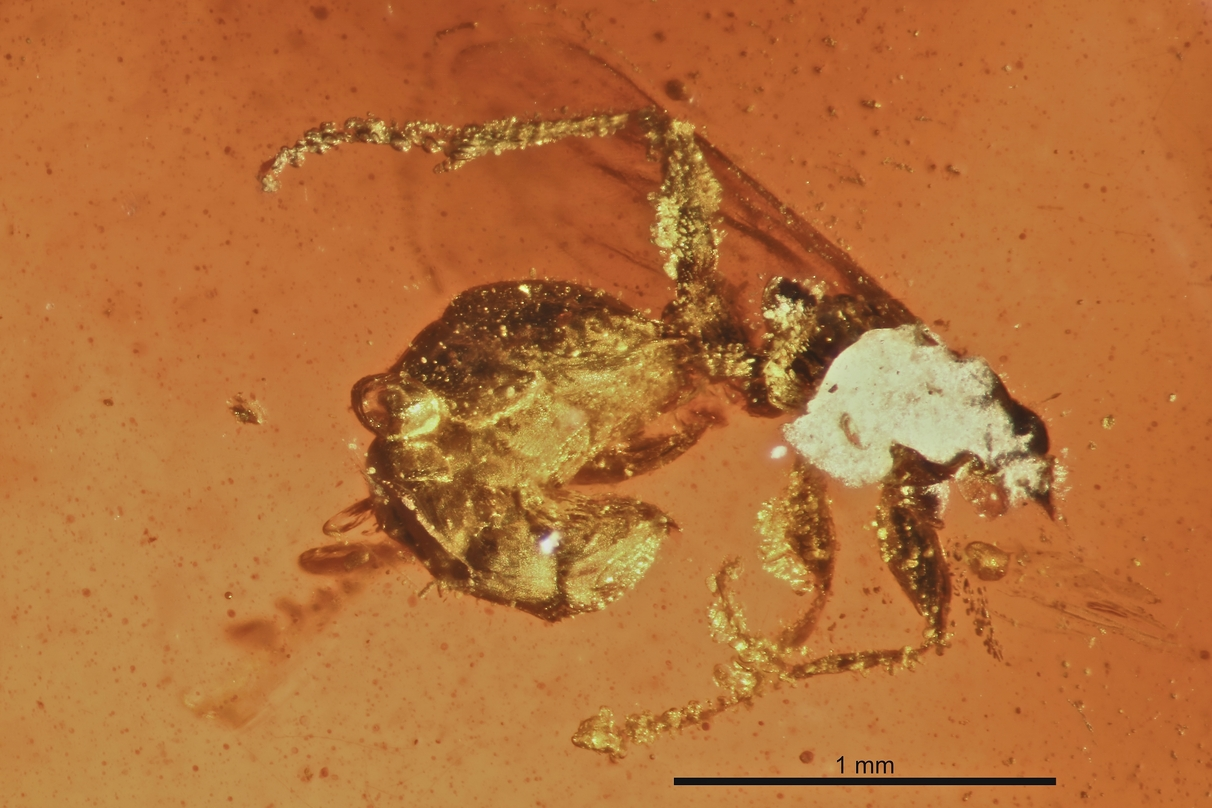
- Burmomyrma rossi holotype

Scientific classification
- Kingdom: Animalia
- Phylum: Arthropoda
- Class: Insecta
- Order: Hymenoptera
- Genus: †Burmomyrma; Dlussky, 1996
- Species: †B. rossi

Binomial name
- †Burmomyrma rossi Dlussky, 1996

= Burmomyrma =

Burmomyrma Temporal range: Late Albian to Early Cenomanian

Genus of ants

Burmomyrma is an extinct genus of aculeate hymenopteran, suggested to be an ant. The genus contains a single described species, Burmomyrma rossi. Burmomyrma is known from a single Middle Cretaceous fossil which was found in Asia.

== History and classification ==
Burmomyrma is known from a solitary adult fossil, the holotype, specimen number BMNH 19125. While the type specimen was collected in the early 1900s and deposited in the Natural History Museum in London, description of the specimen did not occur until nearly 80 years later. The holotype specimen is composed of a mostly complete adult female which has been preserved as an inclusion in transparent chunks of deep yellow and relatively clear Burmese amber. The amber specimen was recovered from deposits in Kachin State of Myanmar. Burmese amber has been radiometrically dated using U-Pb isotopes, yielding an age of approximately 99 million years old, close to the Albian – Cenomanian boundary.

The fossil was first studied by Russian paleoentomologist Gennady M. Dlussky of the Moscow State University. Dlussky's 1996 type description of the new genus and species was published in the Paleontological Journal. The genus name Burmomyrma is a combination of Burma, where the fossil was found, and the Greek myrmica which means "ant". The specific epithet rossi is a patronym honoring British paleoentomologist Andrew J. Ross. The structures of the waist and wings lead Dlussky to tentatively place Burmomyrma in the subfamily Aneuretinae. Due to the incomplete nature of the fossil, the genus has not been assigned to either of the aneuretine tribes, being left incertae sedis. This placement had been followed by other authors, including in the 2003 family review by entomologist Barry Bolton. In a 2015 review of formicids, Brendon Boudinot noted that the features Dlussky listed for the inclusion of Burmomyrma in Aneuretinae are pleisiomorphic, being found in several ant subfamilies, and that placement of the genus into several other subfamilies is possible. However Boudinot did not make any taxonomic moves in the review, leaving the Aneuretinae placement stand at that time. In 2018 a revision suggested that the genus was not an ant, but was an ant-mimic wasp in the family Falsiformicidae with two other genera known from the Taimyr amber. However, other studies have disputed this claim, finding that again instead it was an ant, but the highly fragmentary remains made its precise position uncertain.

== Description ==
The solitary Burmomyrma specimen is incomplete and shows poor preservation in general with the antennae, head, and part of the thorax missing from the edge of the amber. Overall it is estimated the full female body would have been around 3.0 millimetres (0.12 in) long with a thorax of about 1.0 millimetre (0.039 in). The gaster is unconstricted, showing articulation between the first and second segments, and the first segments sports a number of short erect hairs. The sting has a distinct slight upward curvature and is overall short. The waist is composed of a single segment, composed of a nodiform petiole showing a cylindrical frontal area and narrowed posterior area. The forewing venation shows a lack of closed cells formed by veins. The petiol and forewings are distinguishing characters.
