= Metapleural gland =

General body plan of a worker ant: the metapleural gland may be found on the thorax (see red-outlined box).

Metapleural glands (also called metasternal or metathoracic glands) are secretory glands that were considered unique to ants and basal in the evolutionary history of ants. They are responsible for the production of an antibiotic fluid that then collects in a reservoir on the posterior of the ant's alitrunk. These reservoirs are also referred to as the bulla and vary in size between ant species and also between castes of the same species. As of 2023, research has found a metapleural gland convergently evolved in the wasp species Pelecinus polyturator.

From the bulla, ants can groom the secretion onto the surface of their exoskeleton. This helps to prevent the growth of bacteria and fungal spores on the ants and inside their nest.

Though considered an important component in an ant's immunity against parasites, some ant species have lost the gland during their evolution. These losses correlate with ants that have a 'weaving' lifestyle, such as ants in the genus Oecophylla, Camponotus and Polyrhachis. It was originally suggested that because this weaving lifestyle also tended to involve an arboreal lifestyle, the parasite pressure above ground was not as great as for terrestrial ants, resulting in a reduced selective pressure to keep this antibiotic gland. Recent work suggests instead that these ants may just use other antiparasitic defenses such as increased grooming and venom.

Most male ants are not known to have metapleural glands. It is believed that they benefit from the shared secretions of ant workers and do not need any themselves. Additionally, slave-making ants do not have metapleural glands, though the slave species they use do and it is these ants that groom the slavemakers and their brood.
