= Armaniinae =

Armaniinae Temporal range: Late Cretaceous

Scientific classification
- Kingdom: Animalia
- Phylum: Arthropoda
- Clade: Pancrustacea
- Class: Insecta
- Order: Hymenoptera
- Family: Formicidae
- Subfamily: †Armaniinae (Dlussky, 1983)

Extinct group of insects

Armaniinae is a subfamily of extinct ant-like hymenopterans known from a series of Cretaceous fossils found in Asia and Africa. It is usually treated as one of the stem-group subfamilies in family Formicidae, although some myrmecologists treat it as a distinct family. A 2007 study analysing petiole and antenna morphology led to the proposal that at least some of the armaniid genera be placed in Sphecomyrminae, although others are unconvinced by the arguments and retain Armaniinae. The subfamily contains seven genera with fourteen described species.

== History and classification ==
Armaniinae is sometimes treated as the most basal of the Formicidae subfamilies, and classed as a stem-group which is more distant in relation to modern ants than the next stem group, Sphecomyrminae. Alternatively, the group has been treated as "ant-like wasps", and elevated to the rank of family as Armaniidae, and considered as a possible sister group to Formicidae. It has been suggested by Engel and Grimaldi that the group may be paraphyletic. This position is in contrast to the original hypothesis of Russian paleoentomologist Gennady Dlussky, who first described the family. Dlussky considered the group, when erected in 1983, have been an intermediate family bridging the families Scoliidae and the true formicids. In contrast to both the treatment as a separate family and as a distinct subfamily, entomologist E. O. Wilson, in a 1987 paper, suggested that the then known armaniids and Sphecomyrma represented a single species. Wilson, in synonymizing the groups, made the hypothesis that the different described genera were actually fossils of different castes of the same species, with Sphecomyrma freyi being workers, Armania robusta being queens, and "Paleomyrmex" zherichini as the winged males. This view was rejected as new fossils and species were described.

The group is known exclusively from impression fossils, which have a limited preservation quality, leading to the uncertainty of what features are present in the described species. Overall armaniids have a poorly developed petiole which is broadly attached to the thorax, short scapes on the antennae, and queen-like looking females. The mandibles are vespid like, with possibly only one or two teeth, though this may be an artifact of preservation. The short scape is a feature that is also seen in Sphecomyrminae members, and does not exclude armaniids from Formicidae. Similarly the petiole is a feature that is seen in both the true formicids, and in the extinct chrysidoid wasp family Falsiformicidae, which is not related to formicids at all. The two defining features of the true formicids are considered to be the presence of females which are divided into adult workers and queens. Currently no worker like armaniid specimens are known for the described species. The presence of metapleural glands in some fossils has been reported by Dlussky,± but the veracity of the presence is uncertain.

A review of the Cretaceous ant groups was performed by Borysenko in 2017 leading to the breakup of Armaniidae, with the three genera Armania, Orapia, and Pseudarmania being moved to Sphecomyrminae. The genera Archaeopone and Poneropterus were considered as incertae sedis in Formicidae, and the genera Dolichomyrma and Khetania were removed from the family entirely as incertae sedis in Aculeata.

== Genera and species ==
- Archaeopone Dlussky, 1975
  - Archaeopone kzylzharica Dlussky, 1975
  - Archaeopone taylori Dlussky, 1983
- Armania Dlussky, 1983 (jr synonym = "Armaniella" Dlussky, 1983)
  - Armania capitata Dlussky, 1983
  - Armania curiosa (Dlussky, 1983)
  - Armania pristina Dlussky, 1983
  - Armania robusta Dlussky, 1983
- Dolichomyrma Dlussky, 1975
  - Dolichomyrma latipes Dlussky, 1975
  - Dolichomyrma longiceps Dlussky, 1975
- Khetania Dlussky, 1999
  - Khetania mandibulata Dlussky, 1999
- Orapia Dlussky, Brothers & Rasnitsyn, 2004
  - Orapia minor Dlussky, Brothers & Rasnitsyn, 2004
  - Orapia rayneri Dlussky, Brothers & Rasnitsyn, 2004
- Poneropterus Dlussky, 1983
  - Poneropterus sphecoides Dlussky, 1983
- Pseudarmania Dlussky, 1983
  - Pseudarmania aberrans Dlussky, 1983
  - Pseudarmania rasnitsyni Dlussky, 1983
