= Microphorus =

Microphorus may refer to two different genera of insects:

- Microphorus, a synonym for Microphor, a genus of flies
- Microphorus, a synonym for Microplophorus, a genus of beetles
