= New Jersey amber =

Amber found in the Raritan and Magothy Formations of the United States

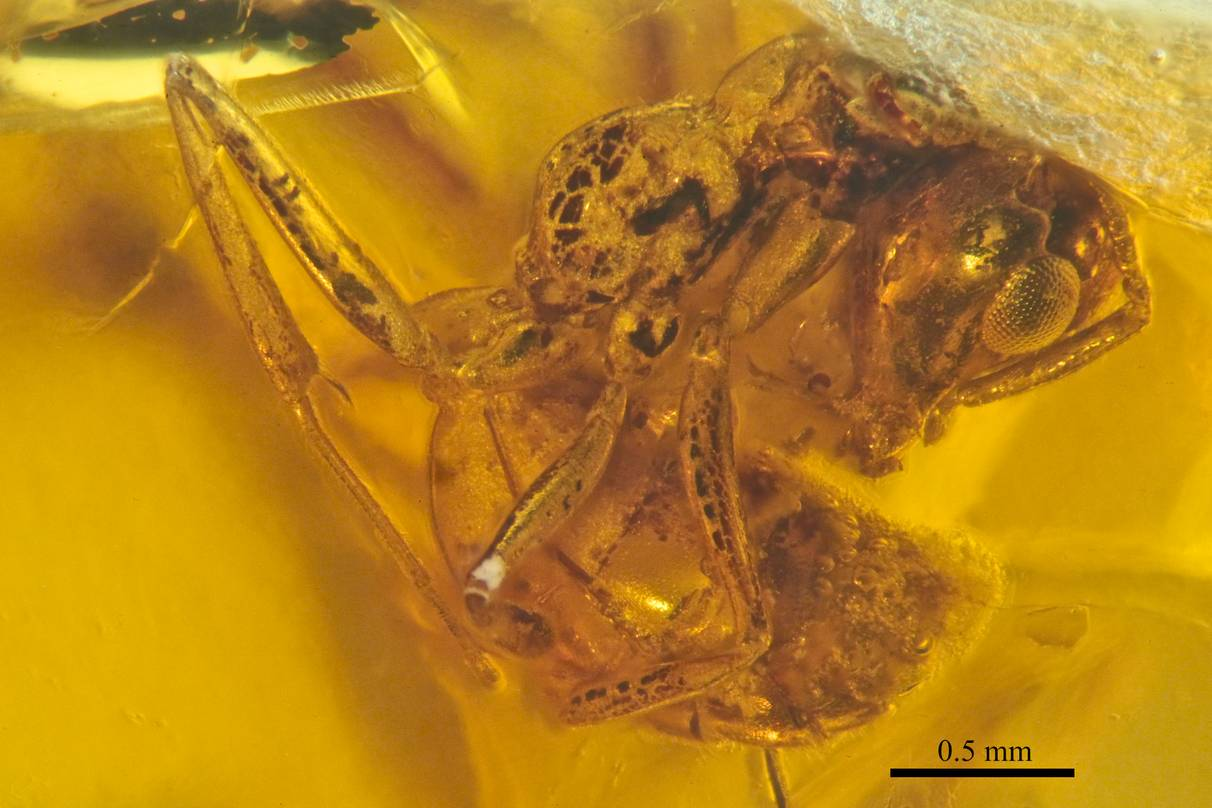
Brownimecia clavata holotype, lateral view, fossil in New jersey amber, specimen number AMNH-NJ667

New Jersey Amber, sometimes called Raritan amber, is amber found in the Raritan and Magothy Formations of the Central Atlantic (Eastern) coast of the United States. It is dated to the Late Cretaceous, Turonian age, based on pollen analysis of the host formations. It has been known since the 19th century, with several of the old clay-pit sites now producing many specimens for study. It has yielded a number of organism fossils, including fungi, plants, tardigrades, insects and feathers. The first identified Cretaceous age ant was described from a fossil found in New Jersey in 1966.

== Occurrence ==
Though named after New Jersey, the fossil-bearing strata of the Raritan and overlying Magothy formations are also exposed in several neighboring U.S. states, including Maryland through south and central New Jersey, across Staten Island and Long Island (coastal areas of New York state), to a northern exposure at Martha's Vineyard, an island of Massachusetts.

Of the two formations that New Jersey amber is found in, the Raritan Formation underlies the Magothy Formation. The Magothy formation is reported by Wilson's 1967 paper describing Sphecomyrma freyi as having exposures in Maryland, New Jersey, New York, Delaware, and other unspecified islands along the New England coastline. The formation consists of gray to dark brown clay beds interlayered in light-colored sands. In the clay layers are lignite lenses, leaf impressions, and the amber. At the time of the paper's publication, the age was uncertain, and given by Wilson and Carpenter as approximately 100 million years old. Amber deposits of the Raritan Formation are mainly in the Old Bridge sand member and South Amboy Fire Clay Member, with the latter being fossilized in situ, with no disturbance after deposition. Palynological dating of the South Amboy Fire clay has returned a Turonian age, placing the members in the Complexiopollis – Santanacites palynostratigraphic zones.

Amber specimens are recovered from the South Amboy Fire Clay member, part of the Raritan Formation. Deposited in lagoons and saltwater marshes along the Cretaceous eastern seaboard. The lithology exposed in the Crossmans clay pits shows that the lagoons and marshes had brackish water channels where water flow diminished and anoxic conditions formed. This is supported by the presence of pyrite and marcasite on and around amber specimens, with some amber totally encased in the iron sulphides. The number of insect groups that need fresh water to survive, such as caddisflies, indicates that fresh water was close to the delta area.

Amber was first mentioned in 1821 by naturalist Gerard Troost, who described a specimen which contained a group of fossil scale insects from an outcrop at Cape Sable, Maryland. Hollick reported in 1905 that during the height of clay mining at the turn of the 20th century, amber was found in such volumes that it was saved, and burned during the winter for heat. A number of the clay mines are now sources of amber for study. The White Oaks site (or White Oaks pit) is part of the Old Crossman's pit clay mine in Sayreville, New Jersey. It contains outcrops of the amber-bearing South Amboy Fire Clay that are noted to be rich in inclusions.

== Chemistry ==
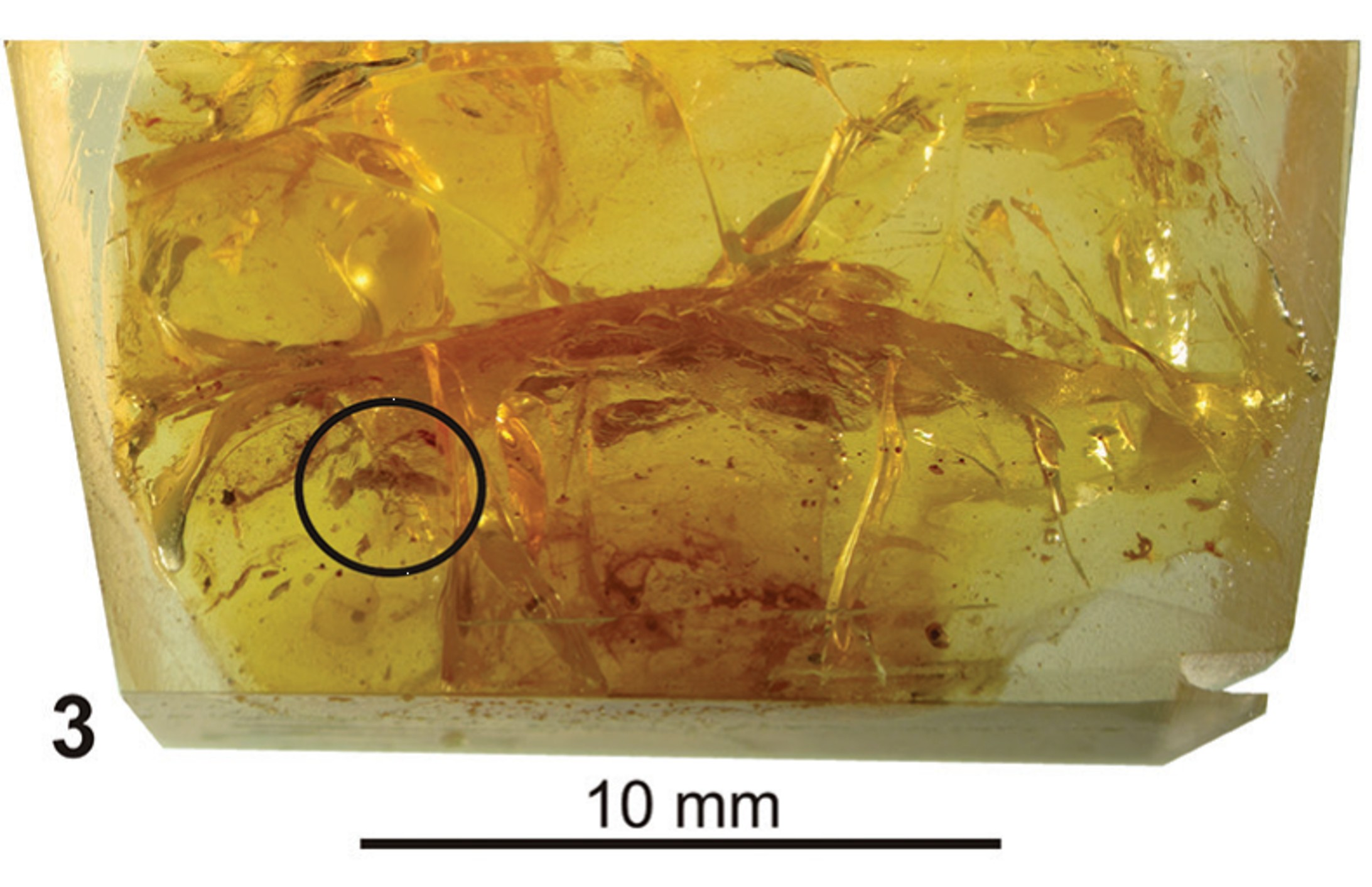
Amber preserved in resin block

New Jersey amber is grouped by Anderson 1992 as a Class Ib amber, being composed of labdanoid diterpenes, and lacking a presence of succinic acid in the structure. Ragazzi et al in 2003 listed the possible plant families the amber may have been produced by as including Cupressaceae, Araucariaceae, or Hamamelidaceae, but only Cupressaceae was listed by Bisulca et al. The amber is noted as being insoluble in solutions of both ethyl ether and ethanol. Ragazzi et al indicated that New Jersey amber had a distinct amount of sulphur, 0.29%, included in its chemical composition. The color of the amber ranges from clear yellows and yellow oranges through opaque yellows and reds. The amber is noted to be brittle and friable, with specimens noted to crack and craze. Deep-red amber specimens are also noted to form deep needle-like cracks. A series of tests on ambers, including New Jersey amber, was published in 2012 by Bisulca et al. Exposure to a combination of light and humidity changes can cause significant crazing. The amber also has a distinct light absorbance curve that peaks in the ultraviolet B range at 385 nm. This is similar to the slightly older Burmese amber, which has an absorbance peak of 380 nm. Exposure to increase in temperature over a period of time has been shown to result in "yellowing" or darkening of the amber over a long period of time, though not to as significant a degree as seen in Baltic amber. Overall the stability of New Jersey amber is low due its UV absorption, making specimens susceptible to UV deterioration. The only conditions that Bisulca et al identified which seemed to produce stable New Jersey amber specimens were those that were anoxic.

== Botanical origin ==
Edward W. Berry notes that an "amber-like" substance preserved in resin canals of fossil conifer cones that he assigned to taxon "Dammara". Berry suggests that the majority of the amber in the taxon was considered araucarian in relationship by Barry and his contemporaries. Restudy of the fossils identify them as not araucarian, but cupressaceous in relation. Wilson and Carpenter noted in 1966 that study of pollen spores and cones in the Mogathy and older Potomac Formation has suggested Metasequoia, Sequoiadendron or a related Taxodiaceae genus. Work using pyrolysis gas chromatography-mass spectroscopy published in 2000 linked the amber to the "Dammara conescales, fossil Pityoxylon woods and possibly Juniperus hypnoides foliage. Further work identified methyl callitrisate, a identifying compound of Cupressaceae, in the ambers composition.

== Paleobiology ==
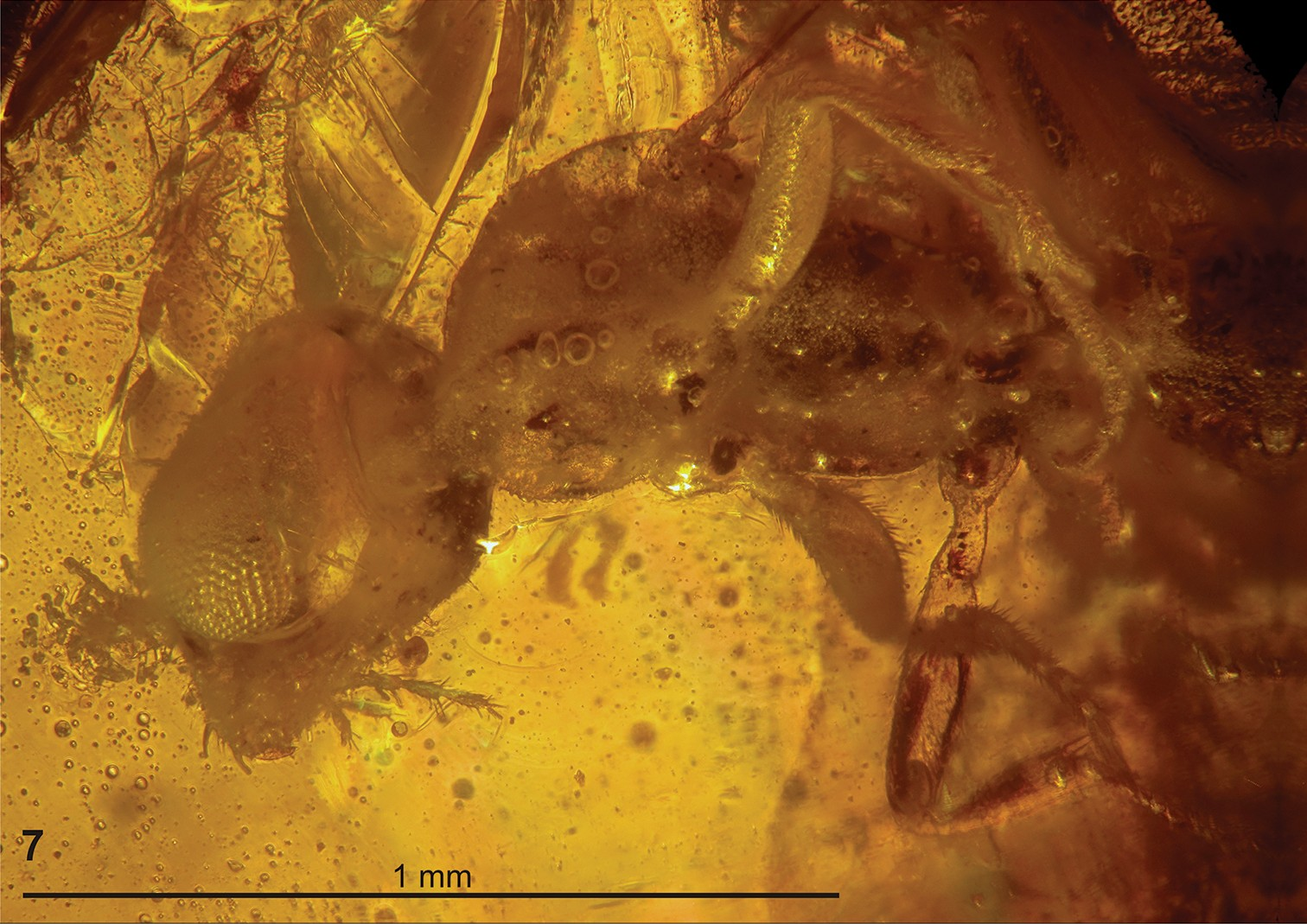
Plumalexius rasnitsyni

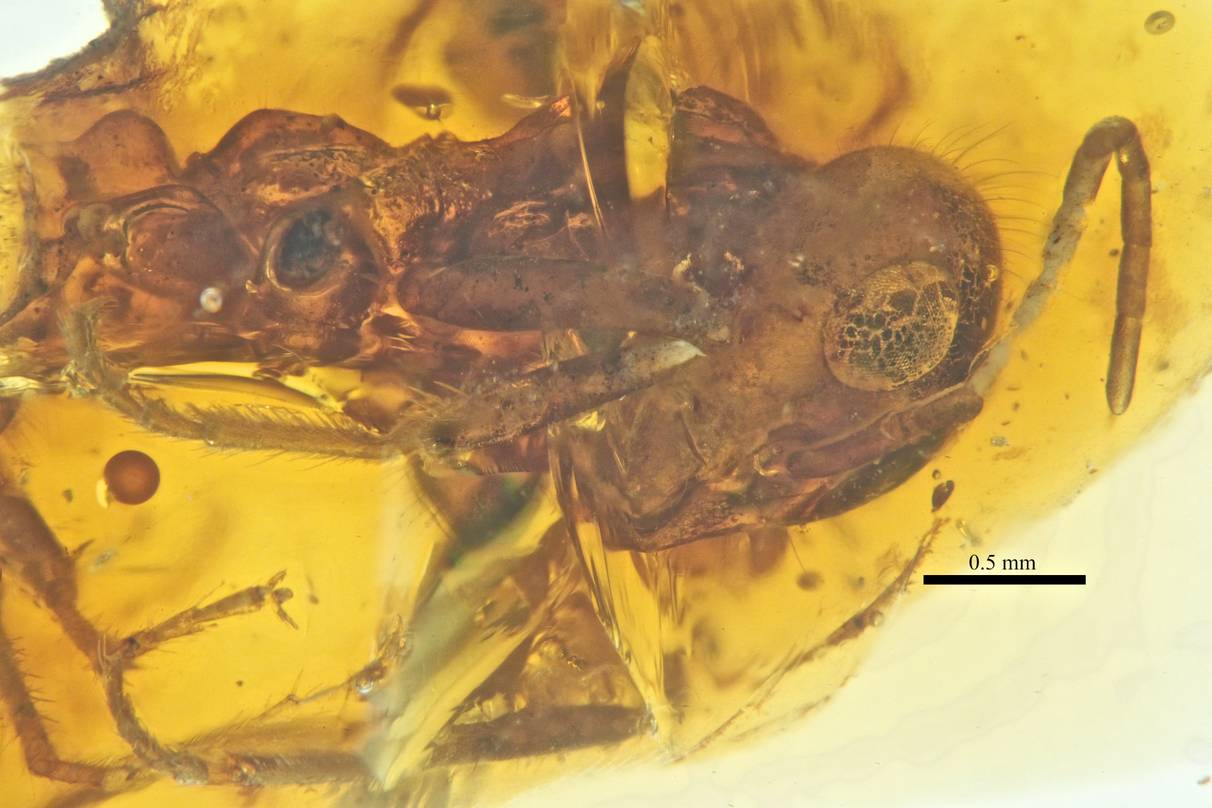
Sphecomyrma mesaki

The organisms preserved in New Jersey amber are diverse, with fungus, plant, and animal inclusions having been described. Fungi are represented by a single described Agaricales species. Plant fossils are also sparse, with conifer shoots from a Cupressaceae member, plus several undescribed flowers from a fagalean angiosperm.

Of the inclusions found in Sayreville ambers, 34% are identified as dipterans, while a 2001 paper notes that up to 20% of the inclusions found in New Jersey amber are of coccoid true bugs. In 2010 the coccoid number was reported to only be 10% of all inclusions, while nematoceran flies made up 30% of the inclusions and parasitoid wasps also constituted 30%.

In 1967 a pair of fossil ants were described from a fossil found at a New Jersey beach exposure. The ants were described as the extinct species Sphecomyrma freyi, and were the first conclusive ants identified from the Cretaceous. Since that time a series of other ant genera have been identified in the New Jersey amber.

Associated with the amber deposits at the Old Crossmans locality are fossil plants and insects preserved as fusianized charcoal remains. Ferns, gymnosperms, mosses and over one hundred angiosperm taxa have been identified from the Raritan formation lignite fossils. The plants, such as Microvictoria svitkoana and insects such as Paracupes svitkoi were entombed in the anoxic forest floor and then transformed to carbon remains by possible forest fires. Specimens of amber show evidence of heating in fire as well, having large amounts of bubbles on outer surfaces, and a milky to chalky coloration. The fires are one of possible causes for the large amount of resin production that resulted in the amber. A study published in 2011 suggested that the majority of the resin production was initiated by the boring activity of insects such as beetles. Trees that are being attacked by beetles and other insects will often produce defensive resin flows and the majority of New Jersey amber, about 70%, is grouped by the 2011 study as such. The authors indicated that fire-damaged resin specimens, ones with bubble froth and burned wood debris inclusions, were rare. Description of a fossil Ptinidae beetle in 2015 has added more evidence for the possible insect origin of the resin production.

== Taxa ==
=== Fungi ===
- Archaeomarasmius leggeti

=== Plantae ===
- Juniperus hypnoides?
- Fagales Genus and species indeterminate

=== Tardigrades ===
- Milnesium swolenskyi

=== Arachnids ===
- Araneinae genus and species indeterminate
- Carios jerseyi
- Dictynidae genus and species indeterminate
- Lagonomegops americanus
- Linyphiidae genus and species indeterminate
- Oecobius? species indeterminate
- Oonopidae genus and species indeterminate
- Orchestina species indeterminate
- Palaeosegestria lutzzii
- Segestria? species indeterminate

=== Insects ===
==== Blattodea ====
- Jantaropterix newjersey

==== Coleoptera ====
- Attagenus (Aethriostoma) turonianensis
- Cretocar luzzii
- Mesotachyporus puer.
- Phloeocharis agerata
- Sayrevilleus grimaldii
- Stegobium raritanensis

==== Dipterans ====
- Alautunmyia elongata
- Archichrysotus incompletus
- Archimelzira americana
- Archiphora pria
- Archicnephia ornithoraptor
- Cheilotrichia (Empeda) cretacea
- Cretagaster raritanensis
- Cretomicrophorus novemundus
- Culicoides bifidus
- Culicoides casei
- Culicoides grandibocus
- Culicoides truncatus
- Culicoides yoosti
- Dziedzickia nashi
- Ectrepesthoneura swolenskyi
- Electrosania cretica
- Emplita casei
- Gregikia pallida
- Heleageron grimaldii
- Hilarimorphites longimedia
- Hilarimorphites setosa
- Hilarimorphites superba
- Hilarimorphites yeatesi
- Izleiina spinitibialis
- Leptoconops (Leptoconops) copiosus
- Leptoconops (Leptoconops) curvachelus
- Limonia dillonae
- Nedocosia novacaesarea
- Neoturonius cretatus
- Neoturonius vetus
- Palaeobrachypogon grandiforceps
- Prioriphora casei
- Prioriphora luzzii
- Protoculicoides globosus (syn=Atriculicoides globosus)
- Stilobezzia kurthi
- Turonempis styx
- Xenosycorax engeli
- Xenotrichomyia newjerseyiensis

==== Ephemeroptera ====
- Amerogenia macrops
- Aureophlebia sinitshenkovae
- Borephemera goldmani
- Cretomitarcys luzzii
- Palaeometropus cassus

==== Hemiptera ====
- Eomatsucoccus casei
- Grimaldiella gregaria
- Grimaldiella resinophila
- Jersaphis luzzii
- Jersicoccus kurthi
- Koteya luzzii
- Liadopsylla hesperia
- Labiococcus joosti
- Solicoccus nascimbenei
- Steingelia cretacea
- Turonicoccus bearsdleyi
- Turonicoccus grimaldii
- Perforissus muiri
- Postopsyllidium emilyae
- Vianagramma goldmani
- Vianathauma pericarti

==== Hymenopterans ====
- Archaeostephanus
- Archaeromma carnifex
- Archaeromma gibsoni
- Boreobythus turonius
- Cretotrigona prisca
- Electrobaissa omega
- Elasmophron kurthi
- Grimaldivania ackermani
- Newjersevania casei
- Newjersevania nascimbenei
- Henopelecinus pygmaeus
- Tagsmiphron muesebecki
- Tagsmiphron gigas
- Tagsmiphron ascalaphus
- Plumalexiidae
- Plumalexius rasnitsyni
- Protorhyssalus goldmani
- Spathopria sayrevillensis

===== Formicidae =====
- Baikuris casei
- Brownimecia clavata
- Kyromyrma neffi
- Sphecomyrma freyi
- Sphecomyrma mesaki
- Baikuris casei

==== Mantodea ====
- Ambermantis wozniaki
- Jersimantis luzzii

==== Neuroptera ====
- Jersimantispa
- Rhachibermissa splendida

==== Psocopterans ====
- Jerseyempheria grimaldii

==== Raphidioptera ====
- Mesoraphidia luzzii

==== Trichoptera ====
- Agraylea (Nanoagraylea) cretaria
- Wormaldia praecursor

=== Vertebrata ===
Aves genus and species indeterminate
