= Cretomicrophorus =

Cretomicrophorus Temporal range: Upper Cretaceous, 94.3–84.9 Ma

Scientific classification
- Kingdom: Animalia
- Phylum: Arthropoda
- Clade: Pancrustacea
- Class: Insecta
- Order: Diptera
- Family: Dolichopodidae
- Subfamily: Parathalassiinae
- Genus: †Cretomicrophorus; Negrobov, 1978

Type species
- †Cretomicrophorus rohdendorfi Negrobov, 1978

Synonyms
- Jantardachia Zherichin, 1978 (nomen nudum)

Extinct genus of flies

Cretomicrophorus is an extinct genus of flies in the family Dolichopodidae from the Upper Cretaceous of Russia, France and the United States. The generic name is a combination of the Latin word creta ("chalk") and the generic name Microphorus.

== Species ==
The genus contains three species:

- †Cretomicrophorus novemundus Grimaldi & Cumming, 1999 – New Jersey amber, Turonian
- †Cretomicrophorus piolencensis Nel, Garrouste & Daugeron, 2017 – Piolenc amber, France, Santonian
- †Cretomicrophorus rohdendorfi Negrobov, 1978 – Taymyr amber, Coniacian/Santonian
