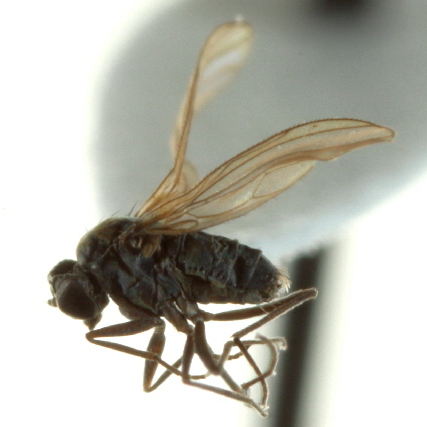
- Microphorella vockerothi

Scientific classification
- Kingdom: Animalia
- Phylum: Arthropoda
- Class: Insecta
- Order: Diptera
- Family: Dolichopodidae
- Subfamily: Parathalassiinae
- Genus: Microphorella; Becker, 1909

Type species
- Microphorus praecox Loew, 1864

= Microphorella =

Genus of flies

Microphorella is a genus of flies in the family Dolichopodidae. It is currently considered both paraphyletic and polyphyletic, and several species groups may need to be recognised as subgenera or genera.

== Species ==
Species groups as defined by Cumming & Brooks (2019):

- Microphorella short R_{1} species group:
  - three undescribed species from western North America
  - †Microphorella fragilis Cumming & Greenwalt in Greenwalt et al., 2022 – Middle Eocene, Kishenehn Formation
- Microphorella malaysiana species group:
  - Microphorella bira Shamshev & Grootaert, 2004 – Sulawesi
  - Microphorella malaysiana Shamshev & Grootaert, 2004 – Thailand, Singapore, Indonesia
  - Microphorella papuana Shamshev & Grootaert, 2004 – Papua New Guinea
  - Microphorella satunensis Shamshev & Grootaert, 2004 – Thailand
- Microphorella irwini species group:
  - Microphorella irwini Brooks & Cumming, 2023 – South Africa (Western Cape Province)
- Microphorella emiliae species group:
  - Microphorella emiliae Shamshev, 2004 – Far East Russia (Sakhalin and Kuril Islands)
- Microphorella iota species group:
  - Microphorella iota Colless, 1964 – Australia (Australian Capital Territory and New South Wales)
- Microphorella bungle species group:
  - Microphorella bungle Brooks & Cumming, 2022 – Australia: New South Wales (Warrumbungle National Park)
  - Microphorella viticula Brooks & Cumming, 2022 – Australia: New South Wales (Blue Mountains National Park)
- Microphorella amorimi species group:
  - Microphorella amorimi Brooks & Cumming, 2023 – Chile (Maule Region)
- Microphorella chillcotti species group:
  - Microphorella chillcotti Brooks & Cumming, 2012 – Canada (Alberta, British Columbia), United States (Washington)
  - Microphorella vockerothi Brooks & Cumming, 2012 – Canada (Yukon)
- Microphorella curtipes species group:
  - Microphorella beckeri (Strobl, 1910) – Central Europe
  - Microphorella curtipes (Becker, 1910) – north Italy, Corsica, Sardinia
  - ?Microphorella ulrichi Gatt, 2003 – Tunisia, Morocco
- Microphorella chiragra species group:
  - Microphorella chiragra Melander, 1927 – United States
  - Microphorella longitarsis Melander, 1927 – United States
  - Microphorella ornatipes Melander, 1927 – United States
  - 11 undescribed species from western North America
- Microphorella acroptera species group:
  - Microphorella acroptera Melander, 1927 – United States
  - Microphorella tubifera Melander, 1927 – United States
  - nine undescribed species from western North America
- Genus Microphorella s.str.:
  - Microphorella cassari Gatt, 2011 – Tunisia
  - Microphorella ebejeri Gatt, 2012 – Israel
  - Microphorella praecox (Loew, 1864) – Europe
  - Microphorella similis Brooks in Brooks & Ulrich, 2012 – Switzerland
  - Microphorella mamillata Gatt, 2012 – Tunisia

The Mediterranean species Microphorella merzi Gatt, 2003 is now classified in Eothalassius.
