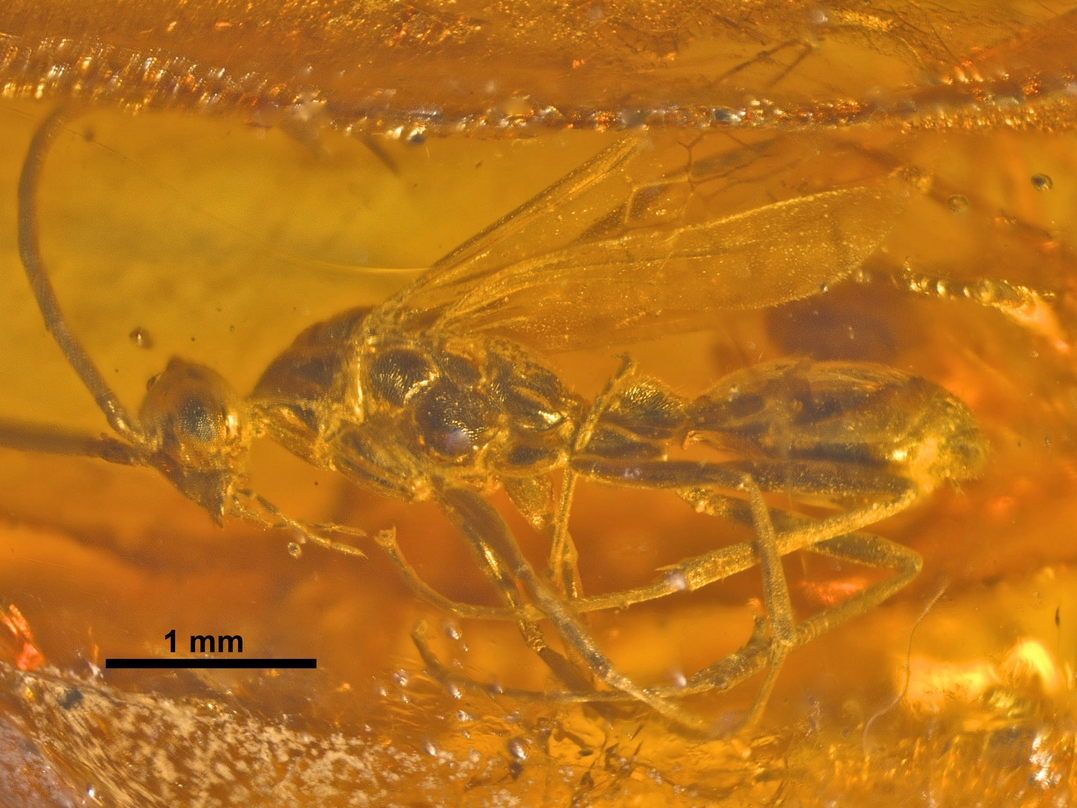
- B. mandibularis male, holotype

Scientific classification
- Kingdom: Animalia
- Phylum: Arthropoda
- Class: Insecta
- Order: Hymenoptera
- Family: Formicidae
- Subfamily: †Sphecomyrminae
- Tribe: †Sphecomyrmini
- Genus: †Baikuris; Dlussky, 1987

Type species
- Baikuris mandibularis

Species
- B. casei Grimaldi, Agosti & Carpenter, 1997; B. mandibularis Dlussky, 1987; B. maximus Perrichot, 2015; B. mirabilis Dlussky, 1987; B. ocellantis Sosiak et al., 2024

= Baikuris =

Baikuris Temporal range: Albian–Campanian, 100–72.1 Ma

Extinct genus of ants

Baikuris is an extinct genus of ant in the Formicidae subfamily Sphecomyrminae, and is currently placed in the tribe Sphecomyrmini. The genus contains four described species: the type species Baikuris mandibularis, along with Baikuris casei, Baikuris maximus, Baikuris mirabilis, B. ocellantis.

== History and classification ==
The type species B. mandibularis along with B. mirabilis were identified from adults preserved as inclusion in Taimyr amber. The fossils of both species were collected on an expedition to the Taimyr peninsula. The ambers of the peninsula occur in the upper levels of the Kheta Formation, which is exposed in a number of locations in the Taimyr region. Age estimates of the Kheta Formation are between the Coniacian and Santonian, and the ambers are found consistently in the upper most units, giving a Santonian age range for the inclusions. Based on the flora and fauna of the Ledyanaya and Mutino Formations which surround the Kheta formation, the paleoforest likely has a humid and warm temperate climate with the tees growing along river banks. While the resin producing trees have not been identified, the resins were likely dropped into the river systems and buried quickly in deltaic sediments.

Both the holotype and the second specimen for B. casei are adult males which have been preserved as inclusions in transparent chunks of New Jersey amber. The amber specimens were recovered from deposits of the South Amboy Fire Clay, part of the Raritan Formation. New Jersey amber has been dated to approximately 90 to 94 mya, placing it in the Turonian of the Late Cretaceous. Analysis of the amber composition indicates it originated as cupressaceous resins which were deposited in lagoons and salt water marshes along the Cretaceous eastern seaboard.

The fossil of B. maximus was discovered preserved as an inclusion in a transparent chunk of Charentese amber. The amber is thought to have been formed from resins of the extinct Pinales tree family Cheirolepidiaceae and possibly from the living family Araucariaceae. Paleoecology based on Charentese amber inclusions indicate a shore line mangrove type forest that was of a subtropical to warm temperate climate, with occasional dry periods. The amber specimens are recovered from deposits exposed in quarries, road constructions, and beach exposures in the Charente-Maritime region of coastal France, notably at Archingeay. Dating of the amber has been done through pollen analysis and it is generally accepted to be approximately 100 million years old.

An additional amber specimen with partial fossils of six males of an unidentified species was described in 2013, and named as Baikuris ocellantis in 2024. The amber was recovered from sediments of the Black Creek Formation along the Neuse River in North Carolina. Early dating of the formation places North Carolina amber between 83.6 and 72.1 million years old, in the Campanian, with later refinement of the deposits giving a date of 77 million years old. These males are the youngest occurrence of Baikurus identified, and they are of similar age to the Canadian Grassy Lake amber, though Baikurus has not been found in that amber. Both the North Carolina and B. casei males are preserved as groups of winged males, indicating that the genus displayed colonial behavior and likely had daytime nuptial fights similar to modern ants.

== Description ==
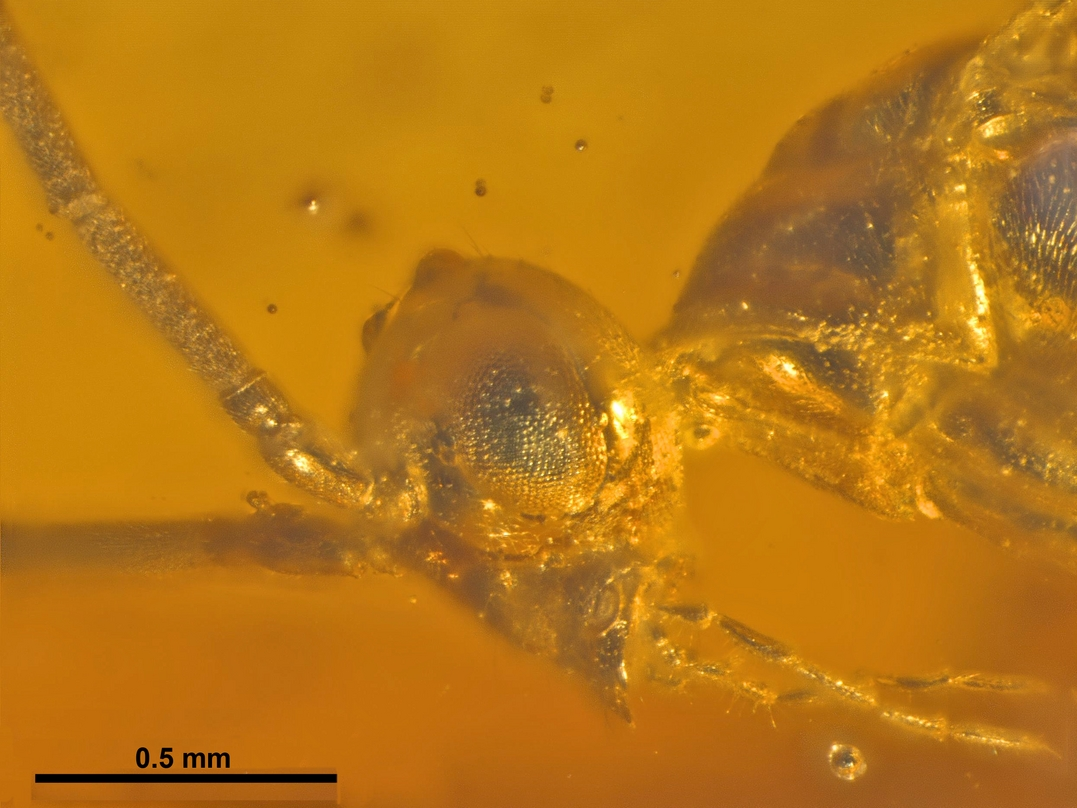
B. mandibularis head in profile

The genus is known from adult males preserved in amber only. All species of Baikuris have kidney to oval shaped eyes. The narrow mandibles have a chewing edge that are parallel to each other and lacking teeth. At the base of the outer mandible surface is a ridge and oval area that may be the opening for the mandibular gland. The labial palps, visible on the B. casei fossil, have four segments, while the maxillary palps are elongated and have six segments each. On both the mid and hind leg sets, the end of the femurs have developed into additional trochantellus segments.

=== B. casei ===
Adult males of B. casei are approximately 7.5 mm (0.30 in) and fore-wings that are 5 mm (0.20 in). Unlike males of B. mandibularis and B. miribilis, the compound eyes of B. casei are oval in shape. Also in contrast, B. casei fore-wings do not have any crossveins between the cells 1r and 2r. The antennae have 13 segment total, with segment three being the longest and the pedicel being the shortest.

The specific epithet casei was coined in honor of Gerard R. Case, who collected New Jersey amber from a number of localities between 1962 and 1986 and who worked to get the ambers studied in depth.

=== B. mandibularis ===
The three males described are all included in a single piece of amber labeled PIN 3730/5. The average length of the three is between 4–5 mm (0.16–0.20 in), the smallest of the described species. The approximately 3 mm (0.12 in) fore wings of the holotype show several areas of folding and deformation. The area of the fore wing extending from the wing tip to the apex of the pterostigma curves away from the body towards the amber surface. The lower edge of the wing on the apical side of the anal vein is curved in towards the body.

=== B. maximus ===
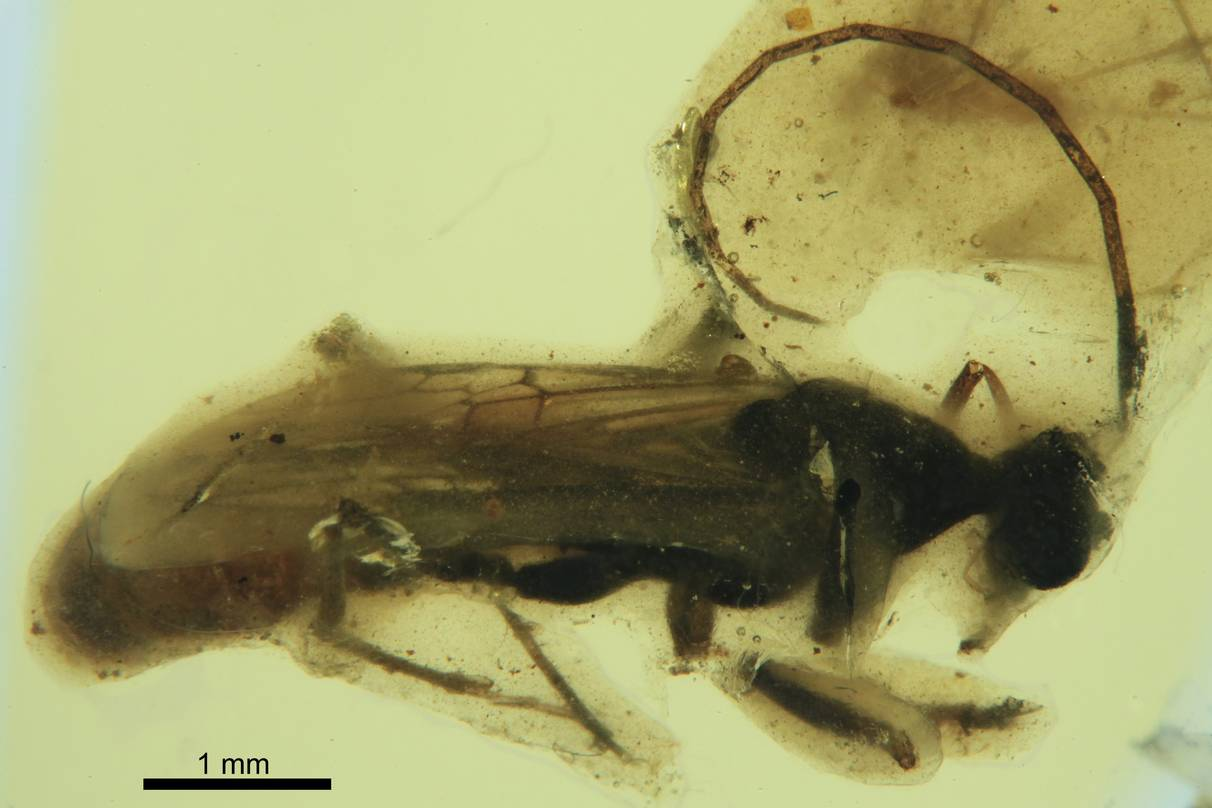
B. maximus holotype

B. maximus is distinct from the other three species in that the males are distinctly larger at 11.5 mm (0.45 in), while the other species are at most 8 mm (0.31 in). There is also a distinct downward projection on the underside of the petiole node. The antennae are 10.5 mm (0.41 in) long with a filiform structure to the segments, though only the left antenna is preserved. The clypeus and mandibles are partially obscured and details difficult to distinguish. The mandibles seem to be small, with straight sides and having a small tooth just below the tip end.

The species name was taken from the Latin maximus, which translates as "biggest" in reference to the size of the species.

=== B. mirabilis ===
This Taimyr species is described from a single partial male in amber specimen PIN 3730/8. The holotype has a total length of around 8 mm (0.31 in), and the petiole is distinctly elongated. The wings are preserved, though the veination is faint in many areas, such as the r-rs vein and the 3cu vein. The fore wings are an estimated 4.7 mm (0.19 in) long and show distinct darkening in the middle area. As a result of cleavages both the base and tip areas of the left fore wing are missing. The right wing is complete and distinct, despite the inward curving of the wing tip area. There are at least twelve hamuli on the wing, but fissures obscure the wing so a total number cannot be determined.

=== B. ocellantis ===
The B. ocellantis fossils from North Carolina have a mix of features seen in both the two Taimyr amber species and in B. casei. Like B. mirabilis and B. mandibularis the costal vein in the fore wing extends to the pterostigma, while it does not it B. casei. The eyes of the North Carolina fossils are oval in outline though, which is only seen in B. casei and not the Taimyr amber species. Unlike any of the other Baikuris species, the North Carolina fossils have short labial and long maxillary palps. The combination of characters is not seen in any of the other species, and they were not placed into a new species in the 2013 paper, and did not get formally named until 2024.
