= Avenaphora =

Avenaphora Temporal range: 130.0–84.9 Ma

Scientific classification
- Kingdom: Animalia
- Phylum: Arthropoda
- Class: Insecta
- Order: Diptera
- Family: Dolichopodidae
- Subfamily: Microphorinae
- Genus: †Avenaphora; Grimaldi & Cumming, 1999

Type species
- †Avenaphora hispida Grimaldi & Cumming, 1999

Extinct genus of flies

Avenaphora is an extinct genus of flies in the family Dolichopodidae. It is known from the Cretaceous of Lebanon and France.

Avenaphora is a Dolichopodidae sensu lato of uncertain affinities. It was originally placed in the subfamily Microphorinae by Grimaldi and Cumming in 1999, but the authors suggested that it could actually have a closer affinity with Parathalassiinae or Dolichopodidae sensu stricto. A later article published in 2017 suggested that Avenaphora actually has more similarities to the Parathalassiinae than the Microphorinae or Dolichopodidae s.str., but the authors did not place the genus in the Parathalassiinae as it does not have clear synapomorphy with them.

== Species ==
The genus contains two species:

- †Avenaphora gallica Nel, Garrouste & Daugeron, 2017 – Piolenc amber, France, Early Santonian
- †Avenaphora hispida Grimaldi & Cumming, 1999 – Lebanese amber, Barremian
