= Parathalassius =

Scientific classification
- Kingdom: Animalia
- Phylum: Arthropoda
- Clade: Pancrustacea
- Class: Insecta
- Order: Diptera
- Family: Dolichopodidae
- Subfamily: Parathalassiinae
- Genus: Parathalassius; Mik, 1891

Type species
- Parathalassius blasigii Mik, 1891

Genus of flies

Parathalassius is a genus of flies in the family Dolichopodidae. It is found along sandy sea coasts in both the Palaearctic and Nearctic realms. The name "Parathalassius" is of Greek origin, and can be translated as "near the sea".

== Species ==
- Parathalassius abela Brooks & Cumming, 2017
- Parathalassius aldrichi Melander, 1906
- Parathalassius blasigii Mik, 1891
- Parathalassius candidatus Melander, 1906
- Parathalassius dilatus Brooks & Cumming, 2017
- Parathalassius infuscatus Brooks & Cumming, 2017
- Parathalassius maritimus Shamshev, 1998
- Parathalassius melanderi Cole, 1912
- Parathalassius midas Brooks & Cumming, 2017
- Parathalassius sinclairi Brooks & Cumming, 2017
- Parathalassius socali Brooks & Cumming, 2017
- Parathalassius susanae Brooks & Cumming, 2017
- Parathalassius ulrichi Shamshev, 1998
- Parathalassius uniformus Brooks & Cumming, 2017
- Parathalassius wheeleri Brooks & Cumming, 2017

Parathalassius capensis Smith, 1972 was moved to Plesiothalassius.
