= Neothalassius =

Scientific classification
- Kingdom: Animalia
- Phylum: Arthropoda
- Clade: Pancrustacea
- Class: Insecta
- Order: Diptera
- Family: Dolichopodidae
- Subfamily: Parathalassiinae
- Genus: Neothalassius; Brooks & Cumming, 2016

Type species
- Neothalassius triton Brooks & Cumming, 2016

Genus of flies

Neothalassius is a genus of flies in the family Dolichopodidae from Chile. It was recorded by Brooks & Cumming (2011) from the region, but was undescribed until 2016.

== Species ==
- Neothalassius triton Brooks & Cumming, 2016
- Neothalassius villosus Brooks & Cumming, 2016
