= Anthalia schoenherri =

Scientific classification
- Kingdom: Animalia
- Phylum: Arthropoda
- Class: Insecta
- Order: Diptera
- Family: Hybotidae
- Subfamily: Oedaleinae
- Genus: Anthalia
- Species: A. schoenherri

Binomial name
- Anthalia schoenherri Zetterstedt, 1838

Species of fly

Anthalia schoenherri is a species of hybotid dance fly in the family Hybotidae.

== Distribution ==
Europe, United States.
