= Curvus khuludi =

Curvus khuludi Temporal range: Lower Cretaceous (Albian), 112.6–99.7 Ma

Scientific classification
- Domain: Eukaryota
- Kingdom: Animalia
- Phylum: Arthropoda
- Class: Insecta
- Order: Diptera
- Family: Dolichopodidae
- Subfamily: Microphorinae
- Genus: †Curvus; Kaddumi, 2005
- Species: †C. khuludi

Binomial name
- †Curvus khuludi Kaddumi, 2005

Extinct species of fly

Curvus khuludi is an extinct species of fly from the Lower Cretaceous of Jordan, belonging to the family Dolichopodidae. It is the only member of the genus Curvus.
