= Amphithalassius =

Scientific classification
- Kingdom: Animalia
- Phylum: Arthropoda
- Class: Insecta
- Order: Diptera
- Family: Dolichopodidae
- Subfamily: Parathalassiinae
- Genus: Amphithalassius; Ulrich, 1991

Type species
- Amphithalassius piricornis Ulrich, 1991

Genus of flies

Amphithalassius is a genus of flies in the family Dolichopodidae. It is found along sandy sea coasts in South Africa. It contains two described species, and three undescribed species known only from females. It is closely related to Plesiothalassius.

== Species ==
- Amphithalassius latus Ulrich, 1991
- Amphithalassius piricornis Ulrich, 1991
