= Anthalia bulbosa =

Scientific classification
- Kingdom: Animalia
- Phylum: Arthropoda
- Class: Insecta
- Order: Diptera
- Family: Hybotidae
- Subfamily: Oedaleinae
- Genus: Anthalia
- Species: A. bulbosa

Binomial name
- Anthalia bulbosa (Melander, 1902)

Synonyms
- Euthyneura bulbosa Melander, 1902

Species of fly

Anthalia bulbosa is a species of hybotid dance flies in the family Hybotidae. It is commonly found near Prunus serotina flowers.

== Distribution ==
Canada, United States.
