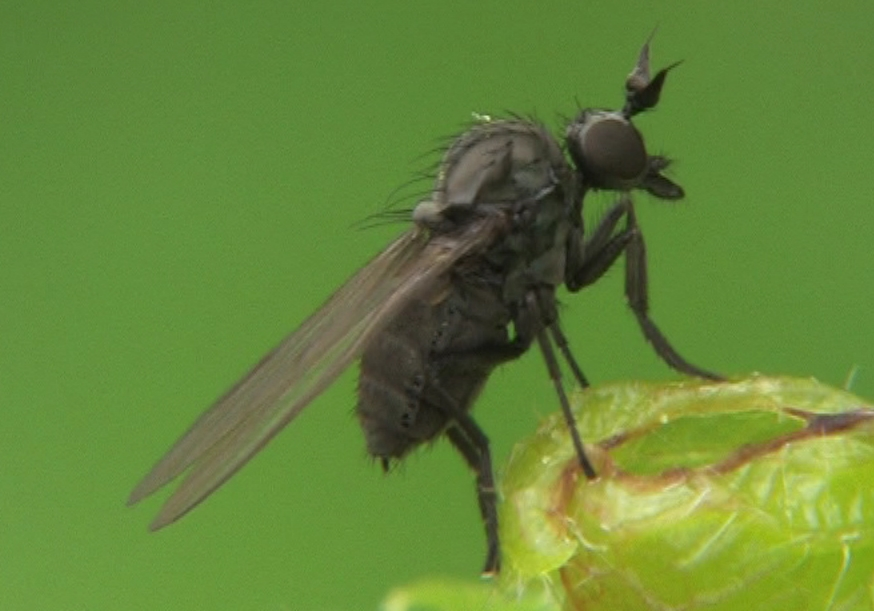
- Microphor holosericeus, female

Scientific classification
- Kingdom: Animalia
- Phylum: Arthropoda
- Class: Insecta
- Order: Diptera
- Family: Dolichopodidae
- Subfamily: Microphorinae
- Genus: Microphor; Macquart, 1827

Type species
- Microphor velutinus (= Empis holosericea Meigen, 1804) Macquart, 1827

Synonyms
- Microphorus Macquart, 1834 (unavailable name); Microphora Zetterstedt, 1842 (unavailable name); Microphorus Lundbeck, 1907 (unjustified emendation)

= Microphor =

Microphor Temporal range: Eocene–Present

Genus of flies

Microphor is a genus of flies in the family Dolichopodidae, subfamily Microphorinae.

== Species ==
At least 16 extant species are described in the genus, with nine from the Palaearctic realm, one from the Oriental realm, and five from the Nearctic realm. Three fossil species have also been described. There are also several undescribed species from the sub-Mediterranean region of Europe and Turkey, and one undescribed species from the Neotropical realm. One species from the Australasian realm, Microphor hiemalis, has also been described, but it does not appear to be cogeneric and may not belong in the subfamily Microphorinae.

- Microphor anomalus (Meigen, 1824)
- Microphor bilineatus (Melander, 1902)
- Microphor crassipes Macquart, 1827
- †Microphor defunctus Handlirsch, 1910 – Allenby Formation, Canada, Ypresian
- Microphor discalis Melander, 1940
- †Microphor eocenica (Meunier, 1902) – Baltic amber, Eocene
- Microphor gissaricus Shamshev, 1992
- Microphor hiemalis White, 1916
- Microphor holosericeus (Meigen, 1804)
- Microphor intermedius Collin, 1961
- Microphor obscurus Coquillett, 1903
- Microphor pilimanus Strobl, 1899
- Microphor rostellatus Loew, 1864
- †Microphor rusticus (Meunier, 1908) – Baltic amber, Eocene
- Microphor sinensis Saigusa & Yang, 2003
- Microphor skevingtoni Brooks & Cumming, 2022
- Microphor strobli Chvála, 1986
- Microphor turneri Brooks & Cumming, 2022
- Microphor zimini Shamshev, 1995

Species transferred to Schistostoma:

- Microphor armipes Melander, 1928
- Microphor atratus Coquillett, 1900
- Microphor cirripes Melander, 1940
- Microphor evisceratus Melander, 1940
- Microphor isommatus Melander, 1928
- Microphor ravidus Coquillett, 1895
- Microphor ravus Melander, 1940: synonym of Schistostoma evisceratum (Melander, 1940)
- Microphor robustus Melander, 1928
- Microphor strigilifer Melander, 1940
- Microphor sycophantor (Melander, 1902)
- Microphor tacomae Melander, 1940

Species transferred to other genera:

- Microphorus crocatus Coquillett, 1900: now in Euthyneura
- Microphorus drapetoides Walker, 1849: now in Bicellaria
- Microphorus flavipilosus Coquillett, 1900: now in Iteaphila
- Microphorus gilvihirta Coquillett, 1903: now in Anthalia
- Microphorus zontaki Nowicki, 1870: now in Iteaphila
