= Chimerothalassius =

Scientific classification
- Kingdom: Animalia
- Phylum: Arthropoda
- Class: Insecta
- Order: Diptera
- Family: Dolichopodidae
- Subfamily: Parathalassiinae
- Genus: Chimerothalassius; Shamshev & Grootaert, 2003

Type species
- Chimerothalassius ismayi Shamshev & Grootaert, 2003

Genus of flies

Chimerothalassius is a genus of flies in the family Dolichopodidae. It contains five described species, two from New Zealand, two from New Caledonia and one from the Caribbean. It also contains three undescribed species, two from New Zealand and one from Costa Rica.

== Species ==
- Chimerothalassius ismayi Shamshev & Grootaert, 2003 – New Zealand
- Chimerothalassius marshalli Brooks & Cumming, 2022 – New Zealand
- Chimerothalassius riparius Brooks & Cumming, 2022 – New Caledonia
- Chimerothalassius runyoni Brooks & Cumming, 2018 – Montserrat, Dominica
- Chimerothalassius sinclairi Brooks & Cumming, 2022 – New Caledonia
