= Retinitus =

Retinitus Temporal range: Upper Cretaceous, 85.8–84.9 Ma

Scientific classification
- Kingdom: Animalia
- Phylum: Arthropoda
- Clade: Pancrustacea
- Class: Insecta
- Order: Diptera
- Family: Dolichopodidae
- Subfamily: Parathalassiinae
- Genus: †Retinitus; Negrobov, 1978
- Species: †R. nervosus

Binomial name
- †Retinitus nervosus Negrobov, 1978

Extinct genus of flies

Retinitus is an extinct genus of flies in the family Dolichopodidae. It contains only one species, Retinitus nervosus, from the Upper Cretaceous of the Taymyr Peninsula in Russia. The generic name comes from "retinite" (fossil resin), and the specific name comes from the Latin word nervus.
