= Archichrysotus =

Archichrysotus Temporal range: Upper Cretaceous, 94.3–70.6 Ma

Scientific classification
- Kingdom: Animalia
- Phylum: Arthropoda
- Clade: Pancrustacea
- Class: Insecta
- Order: Diptera
- Family: Dolichopodidae
- Subfamily: Parathalassiinae
- Genus: †Archichrysotus; Negrobov, 1978

Type species
- †Archichrysotus hennigi Negrobov, 1978

Extinct genus of flies

Archichrysotus is an extinct genus of flies in the family Dolichopodidae. The generic name is a combination of the Greek prefix archi- ("the first") and the generic name Chrysotus. The genus is known from Upper Cretaceous amber from the Taymyr Peninsula in Russia, New Jersey in the United States and Cedar Lake in Manitoba, Canada.

== Species ==
The genus contains four species:

- †Archichrysotus hennigi Negrobov, 1978 – Taymyr amber, Coniacian/Santonian
- †Archichrysotus incompletus Grimaldi & Cumming, 1999 – New Jersey amber, Turonian
- †Archichrysotus manitobus Grimaldi & Cumming, 1999 – Canadian amber, Campanian
- †Archichrysotus minor Negrobov, 1978 – Taymyr amber, Coniacian/Santonian
