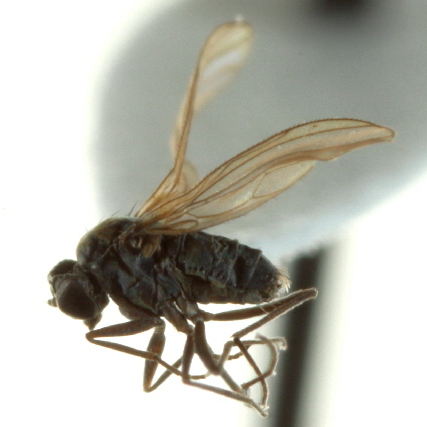
- Microphorella vockerothi

Scientific classification
- Kingdom: Animalia
- Phylum: Arthropoda
- Clade: Pancrustacea
- Class: Insecta
- Order: Diptera
- Family: Dolichopodidae
- Subfamily: Parathalassiinae; Chvála, 1981

Genera
- see text

= Parathalassiinae =

Parathalassiinae Temporal range: Late Cretaceous–Recent

Subfamily of flies

Parathalassiinae is a subfamily of flies in the family Dolichopodidae. It is part of an extended concept of the family, Dolichopodidae sensu lato, and forms a monophyletic group with Dolichopodidae sensu stricto. It was once placed provisionally in the subfamily Microphorinae as the tribe Parathalassiini.

According to a molecular phylogenetic analysis of the family Dolichopodidae by Germann et al. (2011), there is strong evidence for placing Parathalassiinae within Dolichopodidae sensu stricto.

== Genera ==
The subfamily currently includes 12 genera:

- Amphithalassius Ulrich, 1991
- †Archichrysotus Negrobov, 1978 – Late Cretaceous
- Chimerothalassius Shamshev & Grootaert, 2003
- †Cretomicrophorus Negrobov, 1978 – Late Cretaceous
- †Electrophorella Cumming & Brooks, 2002 – Baltic amber, Eocene
- Eothalassius Shamshev & Grootaert, 2005
- Microphorella Becker, 1909
- Neothalassius Brooks & Cumming, 2016
- Parathalassius Mik, 1891
- Plesiothalassius Ulrich, 1991
- †Retinitus Negrobov, 1978 – Taymyr amber, Coniacian/Santonian
- Thalassophorus Saigusa, 1986
