= Thalassophorus =

Scientific classification
- Kingdom: Animalia
- Phylum: Arthropoda
- Class: Insecta
- Order: Diptera
- Family: Dolichopodidae
- Subfamily: Parathalassiinae
- Genus: Thalassophorus; Saigusa, 1986

Type species
- Thalassophorus spinipennis Saigusa, 1986

Genus of flies

Thalassophorus is a genus of flies belonging to the family Dolichopodidae. It is known from Japan and North America.

== Species ==
Two species are included in the genus:

- Thalassophorus arnaudi Brooks & Cumming, 2011 – British Columbia, Oregon, California
- Thalassophorus spinipennis Saigusa, 1986 – Japan
