= Patapsco Formation =

Fossil-rich geologic formation on the East Coast of the United States

- Stratigraphic range: Albian–Cenomanian
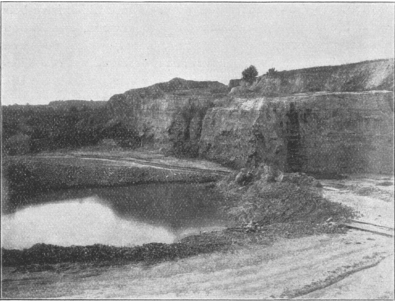
- Outcrop of the Patapsco Formation at Reynold's Mine, Anne Arundel County, Maryland showing the Arundel Formation overlain by the Patapsco Formation
- Type: Formation
- Unit of: Potomac Group
- Underlies: Raritan Formation
- Overlies: Arundel Formation
- Thickness: 200 feet (60 m)

Lithology
- Primary: clay, sand
- Other: silt

Location
- Region: Virginia, Maryland
- Country: United States

Type section
- Named for: Patapsco River
- Named by: William Bullock Clark (1897)

The Patapsco Formation is a geologic formation of varigated clays, sandy clays, and sand in Virginia, the District of Columbia, Maryland, Delaware, Pennsylvania, and in the subsurface of New Jersey. It preserves fossils such as plants and molluscs dating back to the Cretaceous period.

== See also ==
- List of fossiliferous stratigraphic units in Virginia
- List of fossiliferous stratigraphic units in Maryland
- Paleontology in Virginia
- Paleontology in Maryland
