= Anthalia =

Scientific classification
- Kingdom: Animalia
- Phylum: Arthropoda
- Clade: Pancrustacea
- Class: Insecta
- Order: Diptera
- Family: Hybotidae
- Subfamily: Oedaleinae
- Genus: Anthalia; Zetterstedt, 1838

Type species
- Anthalia schoenherri Zetterstedt, 1838

Genus of flies

Anthalia is a genus of flies in the family Hybotidae.

== Species ==
- Anthalia beatricella Chandler, 1992
- Anthalia brevicornis (Strobl, 1899)
- Anthalia bulbosa (Melander, 1902)
- Anthalia femorata Melander, 1928
- Anthalia flava Coquillett, 1903
- Anthalia gilvihirta (Coquillett, 1903)
- Anthalia inornata Melander, 1928
- Anthalia interrupta Melander, 1928
- Anthalia lacteipennis Melander, 1928
- Anthalia mandalota Melander, 1928
- Anthalia petiolata Melander, 1928
- Anthalia schoenherri Zetterstedt, 1838
- Anthalia scutellaris Melander, 1928
- Anthalia sinensis Saigusa & Yang, 2003
- Anthalia stigmalis Coquillett, 1903
