= Eothalassius =

Scientific classification
- Kingdom: Animalia
- Phylum: Arthropoda
- Class: Insecta
- Order: Diptera
- Family: Dolichopodidae
- Subfamily: Parathalassiinae
- Genus: Eothalassius; Shamshev & Grootaert, 2005

Type species
- Eothalassius platypalpus Shamshev & Grootaert, 2005

Genus of flies

Eothalassius is a genus of flies in the family Dolichopodidae. It contains four described species, from Southeast Asia, Papua New Guinea, Costa Rica and the Mediterranean. It also contains three undescribed species, one from New Caledonia and two from Japan.

== Species ==
- Eothalassius borkenti Cumming & Brooks, 2011 – Costa Rica
- Eothalassius gracilis Shamshev & Grootaert, 2005 – Thailand, Indonesia (Irian Jaya), Papua New Guinea
- Eothalassius merzi (Gatt, 2003) – Cyprus, Malta, Mediterranean coast of Turkey
- Eothalassius platypalpus Shamshev & Grootaert, 2005 – Papua New Guinea
