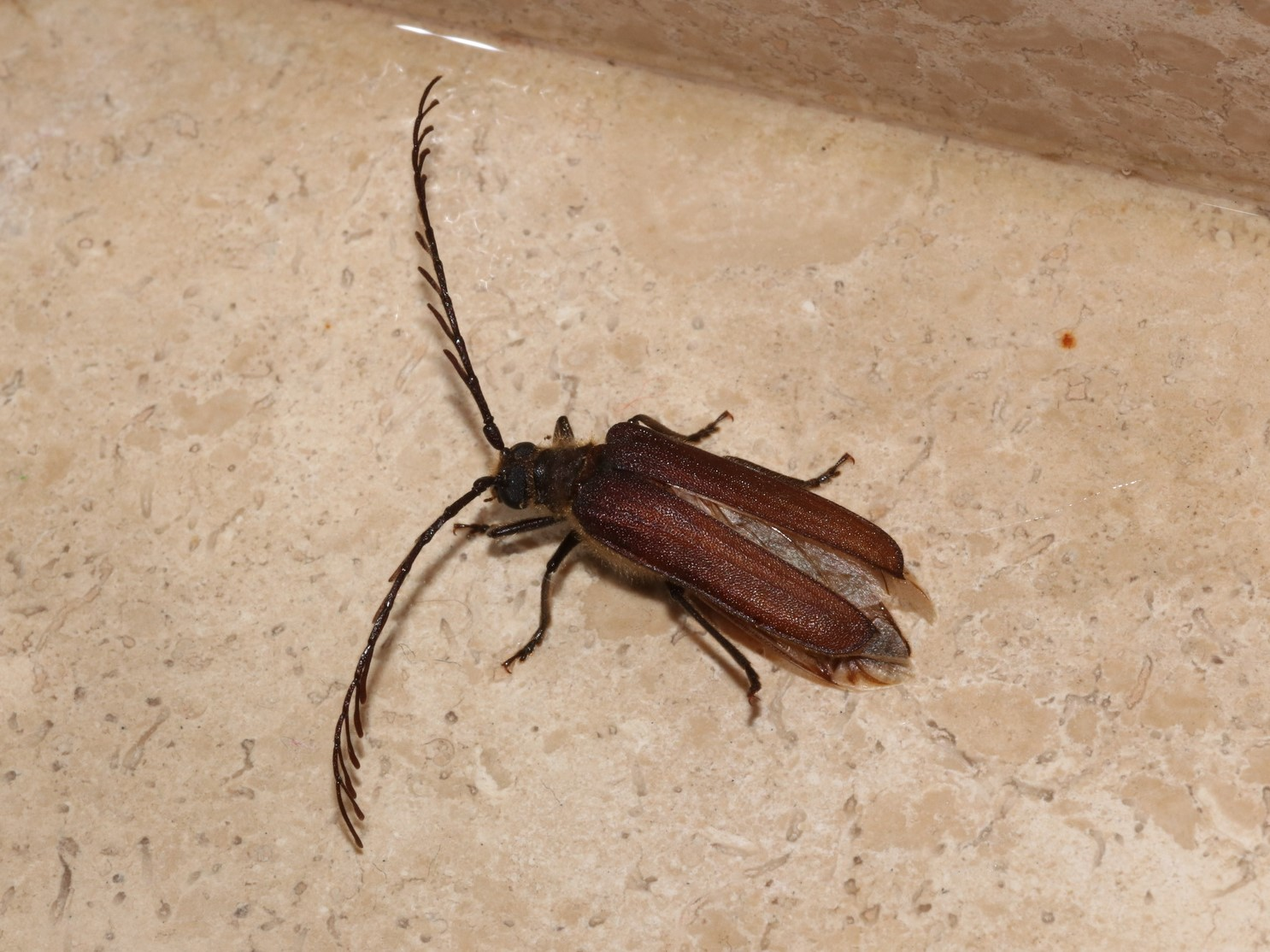
- Microplophorus magellanicus

Scientific classification
- Kingdom: Animalia
- Phylum: Arthropoda
- Clade: Pancrustacea
- Class: Insecta
- Order: Coleoptera
- Suborder: Polyphaga
- Infraorder: Cucujiformia
- Family: Cerambycidae
- Subfamily: Prioninae
- Tribe: Meroscelisini
- Genus: Microplophorus; Blanchard 1851

Synonyms
- Microphorus Chenu 1870

= Microplophorus =

Genus of beetles

Microplophorus is a genus of beetles in the family Cerambycidae, containing the following species:

- Microplophorus calverti Philippi in Germain, 1897
- Microplophorus magellanicus Blanchard in Gay, 1851
- Microplophorus penai Galileo, 1987
