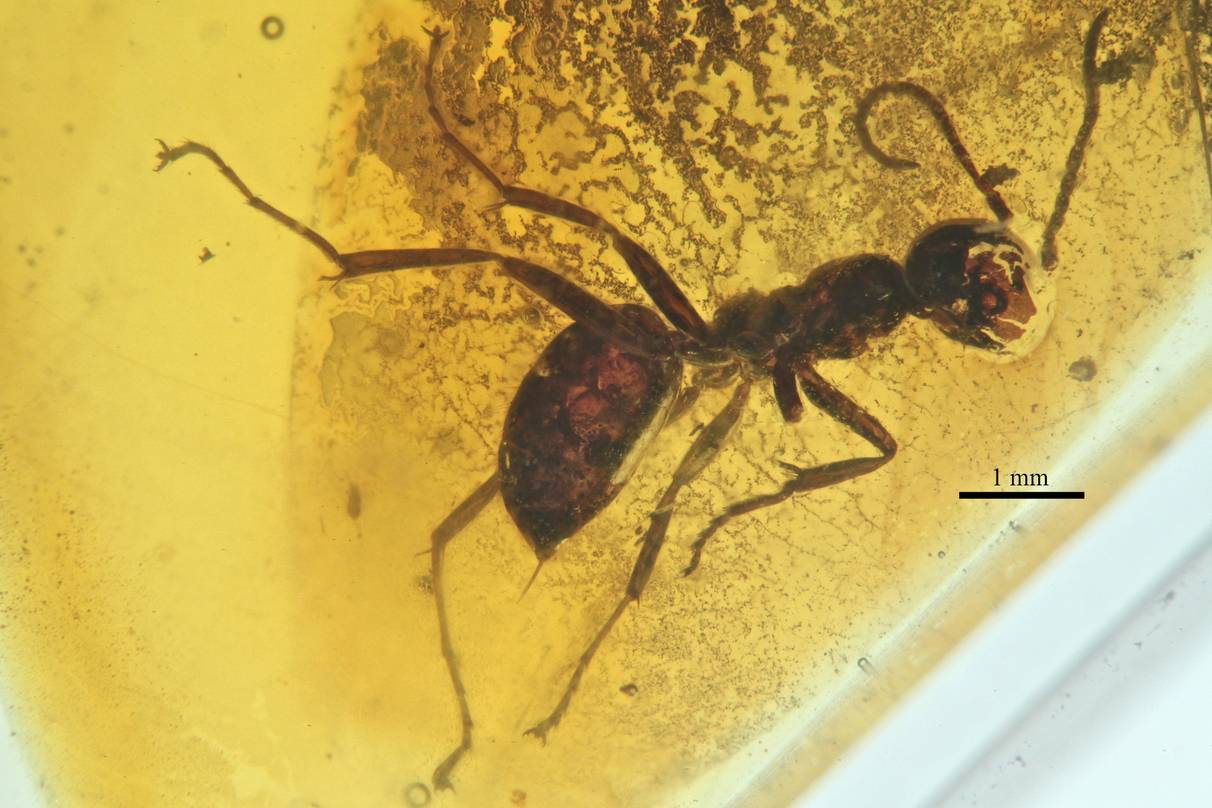
- Sphecomyrma freyi worker

Scientific classification
- Domain: Eukaryota
- Kingdom: Animalia
- Phylum: Arthropoda
- Class: Insecta
- Order: Hymenoptera
- Family: Formicidae
- Subfamily: †Sphecomyrminae; Wilson & Brown, 1967

Type genus
- †Sphecomyrma Wilson & Brown, 1967

Tribes and genera
- See text

= Sphecomyrminae =

Sphecomyrminae Temporal range: Cenomanian–Campanian

Extinct subfamily of ants

Sphecomyrminae is an extinct subfamily of ants in family Formicidae known from a series of Cretaceous fossils found in North America, Europe, and Asia. Sphecomyrminae contains eight genera, divided into two tribes Sphecomyrmini and Zigrasimeciini. The tribe Sphecomyrmini contains the six genera Armania, Cretomyrma, Gerontoformica, Orapia, Pseudarmania and Sphecomyrma; while Zigrasimeciini contains Boltonimecia and Zigrasimecia. A number of taxa have been removed from the subfamily and placed either in other subfamilies or are now treated as incertae sedis in Formicidae.

Sphecomyrminae is the most basal of the Formicidae subfamilies, but has not been included in several phylogenetic studies of the family. Symplesiomorphies of the subfamily include the structure of the antenna, which has a short basal segment and a flexible group of segments below the antenna tip. The petiole is low and rounded, with an unrestricted gaster and the presence of a metapleural gland. The subfamily is characterized by three major synapomorphies, the short pedicel, a second flagellar segment that is double the length of the other antenna segments, and the loss of the apical end of the CuA veins in the wings of adult males.

== Tribes and genera ==
A 2017 study recognized three tribes, Haidomyrmecini, Sphecomyrmini, and Zigrasimeciini and included the genera formerly placed in Armaniidae within the tribe Sphecomyrmini. Further review of the haidomyrmecins resulted in them being elevated to the separate subfamily Haidomyrmecinae and removed from Sphecomyrminae.

- Sphecomyrminae Wilson & Brown, 1967
  - Sphecomyrmini Wilson, Carpenter & Brown, 1967
    - Armania Dlussky, 1983
    - Baikuris Dlussky, 1987
    - Cretomyrma Dlussky, 1975
    - Dlusskyidris Bolton, 1994
    - Orapia Dlussky, Brothers & Rasnitsyn, 2004
    - Pseudarmania Dlussky, 1983
    - Sphecomyrma Wilson & Brown, 1967

The genus Sphecomyrmodes was formerly placed into Sphecomyrmini; however, in 2016, it was made a synonym of the stem group genus Gerontoformica, which was considered incertae sedis in Formicidae at the time. The former tribe Zigrasimeciini is now considered to comprise the separate subfamily Zigrasimeciinae.
