= Plesiothalassius =

Scientific classification
- Kingdom: Animalia
- Phylum: Arthropoda
- Class: Insecta
- Order: Diptera
- Family: Dolichopodidae
- Subfamily: Parathalassiinae
- Genus: Plesiothalassius; Ulrich, 1991

Type species
- Parathalassius capensis Smith, 1972

Genus of flies

Plesiothalassius is a genus of flies in the family Dolichopodidae. It is found along sandy sea coasts in South Africa. It contains three described species. It is closely related to Amphithalassius.

== Species ==
- Plesiothalassius capensis (Smith, 1972)
- Plesiothalassius flavus Ulrich, 1991
- Plesiothalassius natalensis Ulrich, 1991
