= Raritan Formation =

Mesozoic geologic formation containing dinosaur fossils and amber

- Stratigraphic range: Turonian
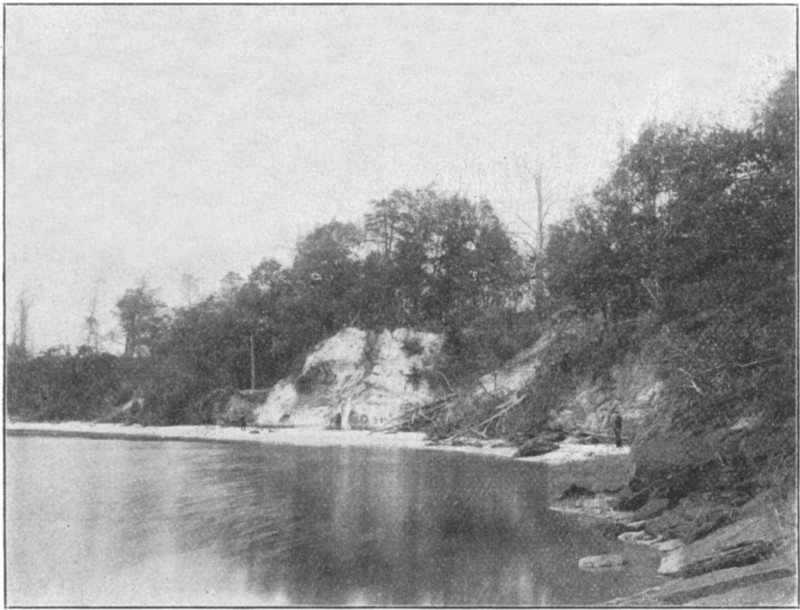
- Outcrop of the Raritan Formation near Rocky Point above Round Bay, Severn River, Anne Arundel County, Maryland
- Type: Sedimentary
- Unit of: Potomac Group
- Sub-units: Raritan Fire Clay, Farrington Sand Member, Woodbridge Clay Member, Sayreville Sand Member, South Amboy Fire Clay Member
- Underlies: Magothy Formation
- Overlies: Newark Supergroup, Patapsco Formation

Location
- Region: New Jersey, New York, Maryland
- Country: USA

Type section
- Named for: Raritan Bay
- Named by: G. H. Cook (1888)

The Raritan Formation is a Cretaceous (Turonian) sedimentary geologic formation of the Atlantic Coastal Plain.

== Overview ==
The formation was first described in 1888 by G. H. Cook, who measured sections in the vicinity of Raritan Bay in New Jersey. It was extended into Maryland by William Bullock Clark in 1893.

The formation is described in the USGS publication Tolchester folio, Maryland (1917) as follows:

The formation consists of diverse materials similar to those composing the Patapsco formation, except that, in general, the clays are not so highly colored. White and buff sands; stratified light chocolate-colored sandy clays, in places containing leaf impressions; light-colored argillaceous sands and sandy clays (Fuller's earth); and white, yellow, drab, bluish-drab, and variegated clays all occur in deposits of this age. The variegated clays are well exposed in the steep bluff at Worton Point (see photo below). The delicate pinkish tints which they present at many places have given rise to the local name "peach-blossom clays."

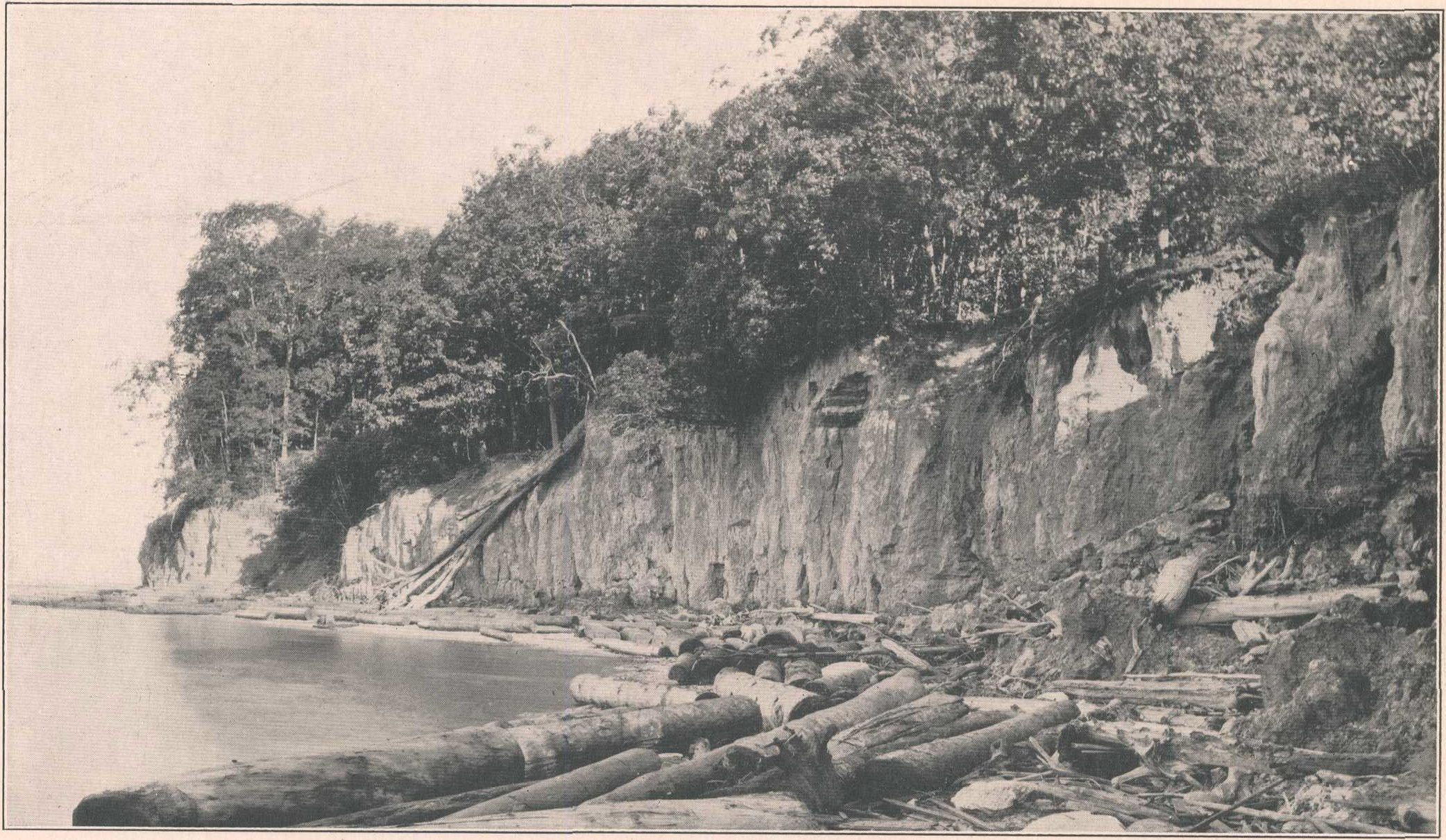
Vertically jointed clay of Raritan Formation in wave-cut cliff, Worton Point, Kent County (c. 1917)

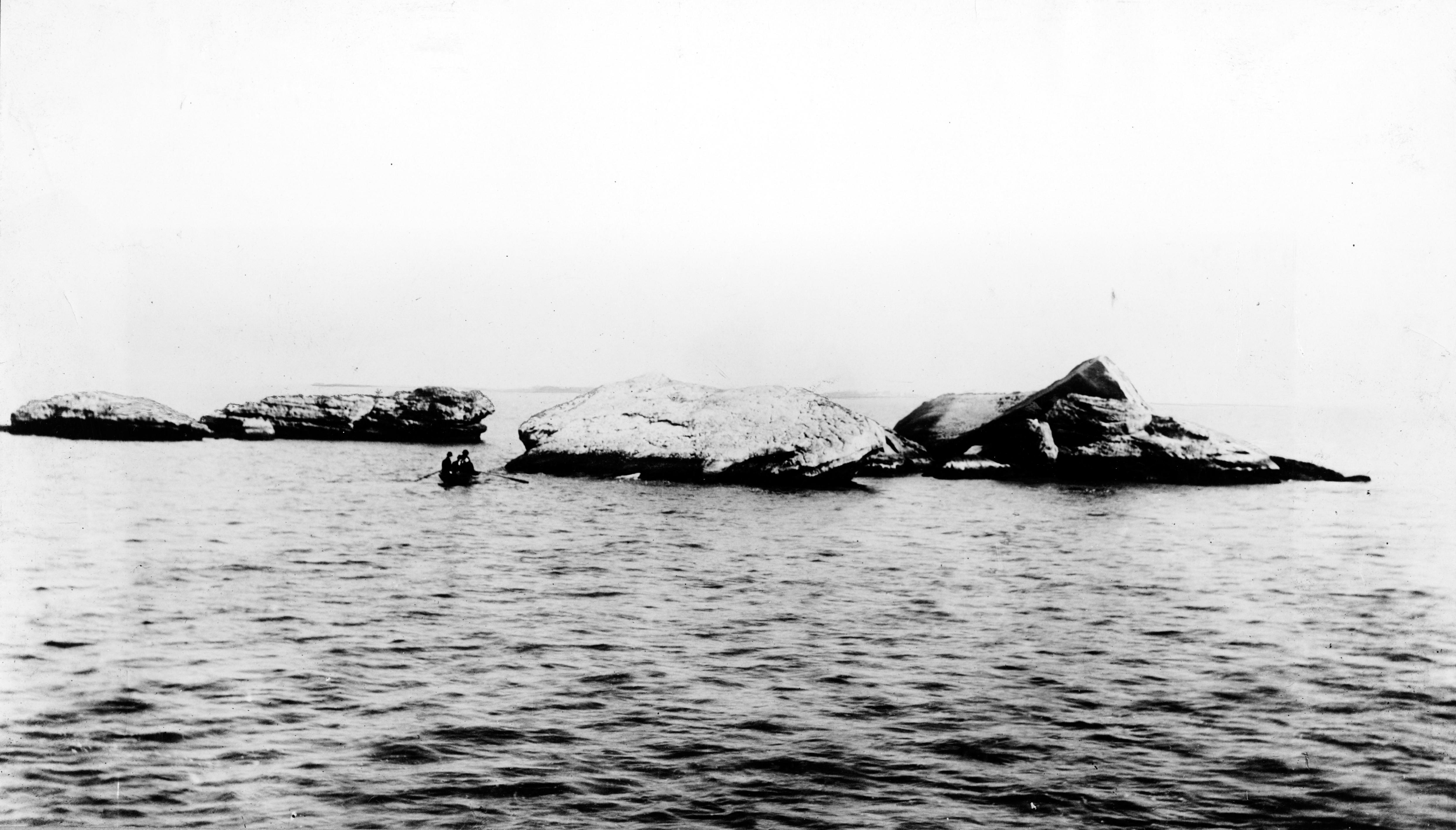
The White Rocks off of Rock Point in Anne Arundel County are composed of lithified sands of the Raritan Formation (c. 1917)

== Fossils ==
Dinosaur remains are among the fossils that have been recovered from the formation, although none have yet been referred to a specific genus. A tyrannosauroid similar to Appalachiosaurus is known from the formation.

Many plant fossils have been recovered from the Raritan. The formation hosts the New Jersey Amber deposits.

== See also ==
- List of dinosaur-bearing rock formations
  - List of stratigraphic units with indeterminate dinosaur fossils
