= Schistostoma =

Schistostoma Temporal range: Upper Cretaceous–Present

Scientific classification
- Domain: Eukaryota
- Kingdom: Animalia
- Phylum: Arthropoda
- Class: Insecta
- Order: Diptera
- Family: Dolichopodidae
- Subfamily: Microphorinae
- Genus: Schistostoma; Becker, 1902

Type species
- Schistostoma eremita Becker, 1902

Genus of flies

Schistostoma is a genus of flies in the family Dolichopodidae, subfamily Microphorinae.

== Species ==
At least 50 extant species have been described in the genus, with 16 from the Palaearctic realm, two from the Oriental realm, four from the Afrotropical realm, and 28 from the Nearctic realm. Two fossil species have also been described from Burmese amber. There are also several undescribed species from the Palaearctic realm, and one undescribed species from the Afrotropical realm.

- Schistostoma albopilosum (Becker, 1910)
- Schistostoma armipes (Melander, 1928)
- Schistostoma arnaudi Brooks & Cumming, 2022
- Schistostoma asiaticum Shamshev, 1993
- Schistostoma atratum (Coquillett, 1900)
- Schistostoma borkenti Brooks & Cumming, 2022
- Schistostoma brandbergense Shamshev & Sinclair, 2006
- †Schistostoma burmanicum Brooks, Cumming & Grimaldi, 2019 Burmese amber, Cenomanian
- Schistostoma caroleae Brooks & Cumming, 2022
- Schistostoma chloeae Brooks & Cumming, 2022
- Schistostoma cirripes (Melander, 1940)
- Schistostoma cucullatum Collin, 1949
- Schistostoma deemingi Gatt, 2014
- Schistostoma discretum Collin, 1949
- Schistostoma eremita Becker, 1902
- Schistostoma evisceratum (Melander, 1940)
- Schistostoma fitzgeraldi Brooks & Cumming, 2022
- Schistostoma flavipes Chvala, 1987
- †Schistostoma foliatum Brooks, Cumming & Grimaldi, 2019 Burmese amber, Cenomanian
- Schistostoma golbeki Shamshev, 1993
- Schistostoma grootaerti Chvala, 1987
- Schistostoma heatherae Brooks & Cumming, 2022
- Schistostoma indicum Shamshev, 2020
- Schistostoma isommatum (Melander, 1928)
- Schistostoma kalkgat Shamshev & Sinclair, 2006
- Schistostoma kovalevi Shamshev, 1993
- Schistostoma lillyae Brooks & Cumming, 2022
- Schistostoma longistylum Brooks & Cumming, 2022
- Schistostoma michaeli Brooks & Cumming, 2022
- Schistostoma mongolicum Shamshev, 1991
- Schistostoma negrobovi Shamshev, 2021
- Schistostoma nigrescens Becker, 1907
- Schistostoma nigricauda (Becker, 1908)
- Schistostoma nigrosetosum Chvala, 1987
- Schistostoma oharai Brooks & Cumming, 2022
- Schistostoma pecki Brooks & Cumming, 2022
- Schistostoma powelli Brooks & Cumming, 2022
- Schistostoma pseudoflavipes Shamshev, 1993
- Schistostoma ravidum (Coquillett, 1895)
- Schistostoma robustum (Melander, 1928)
- Schistostoma rudei Brooks & Cumming, 2022
- Schistostoma runyoni Brooks & Cumming, 2022
- Schistostoma shamshevi Brooks & Cumming, 2022
- Schistostoma sinclairi Brooks & Cumming, 2022
- Schistostoma strigilifer (Melander, 1940)
- Schistostoma stuckenbergi Chvala, 1991
- Schistostoma susanae Brooks & Cumming, 2022
- Schistostoma sycophantor (Melander, 1902)
- Schistostoma tacomae (Melander, 1940)
- Schistostoma thalhammeri Chvala, 1987
- Schistostoma truncatum (Loew, 1864)
- Schistostoma turkmenicum Shamshev, 1993
- Schistostoma yakimense (Melander, 1928)
