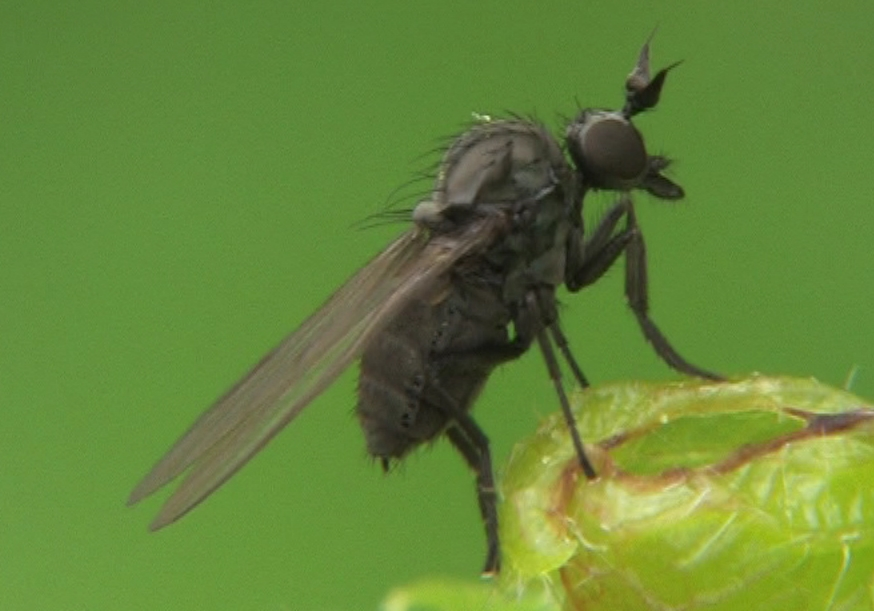
- Microphor holosericeus, female

Scientific classification
- Kingdom: Animalia
- Phylum: Arthropoda
- Class: Insecta
- Order: Diptera
- Family: Dolichopodidae
- Subfamily: Microphorinae; Collin, 1960

Genera
- See text

= Microphorinae =

Microphorinae Temporal range: Early Cretaceous–Recent

Subfamily of flies

Microphorinae is a subfamily of flies in the family Dolichopodidae. It is part of an expanded concept of the family, Dolichopodidae sensu lato, though it was previously considered a subfamily of Empididae or a family of its own.

== Genera ==
The subfamily includes seven genera, two extant and five extinct:

- †Avenaphora Grimaldi & Cumming, 1999 – Early Cretaceous
- †Curvus Kaddumi, 2005 – Jordanian amber, Albian
- †Meghyperiella Meunier, 1908 – Baltic amber and Rovno amber, Eocene
- Microphor Macquart, 1827
- †Microphorites Hennig, 1971 – Early Cretaceous-Eocene
- †Pristinmicrophor Tang, Shi, Wang & Yang, 2019 – Burmese amber, Myanmar, Cenomanian
- Schistostoma Becker, 1902
