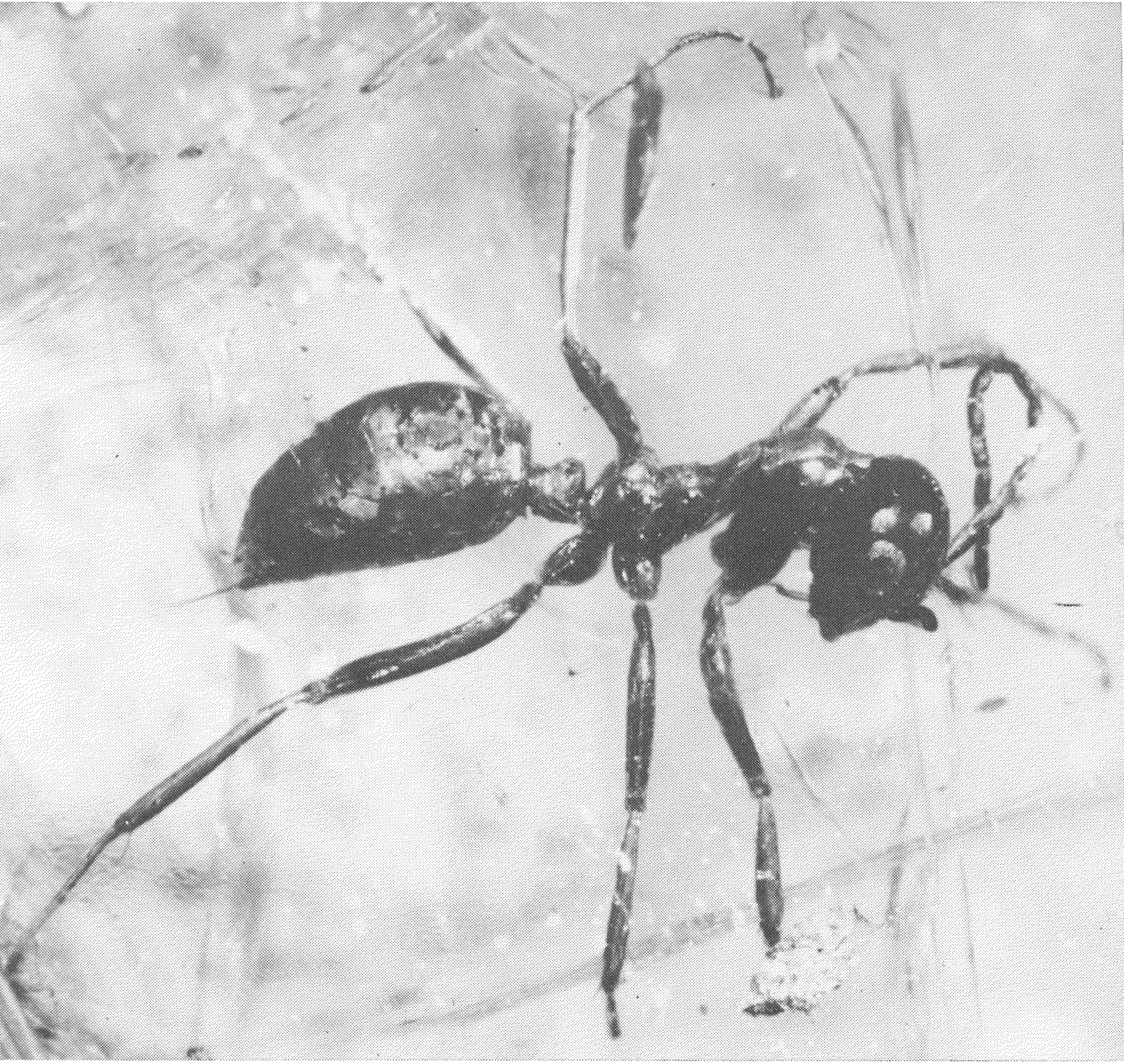
- S. freyi worker, holotype

Scientific classification
- Kingdom: Animalia
- Phylum: Arthropoda
- Clade: Pancrustacea
- Class: Insecta
- Order: Hymenoptera
- Family: Formicidae
- Subfamily: †Sphecomyrminae
- Tribe: †Sphecomyrmini
- Genus: †Sphecomyrma; Wilson & Brown, 1967

Type species
- Sphecomyrma freyi

Species
- S. canadensis Wilson, 1985; S. freyi Wilson & Brown, 1967; S. mesaki Engel & Grimaldi, 2005; S. nexa Sosiak et al., 2024'

= Sphecomyrma =

Sphecomyrma Temporal range: Turonian–Campanian, 92–79 Ma

Extinct genus of ants

Sphecomyrma is an extinct genus of ants which in the Cretaceous approximately 79 to 92 million years ago. The first specimens were collected in 1966, found embedded in amber which had been exposed in the cliffs of Cliffwood, New Jersey, by Edmund Frey and his wife. In 1967, zoologists E. O. Wilson, Frank Carpenter and William L. Brown, Jr. published a paper describing and naming Sphecomyrma freyi. They described an ant with a mosaic of features—a mix of characteristics from modern ants and aculeate wasps. It possessed a metapleural gland, a feature unique to ants. Furthermore, it was wingless and had a petiole which was ant-like in form. The mandibles were short and wasp-like with only two teeth, the gaster was constricted, and the middle and hind legs had double tibial spurs. The antennae were, in form, midway between the wasps and ants, having a short first segment but a long flexible funiculus. Three additional species, S. canadensis, S. mesaki and S. nexa, were described in 1985, 2005, and 2024, respectively.

The genus is among the earliest known ants to roam the earth and at the time was considered to be the evolutionary link between ants and wasps. It was suggested that ants diverged from tiphiid wasp ancestors, but later studies show that they originate from a different clade. It shows resemblance to extant primitive ants such as Nothomyrmecia and members of the tribe Aneuretini. Some scientists, however, doubted the nature of these ants and believed they were wasps due to the possible absence of the metapleural gland in Sphecomyrma and short scapes, which are key diagnostic traits for ants. Additional specimens collected proved Sphecomyrma was an ant as the metapleural gland was identified. Further fossil evidence, along with its slender body and large compound eyes, suggest that they were epigaeic, foraging socially above ground and out in open areas. The sphecomyrmines, including these ants, most likely vanished by the end of the Mesozoic.

== Taxonomy ==
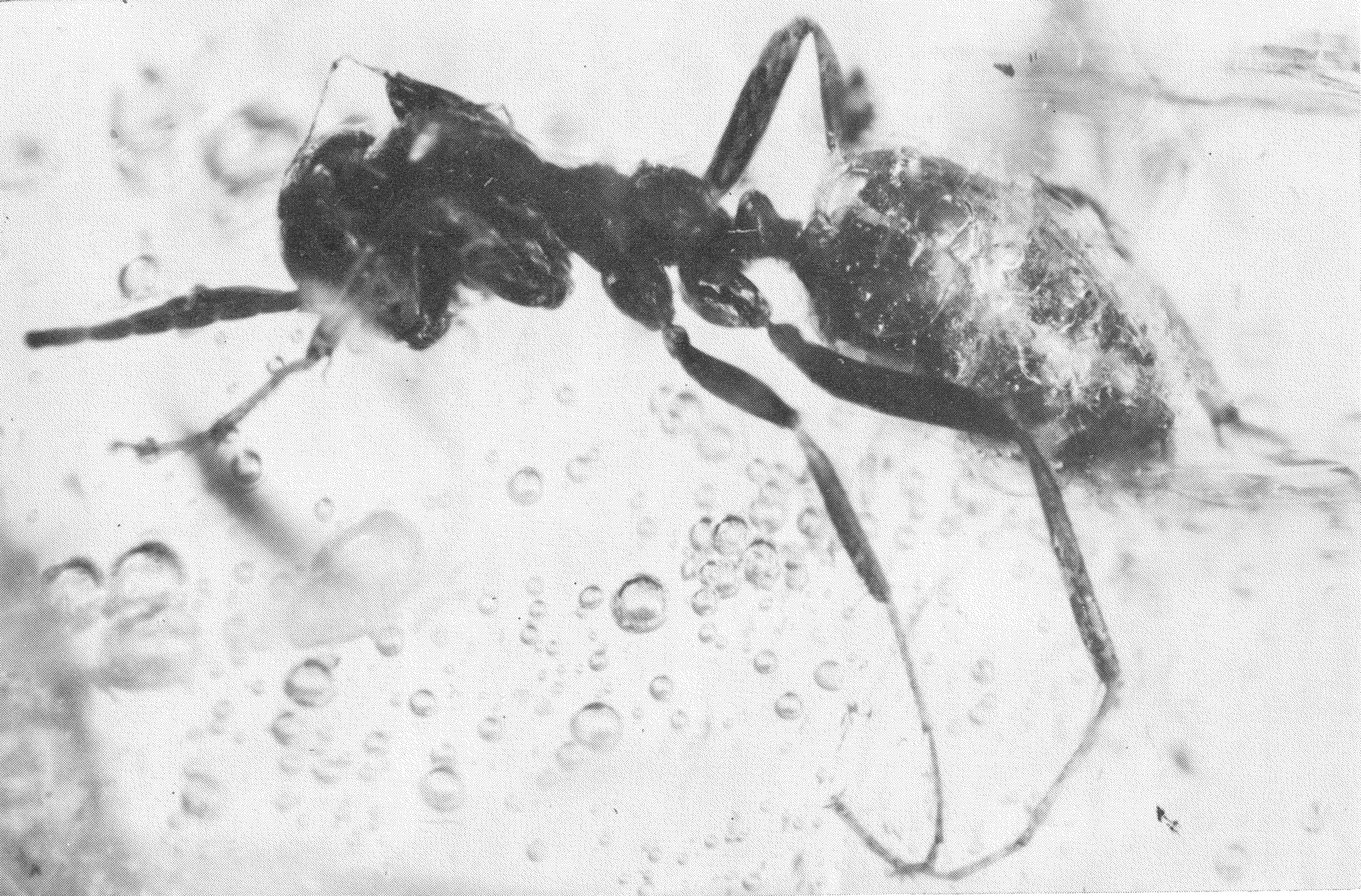
Paratype worker of S. freyi

Before the discovery of the first Sphecomyrma fossils, there were no fossil records of any ants from Cretaceous amber and the oldest social insects at the time extended back to the Eocene epoch; the earliest known ant at the time was described from a forewing found in the Claiborne Formation (Note: In a 1928 article written by American palaeoentomologist Frank M. Carpenter, the forewing fossil he described was supposedly found at the Wilcox Formation, but he misidentified the site. The fossil was actually found in the Claiborne Formation.) in Tennessee. The great diversity of ant fossils found in the Baltic amber and Florissant shales of the Oligocene and in the Sicilian amber of the Miocene have prompted entomologists to search for ants of Cretaceous age that may link ants and non-social wasps together. Such a link may shed light on the early origins of ants, but no fossils of any social insect existed before S. freyi was discovered, thus the early evolution of ants remained a mystery. Only a single hymenopterous Upper Cretaceous fossil has been the subject of possible significance to the evolution of aculeate wasps and ants. A single forewing was discovered in Siberia and described in 1957 as Cretavus sibiricus, with the author noting that the wing venation closely resembles those of bethylid or scoliid wasps, of which these families of wasps have close connections with the origin of ants. However, there were several problems: as the fossil was only a single wing, scientists could not explain or answer whether or not the insect had key diagnostic body traits that would even place it within the subclade Aculeata.

In 1966, the first fossils of S. freyi were collected by Edmund Frey and his wife during a trip collecting mineralogical specimens in the Magothy exposure near Cliffwood Beach in Raritan Bay, New Jersey. They found a large deep red piece of amber embedded in clay containing a number of insects, including some Diptera flies. The approximate age of the fossils dates back to the Cretaceous, 92 million years ago. (Note: Recent sources estimate the fossils to be 80 million years old.) Donald Baird of Princeton University first notified Carpenter about the recent discovery, and David Stager of the Newark Museum arranged to transfer the specimens to be studied and examined. At the time, the existence of ants of Cretaceous age was significant, but the ants were most likely not detected as much of the amber around the site was previously collected. The discovery of the ants confirmed the existence of Cretaceous ants, and the appearance of the workers closely matched the speculations of what Mesozoic ants looked like. (Note: The fossils were the first Cretaceous ants to be described, but not the first discovered. Two pieces of amber, which included a fossilised caddisfly and ant, were labelled resine succinique de 'ile d'Aix Charente inférieure and preserved in the Natural History Museum in Paris. The ant was embedded in Charentese amber and collected no later than 1870, remaining undescribed for at least 150 years until it was rediscovered. The fossil was named "Dolichoformica helferi" by Grimaldi and Engel in 2005, who listed it as a crown-group ant that may be intermediate with Dolichoderinae or Formicinae.) As a result of these finds, E. O. Wilson and colleagues erected the new subfamily Sphecomyrminae and designated the genus Sphecomyrma (meaning "wasp ant") as the type genus in an article they published in 1967 in the journal Science. The published paper included the first description of S. freyi, which was named after Edmund Frey and his wife. A holotype and a paratype of the species were collected and moved to the Museum of Comparative Zoology, but the holotype was accidentally destroyed. However, a neotype specimen numbered AMNH-NJ-112 was collected from the Sunrise Landing site near Brunswick in 1994, and was subsequently donated to the museum. The holotype was destroyed because the amber was accidentally cracked in half, separating the two workers from each other and later stored in a wooden cabinet in an uncovered drawer with other fossil insects for 30 years; the piece eventually deteriorated, appearing more dark and fractured.

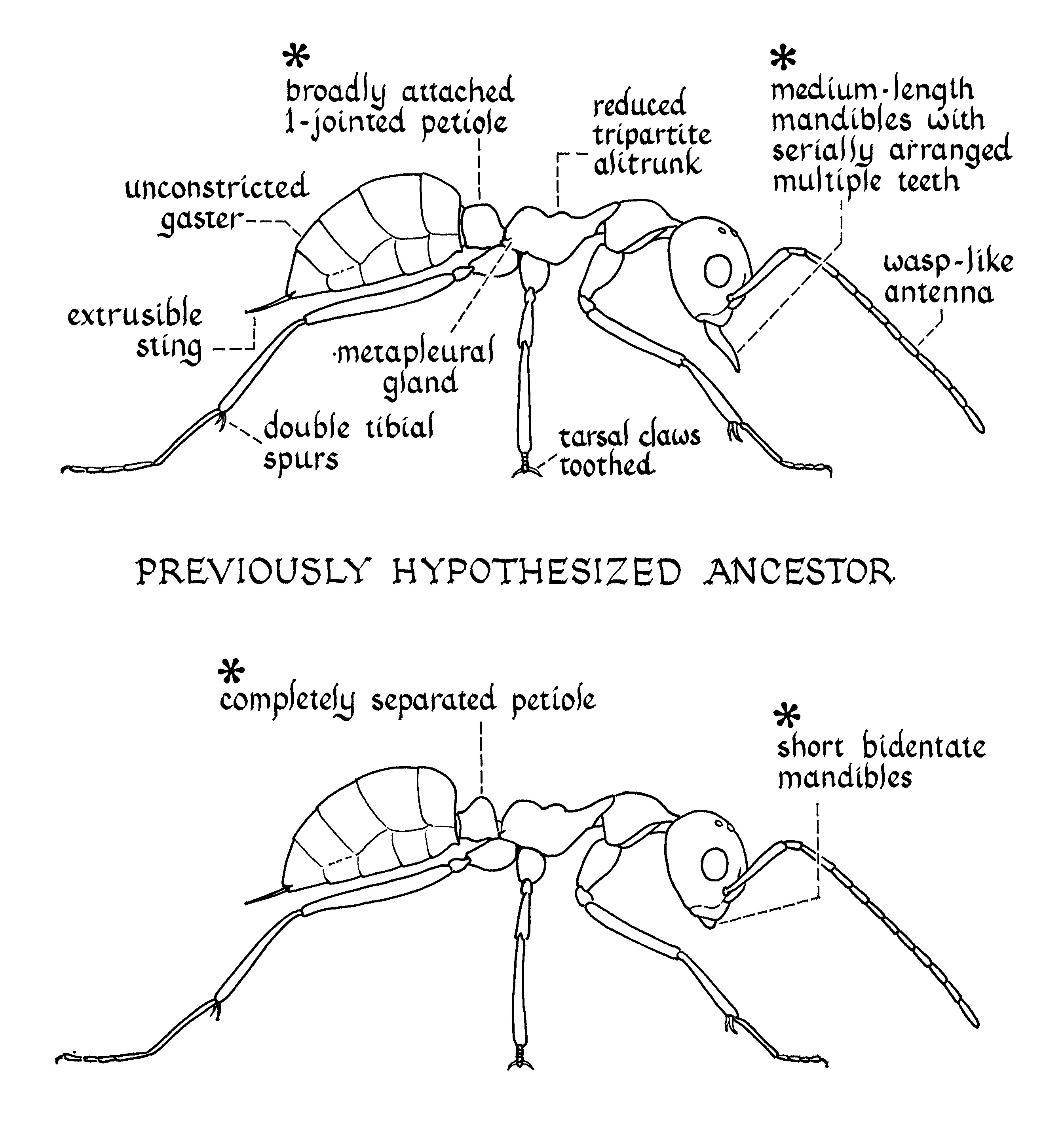
A comparison of the archetypal ant as hypothesised before the discovery of Sphecomyrma. The body details of the hypothesised ancestor (top) are made the same as S. freyi (bottom) for convenience.

Although the hypothesised description of what Mesozoic ants looked like was somewhat accurate when compared to actual specimens, some characteristics were inaccurate. They believed that ant-like mandibles first appeared before the development of an ant-like petiole, but such case was proven false when it was opposite on S. freyi specimens (ant-like petiole first appeared before the development of ant-like mandibles). Based on drawings, it was suggested that Mesozoic ants had long mandibles with multiple teeth, toothed tarsal claws and a broadly jointed petiole. Examination of collected specimens, however, shows that these ants had very short mandibles, toothless tarsal claws and a separated petiole.

S. freyi remained as the sole member of Sphecomyrma until a fossil closely resembling the species was collected in Canadian amber deposits in 1985. Wilson provided the first description of the fossil, naming it S. canadensis. He notes that the close resemblance of the fossils to S. freyi in key characteristics strongly support its inclusion in Sphecomyrminae. He further notes that the specimens are the first ants recorded in Canadian amber, but a vast diversity of insects have been found in the amber prior to the discovery, stretching as far back as the 19th century. The discovery of the specimens from Canada indicates that the subfamily was widespread through much of the northern hemisphere during the late Cretaceous. In 2005, new fossils of an undescribed Sphecomyrma ant and S. freyi were collected in the White Oaks outcrop in Sayreville, New Jersey. The specimens were later donated to the American Museum of Natural History and studied by palaeoentomologists Michael Engel and David Grimaldi, who both provided the first description of the undescribed ant in an American Museum Novitates journal article, naming it Sphecomyrma mesaki. The age of these fossils are estimated at 79 to 92 million years.

In 1987, the Russian palaeoentomologist Gennady M. Dlussky elevated the subfamily to family level, renaming it Sphecomyrmidae to accommodate Sphecomyrma and other fossil insects he studied throughout the Soviet Union. This placement was short-lived as Wilson, with new morphological evidence, reduced the family back to subfamily level and all studied Cretaceous ants were put into Sphecomyrma or Cretomyrma. However, Dlussky and the Russian palaeoentomologist Elena B. Fedoseeva retained their classification and Sphecomyrma remained under Sphecomyrmidae. Their reasons were that the first segments of the antenna were too short to be geniculate (elbowed), and the structure of the mandibles. As geniculate antennae allow brood and food manipulation, or even sociality, it is impossible to classify Sphecomyrma and relatives as ants. Despite the authors' notes, they did not cite any study as to how ants manipulate items and such with their antennae, but he may have implied that the apices, a feature found on the antenna, may have been too far away from the mandibles. The close distance of the apices from the mandibles would allow manipulation of food or antennation with other nestmates. Another issue was whether or not a metapleural gland was present, a unique feature only found in ants. Despite this and previous claims made by Dlussky saying that sphecomyrmines including Sphecomyrma were most likely solitary or semi-communal, the confirmed existence of the metapleural gland through newly collected fossils confirms that Sphecomyrma and relatives were definitely social. The evidence against Dlussky eventually reinstated Sphecomyrma and the subfamily as members of Formicidae in 1997, although some sources published before 1997 did not formally recognise Sphecomyrminae at family level. Additional doubts surrounding the nature of Sphecomyrma and relatives emerged when a 1999 paper concluded that the fossil ants found in Cretaceous amber in New Jersey were closer to wasps than they were to ants. This was quickly dismissed due to overwhelming evidence supporting their placement within the Formicidae, and the fact the authors cited unpublished cladograms and disregarded the key diagnostic traits (synapomorphies) found in the ants.

=== Evolution ===
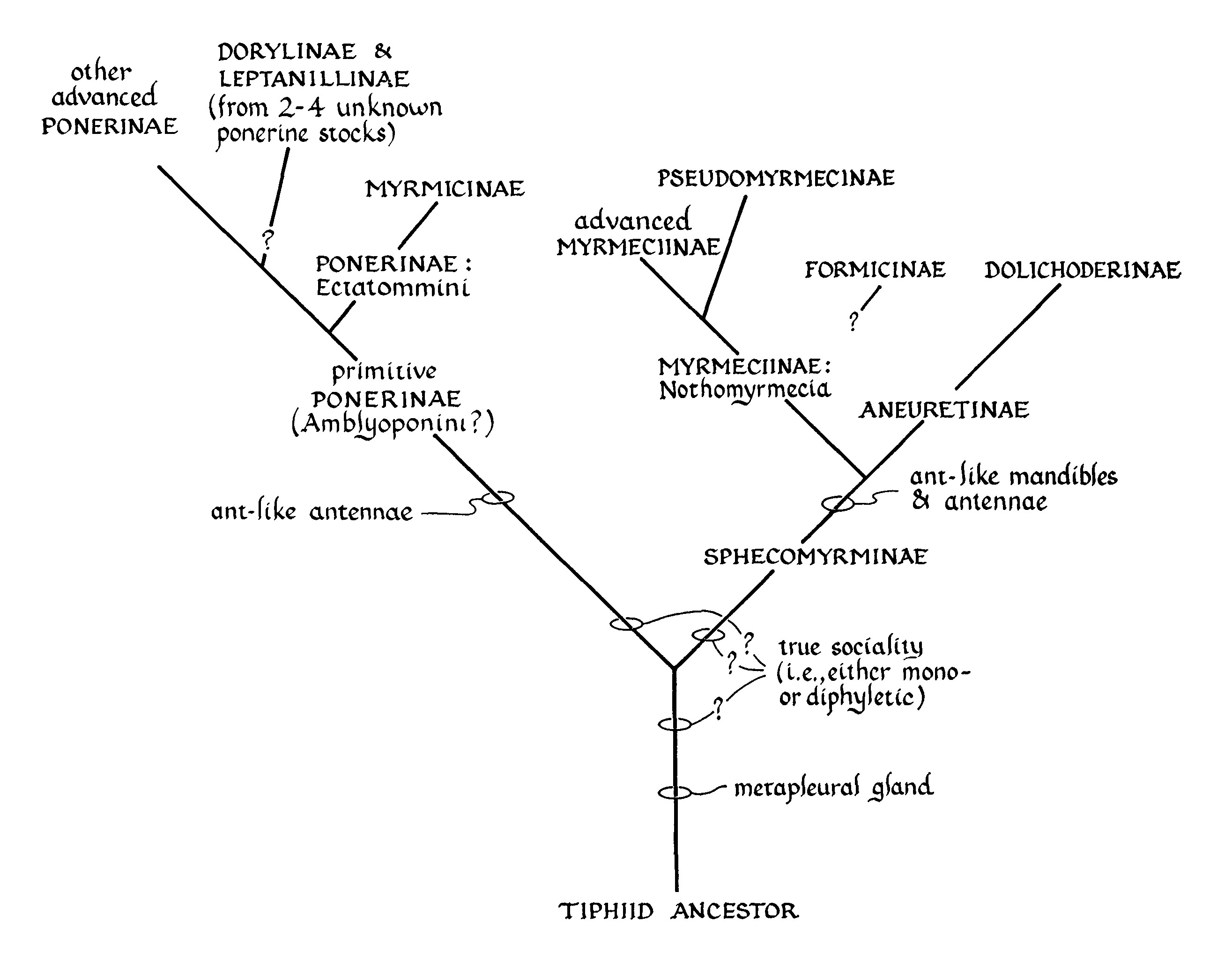
Original hypothetical cladogram showing the placement of Sphecomyrma, with the tiphiid wasps as the potential ancestor

Ants of this genus are considered to be the most primitive within the family Formicidae. The body presents a wasp-like structure but with several ant-like characteristics. These ant-like characteristics, however, are primitive compared to more modern ants, and thus it is intermediate with other primitive ants and aculeate wasps. The presence of the metapleural gland, the nodiform (a structure resembling a node, which is a segment found between the mesosoma and gaster, the bulbous posterior portion of the metasoma), the structure of the petiole and its general physical appearance of an ant concludes Sphecomyrma species are ants rather than wasps; the absence of the metapleural gland would mean that it is most likely a wasp instead of an ant. It is not exactly known which group of wasps are the ancestors of Sphecomyrma, but members of the family Thynnidae, particularly those in the genus Methocha, are strikingly similar to Sphecomyrma. Wilson placed the genus closest to the Tiphiidae among extant wasps, but a later study published in 1975 derived the ants from a later clade and not to the Tiphiidae. More recently, ants (including Sphecomyrma) are considered to have evolved from a lineage within the aculeate wasps, and a 2013 study suggests that they are a sister group of the Apoidea, and the sister group to this lineage is likely the Scoliidae.

Sphecomyrma may hold a close relationship with extant primitive ants. The Australian dinosaur ant (Nothomyrmecia macrops) is recognised as the most primitive living ant today, and both ants closely resemble each other. The Eocene genera of Aneuretini also resemble Sphecomyrma ants, which are believed to be the ancestors of Dolichoderinae. The subfamily Myrmeciinae was thought to be the ancestor of Aneuretini because the elongated mandibles (a well-known feature in Myrmeciinae ants), were considered primitive and short mandibles were derived. This theory was proven false after Sphecomyrma specimens had small mandibles. Currently, phylogenetic analyses recognise Sphecomyrma as a sister group to modern living ants, meaning that is a stem-group formicid. This means that it is more closely related to the ants in contrast to any other organism, but the crown-group formicids (as in the most recent common ancestor of modern ants and their descendants) are more closely related to each other and distantly related to Sphecomyrma. By the end of the Mesozoic, the sphecomyrmines including these ants vanished.

== Description ==
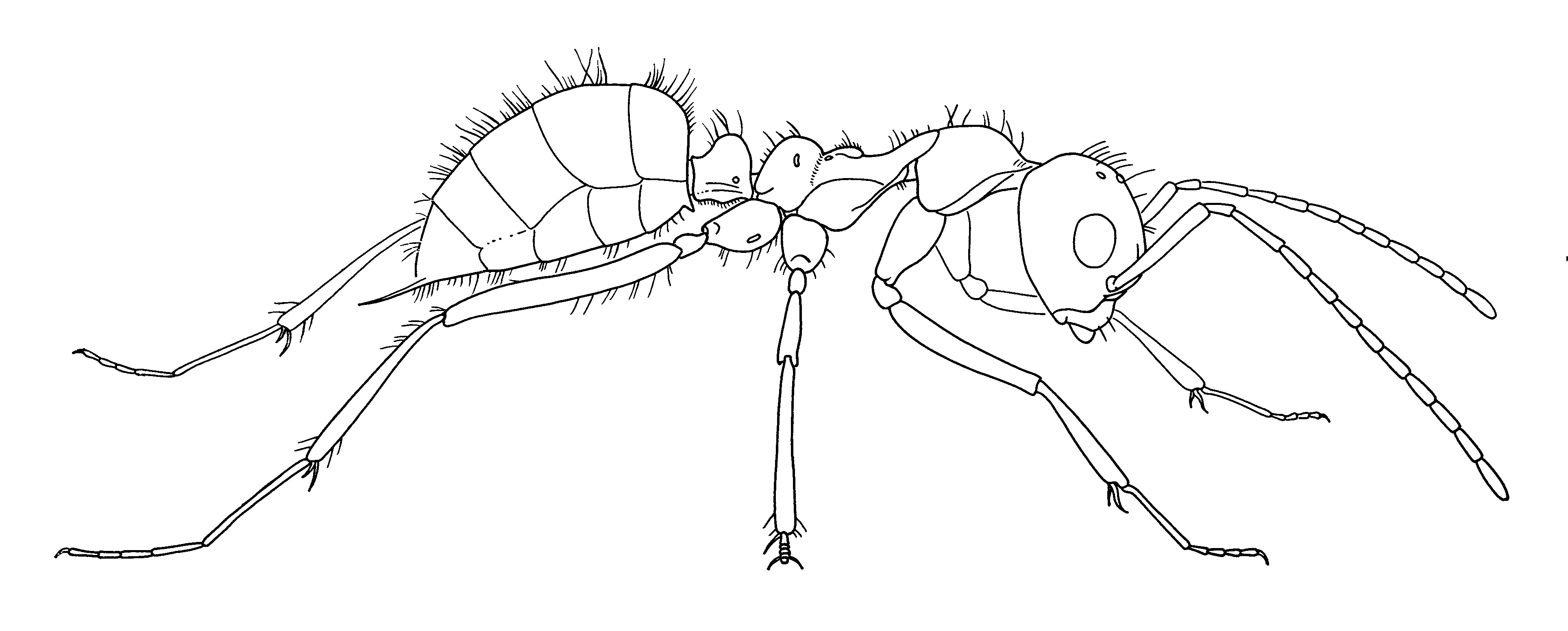
Drawing of an S. freyi worker

Sphecomyrma ants can be distinguished from other ants by their extremely primitive body structure, small, narrow wasp-like mandibles, short scapes (the basal segment of the antenna) and the exceptionally long funiculus, which is four times longer than the scape. The suture (a pattern of shallow grooves on the head) is well developed and the trochantellus (the proximal end of the femur) is absent. The node (a segment between the mesosoma, the middle part of the body, and gaster) of the petiole is noticeably dome-shaped and is separated from the propodeum, the first abdominal segment, and parts of the metasoma, the posterior part of the body, by several constrictions. The cuticle (outer exoskeleton of the body) is not sculptured and is covered with either scattered or spare setae, which are different types of bristle or hair-like structures. The body structure shows that Sphecomyrma ants were medium-sized formicids. Workers are known to have stingers.

=== S. canadensis ===
S. canadensis was described from a holotype and paratype specimen, one of which is from Canadian amber and the other, the paratype, is poorly preserved and was collected from Medicine Hat amber. The holotype and paratype specimens, numbered CAS 330 and CAS 205 respectively, are currently preserved in the Biosystematics Research Institute in Ottawa, Canada. Its body is similar to S. freyi, but it has a narrower head than S. canadensis (the head of S. freyi is 1.00 millimetre (0.039 in) wide). The mesosoma is more robust and the third funicular segment is extremely short and as long as the second segment, while it is twice as long in S. freyi. The width and length of the head are the same at 0.66 millimetres (0.026 in) and the scapes measure 0.50 millimetres (0.020 in) The length of the mesosoma varies in the holotype and paratype, ranging from 1.32 to 1.57 millimetres (0.052 to 0.062 in).

=== S. freyi ===
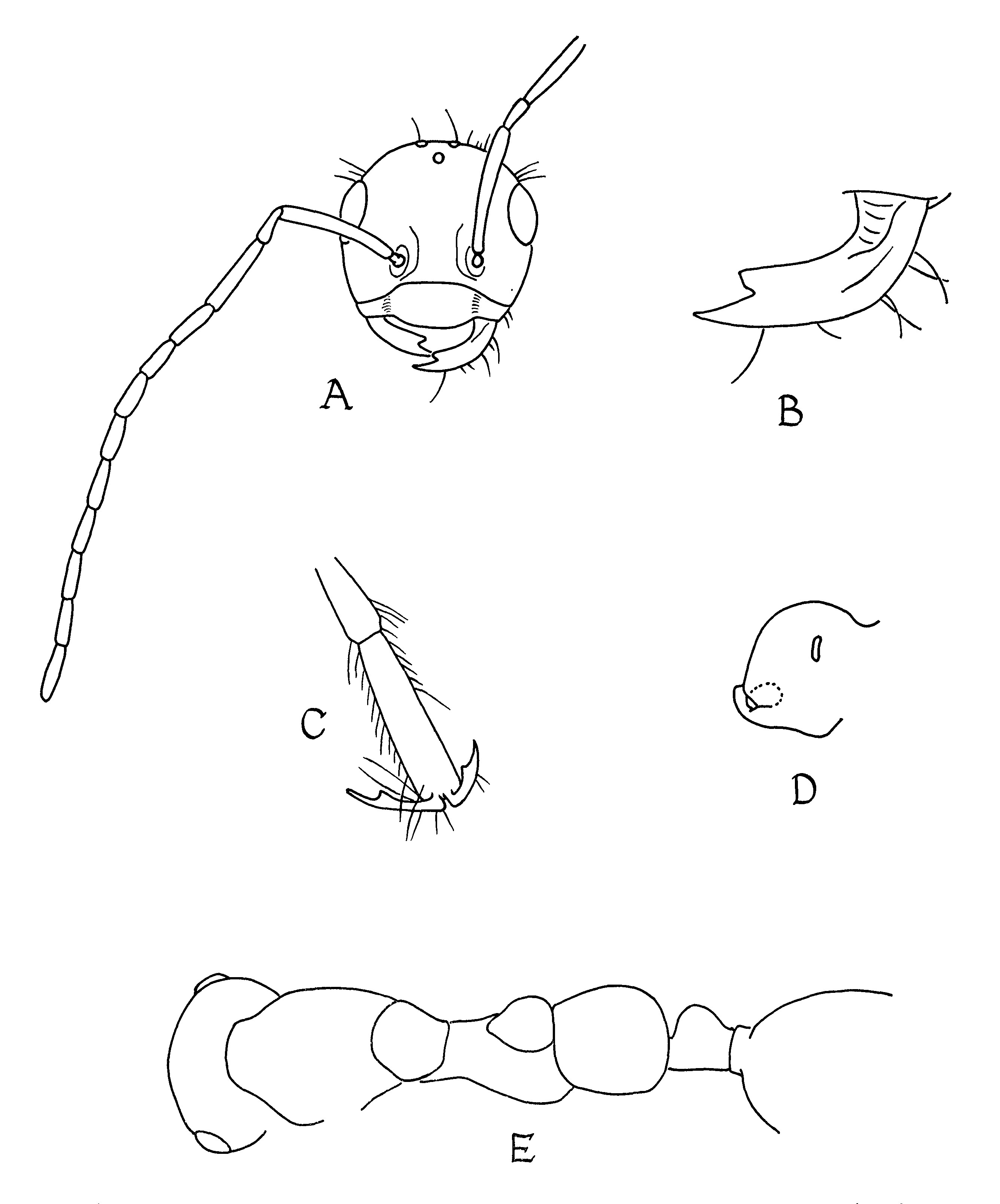
Drawings of various body parts of S. freyi

S. freyi ants are small, measuring 4 millimetres (0.16 in). The mandibles are wasp-like, its 12-segmented antennae are far apart from each other and the second funicular segment is longer than all the other segments. This is unusual for ants, but such case occurs in Nothomyrmecia macrops. The scapes are very short at 0.57 millimetres (0.022 in). The compound eyes are very long and convex, situated on the middle side of the head. The clypeus (one of the sclerites that make up the "face" of an arthropod or insect) is broad and convex and the ocelli (photoreceptors) are well developed. The mesosoma is slender and closely resembles those of Methocha malayana, measuring 1.48 millimetres (0.058 in). The mesonotum is also long and slender with a distinct convexed scutum and scutellum, but these two features are separated from each other by an axillary region. Spiracles are present on the metathorax, but they are situated just below the scutellum. The petiole has a raised node and separated from the propodeum and the gaster. The gaster measures 1.51 millimetres (0.059 in), and an acute protruding stinger, measuring 0.33 millimetres (0.013 in) is present. The legs are long and slender with two tibial spurs present at each tibia, and the tarsal claws have a median tooth. The two worker specimens have little morphological differences, but they range in size. The head and segments of the antenna tend to be smaller in the holotype specimen while in the paratype they are slightly larger. The pubescence is short but scattered throughout the body, measuring 0.001 millimetres (3.9×10^{−5} in). The colour of the specimens appears to be light-brown. The metapleural gland exhibits a notably wide and oval-shaped orifice, (openings into the body). The separation between the orifice and the posterior portion of the propodeum is twice the diameter than the orifice itself. The cuticle situated in the anterior portion (referring to what is in front) of the orifice is thinner in contrast to the cuticle surrounding the mesosoma, where it is notably transparent. An oddly shaped chamber can be seen beneath the cuticle, but this is most likely the atrium (chamber with a hardened, thickened wall). The gland itself is covered in a whitish mass and is located in the anterodorsal region (meaning in front and toward the back) of the subcuticular chamber. The gland is said to be shrunken from its original size.

=== S. mesaki ===
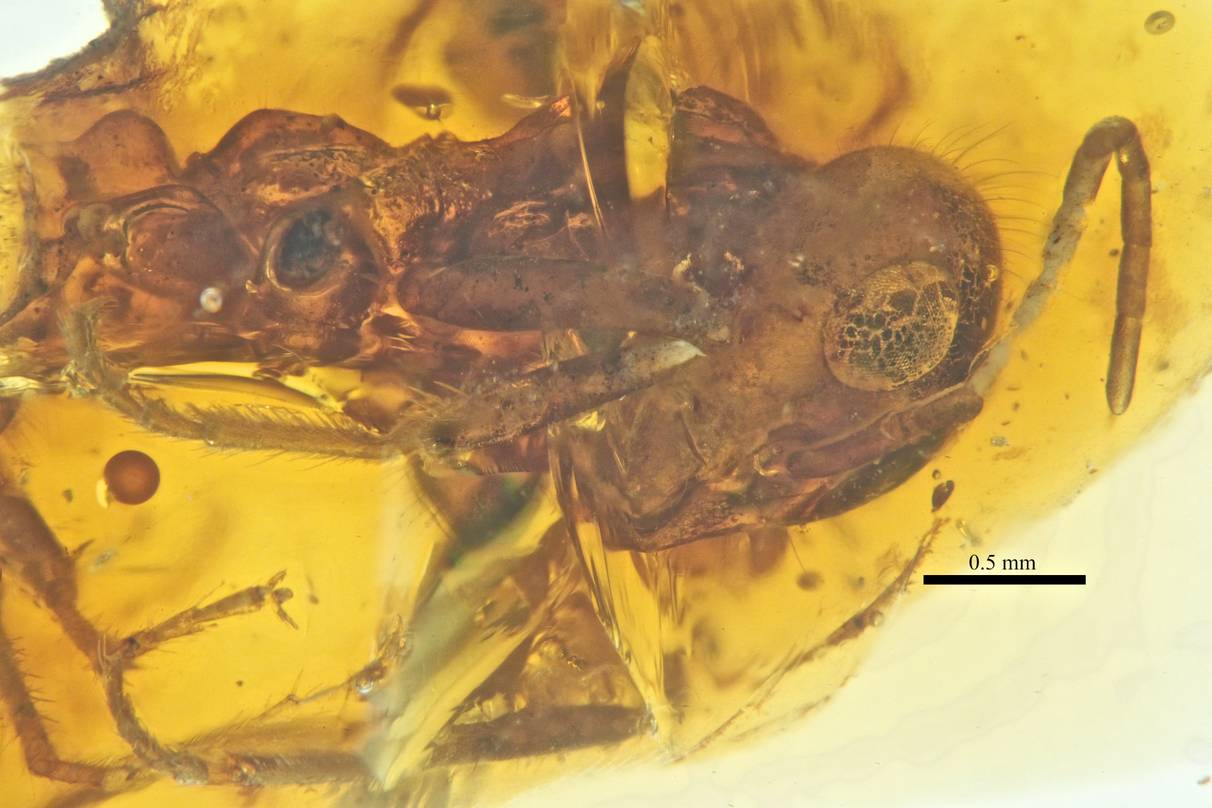
Closeup view of S. mesaki

S. mesaki was found in a small piece of amber barely larger than the ant itself. The incomplete specimen numbered AMNH NJ-1023 is currently preserved at the American Museum of Natural History in New York City. The appendages breach the surface of the amber while the petiole and gaster are completely absent. Engel and Grimaldi coined the specific epithet after Bob Mesak, the original collector who donated the specimen to the museum. The species is discernible from the other species by a portion of the clypeus having an elongated ventral lobe. The broad but shallow scrobes of the antennae, the size of the head and oval-shaped eyes can further distinguish S. mesaki from other Sphecomyrma ants. The only body parts of the ant that are preserved are the legs, mesosoma and head. The head is notably large, but it is shorter than its mesosoma. The head is 2.2 mm (0.087 in) long and 1.95 millimetres (0.077 in) wide, with the eyes alone measuring 0.66 millimetres (0.026 in). The vertex is covered in sparse pilosity with 0.2 millimetres (0.0079 in) setae. Ocelli are present on top of the ants' head, precisely located just above the dorsal tangent. The base of the antennae emerges from the scrobes, which are equally as long as the scape. The eyes are well developed and located above the bottom of the antennae. The clypeus is setose, meaning that it bears bristles or setae, except on the middle part. The mandibles are small and only contain two teeth. The antennae are moderately long, the scapes are very short but the pedicel is even shorter. The mesosoma measures 2.66 millimetres (0.105 in) and is setose. Several setae are seen around the metanotum (the dorsal sclerite) and propodeum. The coxae, the proximal segment and functional base of the leg, are setose (bearing bristle or setae), inflated and large. The metapleural gland opening is small and noticeable, located away from the propodeum and above the metacoxa (the hind of the coxa). The legs are moderately long. The forelegs first tarsomere (subsegments of the tarsus) is longer than the combined length of other tarsomeres more distant than the first subsegment. The number of stiff setae varies on each tarsomere: for example, the first tarsomere has seven pairs while the fourth tarsomere has only two pairs. The pretarsal claw has a single subapical tooth and the metasoma is absent.

=== Unplaced specimens ===
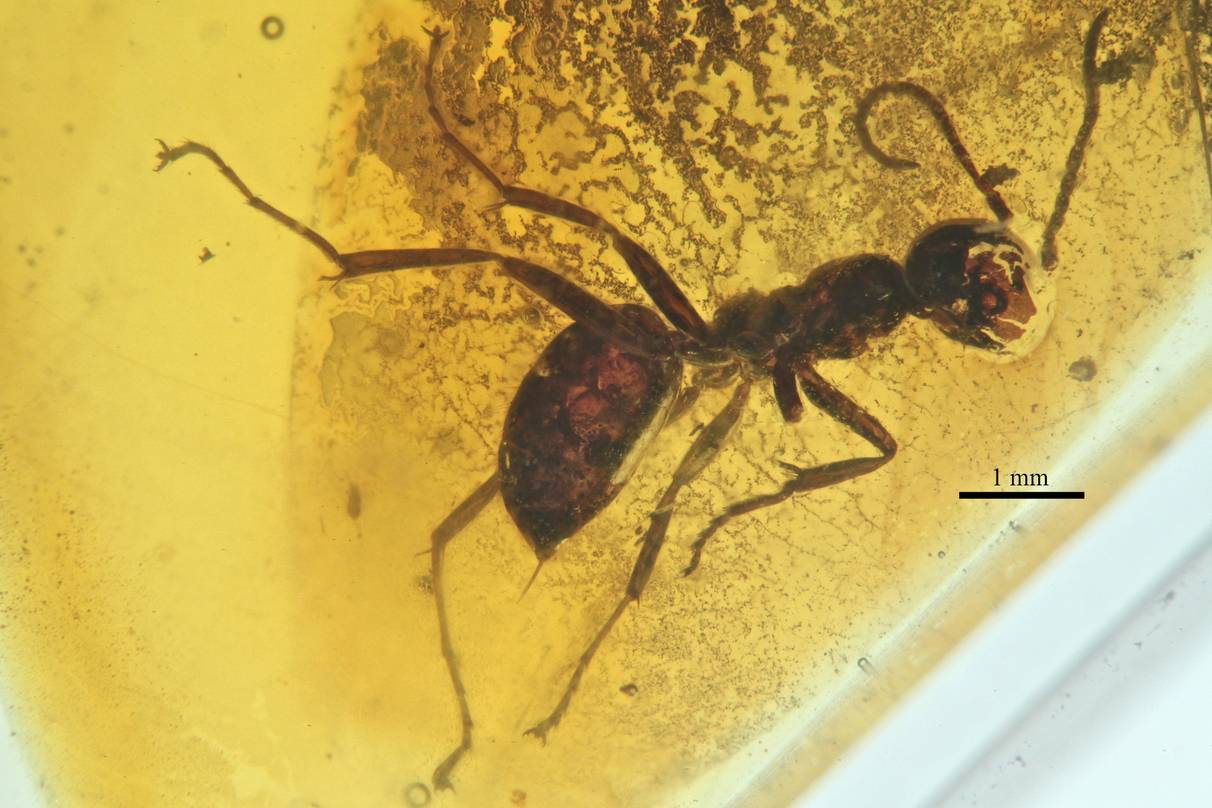
S. freyi worker

An additional specimen was described as a possible Sphecomyrma male, but it was never assigned to a specific species. The specimen numbered AMNH NJ-242 was collected from the White Oaks outcrop in 1995 by Keith Luzzi and is currently preserved in the American Museum of Natural History. The entire body of the male specimen is completely preserved. As most ant genera are based on the morphology of workers, assigning males to a species or a genus is rarely done unless they are taken from a colony. However, its size, petiole structure, the absence of the trochantellus and basal antennal structure are similar to that of a Sphecomyrma worker. It is a small ant, measuring 3.13 millimetres (0.123 in) with three ocelli present on the vertex. Stiff hairs can be found on its frons and vertex. It has large eyes and the face has two pairs of long setae along with smaller setae. The scape is short and is around the same length as the flagellomere (one of the three main segments of the antenna); the pedicel is only slightly longer than the flagellomere by 0.3 times, and the total length of the antenna is 2.6 millimetres (0.10 in). Most of its mouthparts are covered in bubbles from the amber, but two palpals (a pair of appendages found near the mouth) are seen protruding. The mesosoma is 1.25 millimetres (0.049 in) in length and the petiole is 0.35 millimetres (0.014 in), which has pairs of long setae on the apex of the nodus. Both tibias have a pair of setose and the apical spurs on the hind tibia is pectinate. The forewings measure 2.25 millimetres (0.089 in) and the hindwings are 0.7 times the length of the forewings. The shape of the wings is consistent with other formicids. The hindwings have seven hamuli but none is found around the anterior portions. The gaster is 1.22 millimetres (0.048 in) long and the first and second segments are equally as long as each other (these two segments alone cover two-thirds of the gaster). The terminalia (the last segments of the abdomen) is difficult to examine due to a layer of froth covering the area, but there are two pairs of setose lobes.

== Ecology ==
As some scientists such as Dlussky believed Sphecomyrma was not an ant, they thought it was solitary and semi-communal. Further statements include that the morphology of sphecomyrmines would prevent workers from transporting larvae or engaging in trophallaxis (transfer of food between two nestmates) with them. However, wasps with antennal proportions similar to sphecomyrmines are able to feed their own larvae. The presence of the metapleural gland also shows that Sphecomyrma was a eusocial (the highest level of organisation of animal sociality) insect and lived in colonies, as this gland possibly acts as a disinfectant in order to nest in soil and leaf litter without infecting the colony's nestmates and brood. The large eyes, long appendages and thin exoskeleton suggests that workers were epigaeic, where they foraged above ground and out in the open. Fossil evidence further suggests that they foraged socially with other worker ants.
