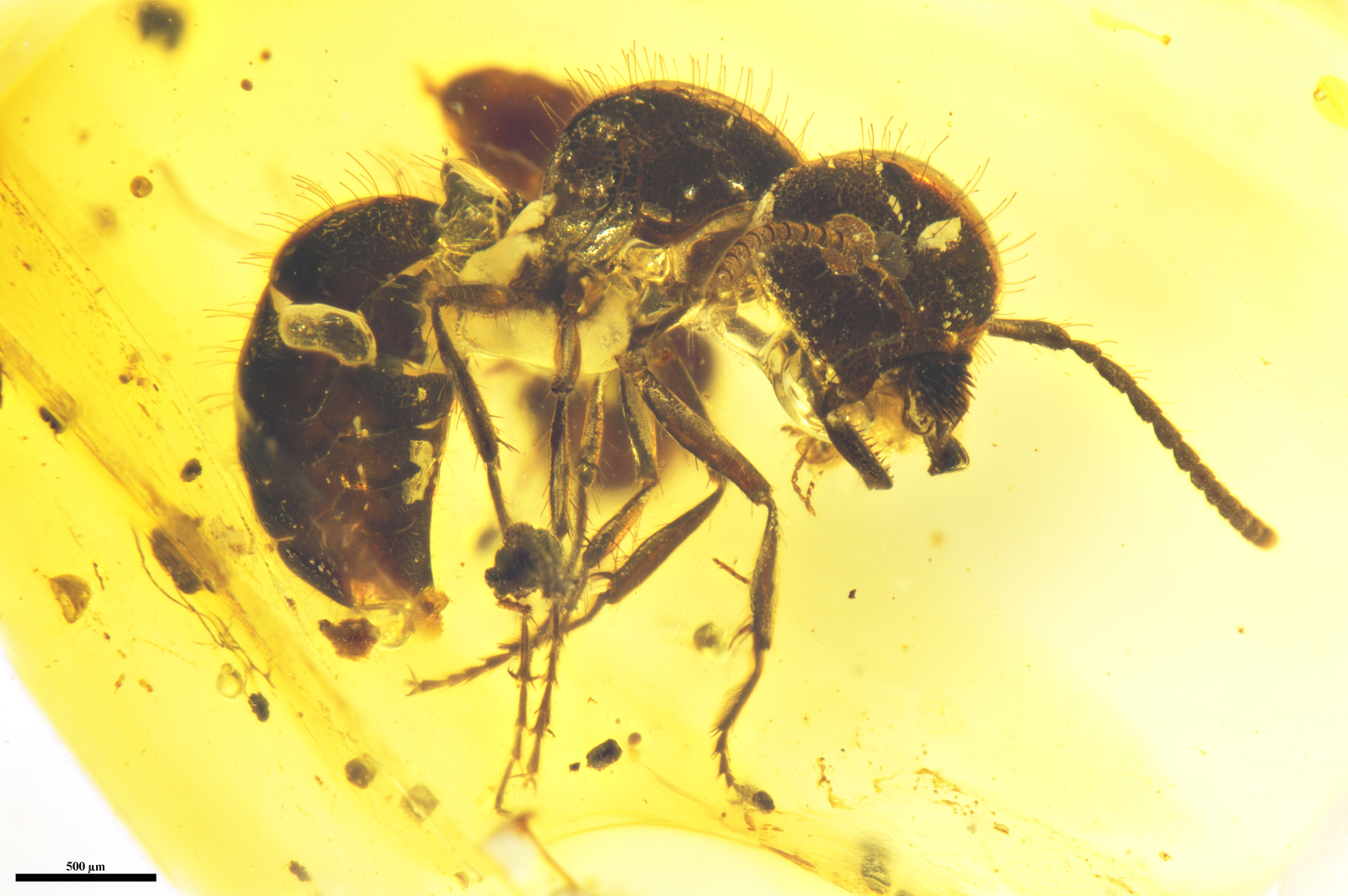
- Zigrasimecia hoelldobleri worker

Scientific classification
- Kingdom: Animalia
- Phylum: Arthropoda
- Clade: Pancrustacea
- Class: Insecta
- Order: Hymenoptera
- Family: Formicidae
- Subfamily: †Zigrasimeciinae
- Genus: †Zigrasimecia; Barden & Grimaldi, 2013

Type species
- Zigrasimecia tonsora

Diversity
- 12 species

= Zigrasimecia =

Zigrasimecia Temporal range: Late Albian - early Cenomanian 100 Ma

Extinct genus of ants

Zigrasimecia, also known as iron-maiden ants, is an extinct genus of ants which existed in the Cretaceous period approximately 98 million years ago. The first specimens were collected from Burmese amber in Kachin State, 100 kilometres (62 mi) west of Myitkyina town in Myanmar. In 2013, palaeoentomologists Phillip Barden and David Grimaldi published a paper describing and naming Zigrasimecia tonsora. They described a dealate female with unusual features, notably the highly specialized mandibles. Other features include large ocelli, short scapes, 12 antennomeres, small eyes, and a clypeal margin that has a row of peg-like denticles. The genus Zigrasimecia was originally incertae sedis (uncertain placement) within Formicidae until a second species, Zigrasimecia ferox, was described in 2014, leading to its placement in the subfamily Sphecomyrminae. Later, it was considered to belong to the distinct subfamily Zigrasimeciinae. Zigrasimecia has 12 described species, with the newest species Zigrasimecia zui discovered in 2024.

Due to the highly specialized mandibles, scientists believe that the ants exhibited habits no longer seen in extant ants. The highly movable head suggests that mobility was an important factor for them (probably for feeding behavior), and the rugose projections may have played a major role in nest excavation because the mandibles would have prevented such activity. Zigrasimecia most likely interacted with the extinct ant genus Gerontoformica through conflict and probably shared some of their ecological niches. The mandibles of these ants were probably used for mechanical interactions with food, and they may also have served as traps for potential arthropod prey such as mites and small flies. Zigrasimecia was possibly a generalist predator.

== Taxonomic history ==
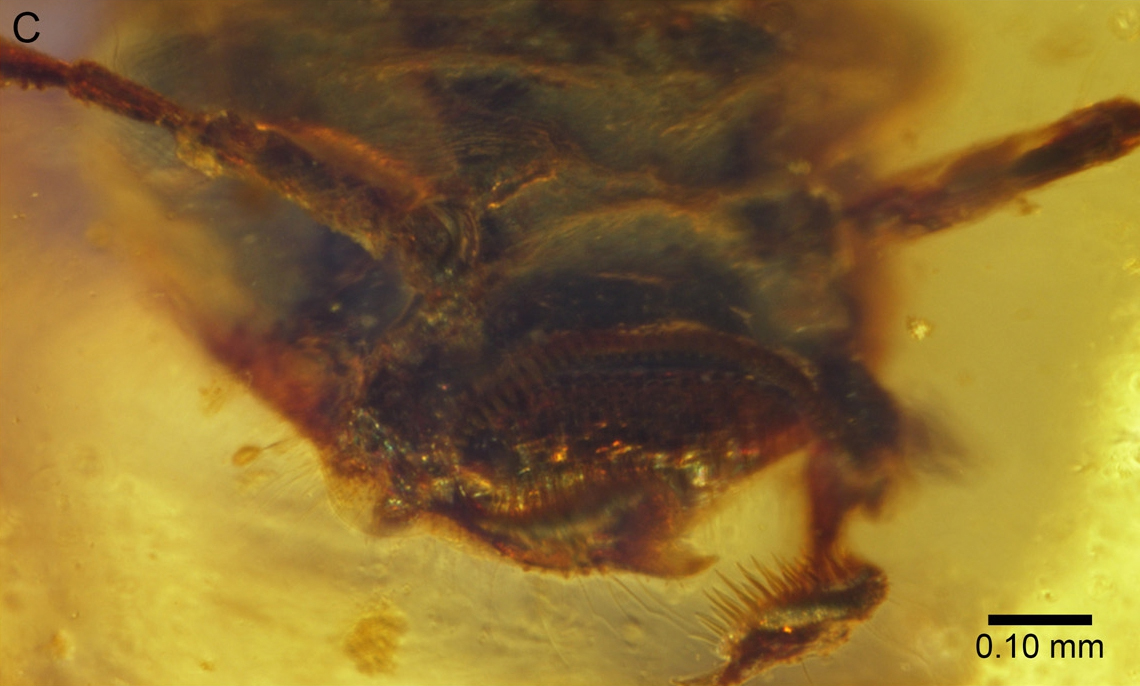
Z. tonsora photomicrograph, showing the clypeal and mandibular structures.

Zigrasimecia tonsora is only known from a single specimen, the holotype, specimen number JZC Bu-159. At the time of description, the specimen was residing in the private collection of James Zigras and only available for study through the American Museum of Natural History. The solitary adult fossil is composed of a mostly-complete dealate adult female which has been preserved as an inclusion in transparent chunks of deep yellow and relatively clear Burmese amber. The amber specimen was recovered from deposits in Kachin State, 100 kilometres (62 mi) west of Myitkyina town in Myanmar. Burmese amber has been radiometrically dated using U-Pb isotopes, yielding an age of approximately 99 million years old, close to the Albian – Cenomanian boundary. The fossil was first studied by palaeoentomologists Phillip Barden and David Grimaldi, both of the AMNH. Barden and Grimaldi's 2013 type description of the new genus and species was published in the online journal Zootaxa. The genus name Zigrasimecia is a patronym which was coined as a combination of James Zigras' last name and -mecia which is a commonly used suffix in ant generic names. They are known as iron-maiden ants in reference to their densely spiked mouthparts, reminiscent of an iron maiden torture device, that were likely used to trap prey.

In Barden and Grimaldi's article, the authors could not sufficiently identify the ant with enough confidence to place it in a subfamily. Instead, it was incertae sedis within the Formicidae. Although a recent published morphological study provided useful information on the mouthparts of basal ants, placing Cretaceous taxa is still difficult. However, synapomorphies (key diagnostic traits) could have been used to attempt to place Zigrasimecia. Key synapomorphies for Sphecomyrmine ants include scape (the base segment of the antenna) length; petiole (narrow waist between the thorax and abdomen); and the metapleural gland (secretory glands), as indicated by Barry Bolton's diagnosis. The morphology of Z. tonsora shows a variety of autapomorphies (derived traits) not seen in any other ant species, particularly the structure of the mandibles and mesosomal sculpturing. Another issue in placing Z. tonsora is that the status of Sphecomyrminae had rarely ever been evaluated (perhaps once) via phylogenetic methodology. Due to this, it was possible that the subfamily was not monophyletic.

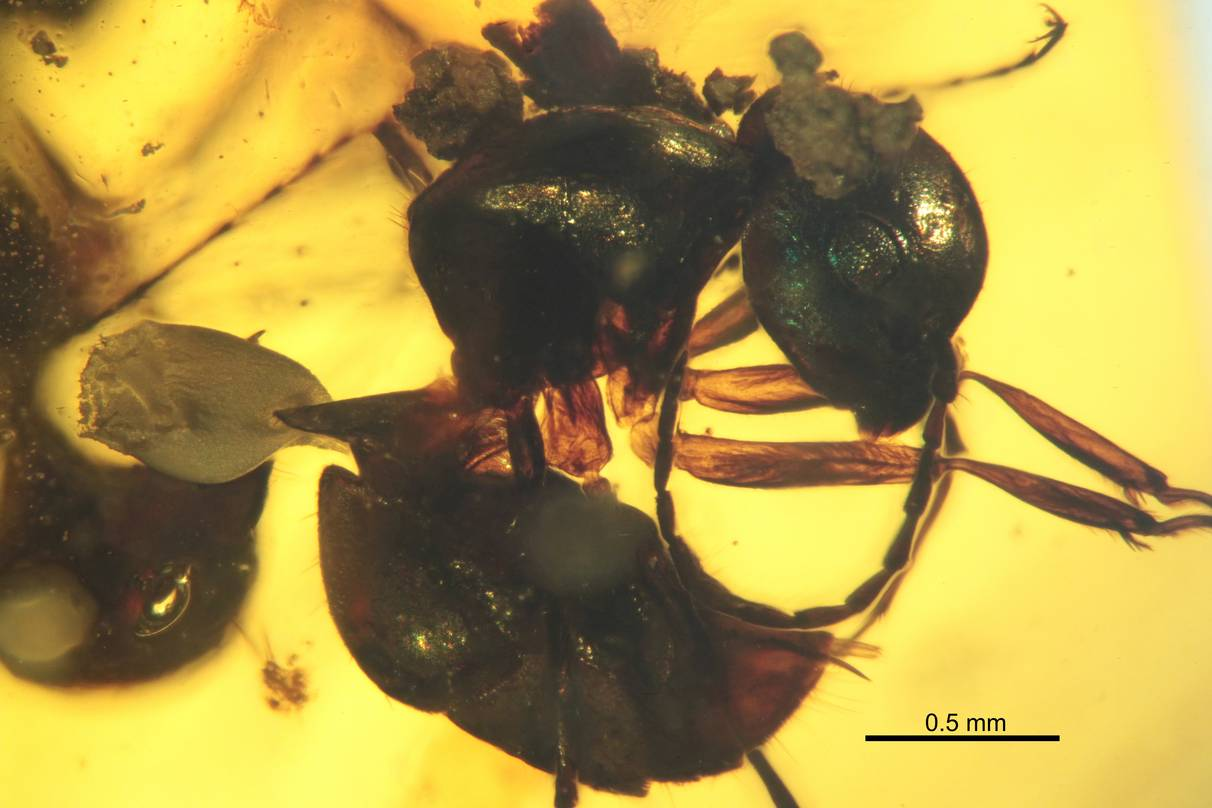
Z. ferox paratype, specimen JWJ-Bu18b

In 2014, palaeoentomologist Vincent Perrichot of the Université de Rennes studied a number of specimens recovered in amber from the Late Cretaceous, dating back to 98 million years. The specimens were collected from Hukawng Valley in Kachin State. Upon examination, it was revealed that the specimens are distinct from Z. tonsora. As a result, Perrichot provided the first description of this ant in a 2014 article published by Myrmecological News. He named it Z. ferox; its specific epithet means "fierce" in Latin, referencing the appearance of the head. Z. ferox is known from a holotype specimen, numbered JWJ-Bu18a, and many paratypes. Three of these paratypes are completely preserved workers, and two partial workers are missing their legs and gastral apices, while one worker is missing its mesosoma (the middle part of an insect's body). In the same article, Perrichot moved Zigrasimecia to Sphecomyrminae, stating that there is little doubt that the species are members of Sphecomyrminae. He notes that the workers of Z. ferox possess most synapomorphies provided by Bolton. For example, the antennae are geniculate and the scapes are rather short; the funiculus (segments between the antennal base and club) is filiform; there are no known propodeal lobes (a carina that delimits the propodeal scrobe laterally); two spurs are present on the mesotibia and metatibia (the middle and hind part of the tibia); and a preapical tooth is found on the claws and a sting is present. Its placement within the tribe Sphecomyrmini is supported by the female mandibles bearing two teeth and the elongated third antennal segment.

In 2020 and 2021 respectively, the new species Z. hoelldobleri and Z. goldingot were described, also from Burmese amber. In 2024 Z. zui was characterised also from burmese amber.

=== Classification ===
Based on the apomorphic characters, Zigrasimecia species may share a close relationship with other extinct ants such as Gerontoformica, particularly those that were in the former genus Sphecomyrmodes. The most prominent character is the peg-like setae (bristle-like hairs) found around the oral cavity (the mouth). Certain species such as G. cretacica, G. orientalis and G. occidentalis possess one row of stout setae that can be found on the anterior portion of the clypeus (one of the sclerites that make up the "face" of an arthropod or insect), while Z. tonsora shows two additional rows of these setae. However, such structures have not been identified in any other Cretaceous ant. The labral setae on G. cretacica and Z. tonsora are similar, although G. cretacia has teeth-like setae, and Z. tonsora has tapered and hair-like setae. The ocelli (or "simple eye" because ocelli contain a single lens) in G. orientalis and Z. tonsora are also similar in appearance; G. cretacica does not possess ocelli, and it is not known whether G. orientalis possess them because the dorsal head region is obscured. Despite the similarities, it is unlikely that they are actually certain castes of the same species, especially because Z. tonsora is a dealated (wingless) female. The following cladogram of stem group ants in relation to wasps and crown group ants (a group of living members that contains their descendants of the last common ancestor) was produced by Barden and Grimaldi in 2016. Although Z. tonsora is not present in the cladogram, the placement of Z. ferox gives insight to the placement of the genus: In 2017 Zigrasimecia was placed into the separate tribe Zigrasimeciini, which was later upgraded to the distinct family Zigrasimeciinae in 2020, alongside the genera Boltonimecia and Protozigrasimecia also known from Cretaceous amber, due to their uncertain relationship to other Cretaceous stem-group ants.

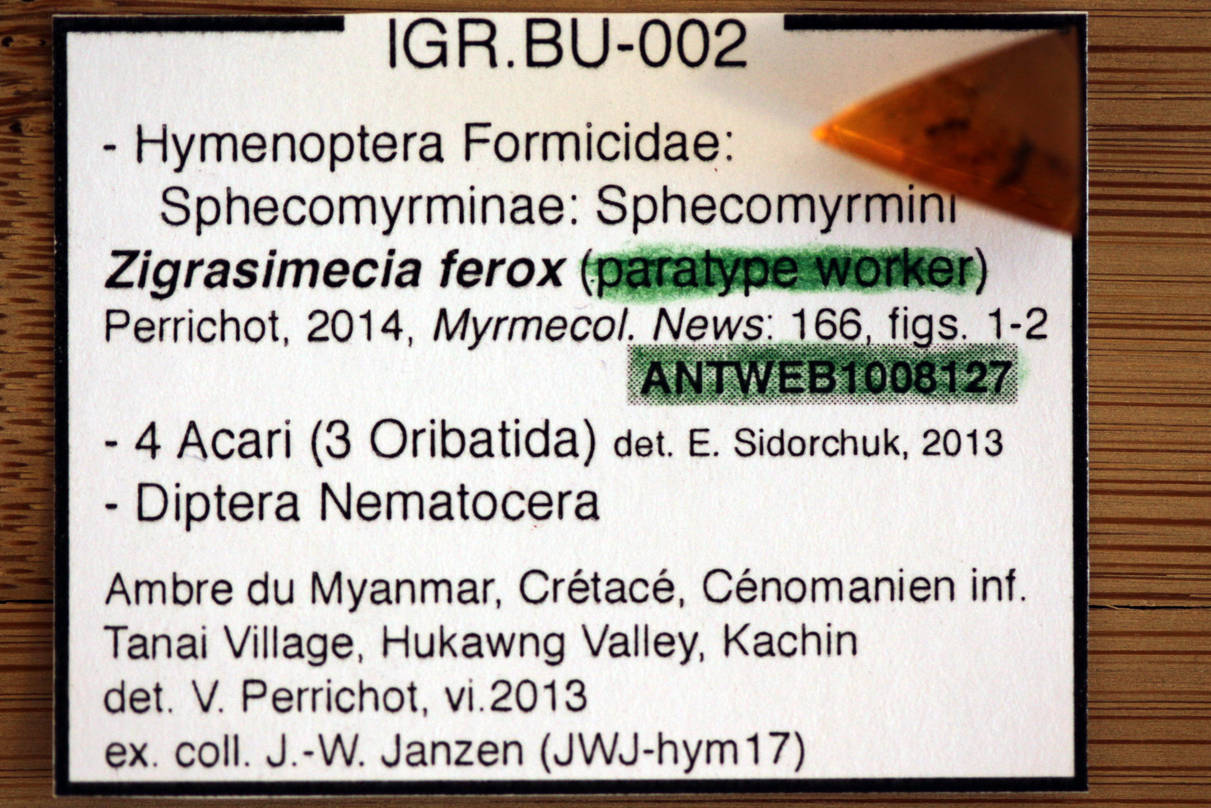
Museum tag of Z. ferox

- Hymenoptera
  - Bradynobaenidae + Apoidea
    - Chyphotes mellipes
    - - Chalybion californicum
      - Heterogyna species
  - Formicidae
    - Haidomyrmecines
      - Haidomyrmodes mammuthus
      - - Haidomyrmex scimitarus
        - Haidoterminus cippus
    - - Sphecomyrma freyi
      - Camelomecia janovitzi
      - - Myanmyrma gracilis
        - Zigrasimecia ferox
      - - Gerontoformica spiralis
        - Gerontoformica magnus
        - Gerontoformica gracilis
        - Gerontoformica pilosus
      - - Brownimecia clavata
        - Crown Group ants

== Description ==
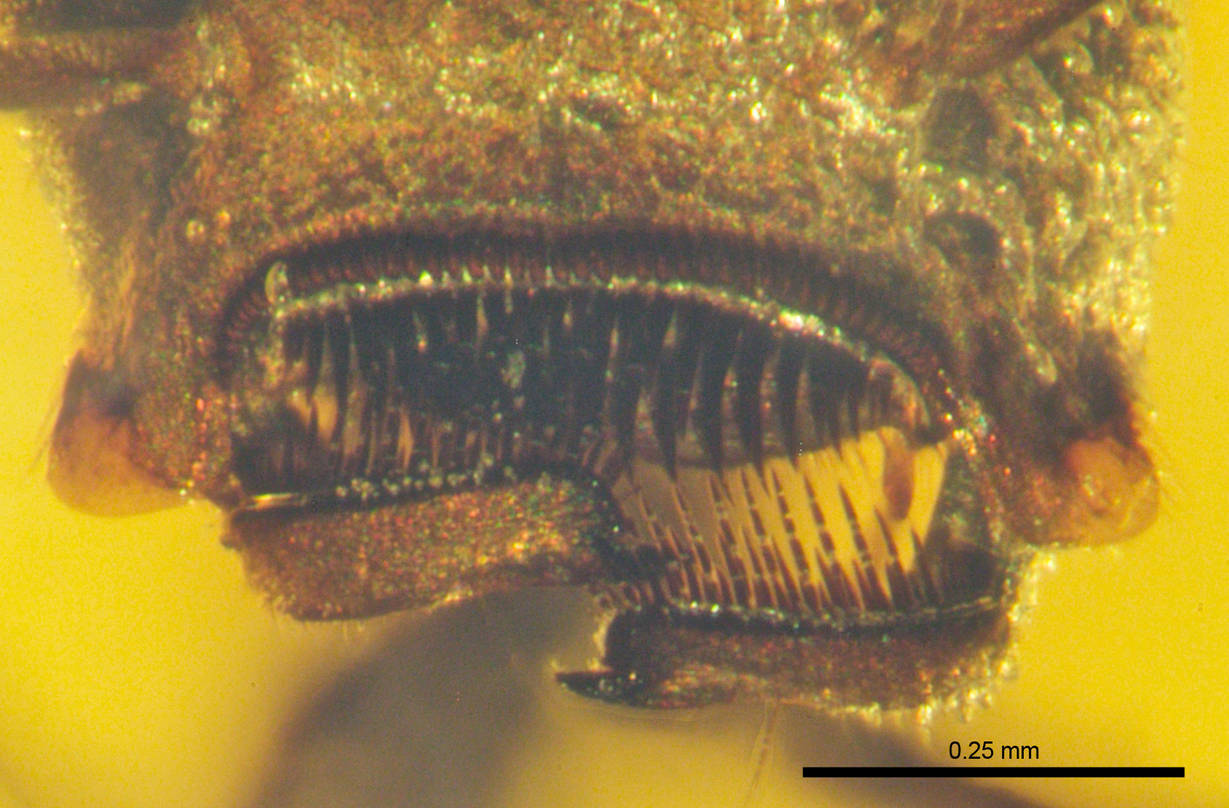
Z. ferox mandibles

Based on Z. tonsora, queens are similar in appearance to Gerontoformica based on the mandibular structure; these mandibles have two teeth, one of which is apical (situated closer to the apex) and the other is subapical (below the apex tooth). Other similar body structures include the large ocelli, short scapes, 12 antennomeres (antenna segments), small eyes, and a clypeal margin that has a row of peg-like denticles (small bumps on a tooth). Queens can be distinguished from Gerontoformica by their flattened, broad heads. They have a broad, concave clypeal margin with a high number of denticles and two short vertical rows of denticles. They have mandibles which are half the length of Gerontoformica and have a dense brush of spicule-like setae. Furthermore, the vertex (the upper surface of the head) has a pair of oval-shaped rugose (wrinkled) patches.

Z. ferox is only known from small, wingless females. The head is similar to that of queens of Z. tonsora, but they can be separated by the lack of ocelli and rugose patches found on the vertex. Only a single row of denticles is present, and the vertexal margin (seen posterodorsally) is concave. The mesosoma is smooth and contains a single spine, fovea (a pit or depression in a structure) or carina (a keel-like elevation on the body-wall of an insect). The posterior portion of the propodeal surface is concave; it is high and strongly angled. All legs have flattened femurs (the largest region of an insect's leg) and tibiae, and the tibiae are carinated both anteriorly and posteriorly. The gaster (the bulbous posterior portion of the metasoma) has five known segments. Like the queen, Z. ferox has a large, retractable stinger, in which the external part is enclosed by the gonostyli (sting sheaths).

=== Z. ferox ===
The body length of Z. ferox varies from 2.0 to 2.8 millimetres (0.079 to 0.110 in). The head in Z. ferox is broad and crescent-shaped when viewed dorsally. The frons (upper part of the insect face) is strongly convex, meaning it curves outwards and the vertexal margin concaves (curves in); it concaves either regularly or strongly. When viewing the full face, the clypeal margin (the border of the clypeus) is broad and concave. The sides are convex and small, yet protruding eyes are present. The posterior corners are round, and the base of the ants' mandibles is concealed by the large expansion of the gena (area below the compound eyes, the insect equivalent of human cheeks). The clypeus is shallow and transverse, and 48 denticles that decrease in length can be seen on the clypeal margin. The denticles are peg-shaped with rounded apices. Dense spine-like setae cover the labrum (a flap-like structure in front of the mouth); these setae are organised into three rows. Each row, on average, contains around 20 setae which increase in length when they are ventral to the clypeus. The mandibles barely overlap medially, with a single large apical tooth and a smaller subapical tooth present. The oral surface is covered in spicule-like setae, in which the inner setae are four times longer than the outer setae. The palps are short and the maxillary palps (sensory organs used for tasting and manipulating food) have five segments. The labial palps (counterparts of the maxillary palps used in sensory function for eating) presumably have three segments. The frontal carinae (a pair of cuticular ridges or flanges on the head) are absent in Z. ferox. The antennae are well separated and contain 12 antennomeres, and the scalps are also short; the toruli (socket in which the antenna of an insect articulates) is not significantly raised. The antennal scrobes (grooves in the side of the head) are shallow and project outwards from the antennal base and towards the ventral margin of the eyes.

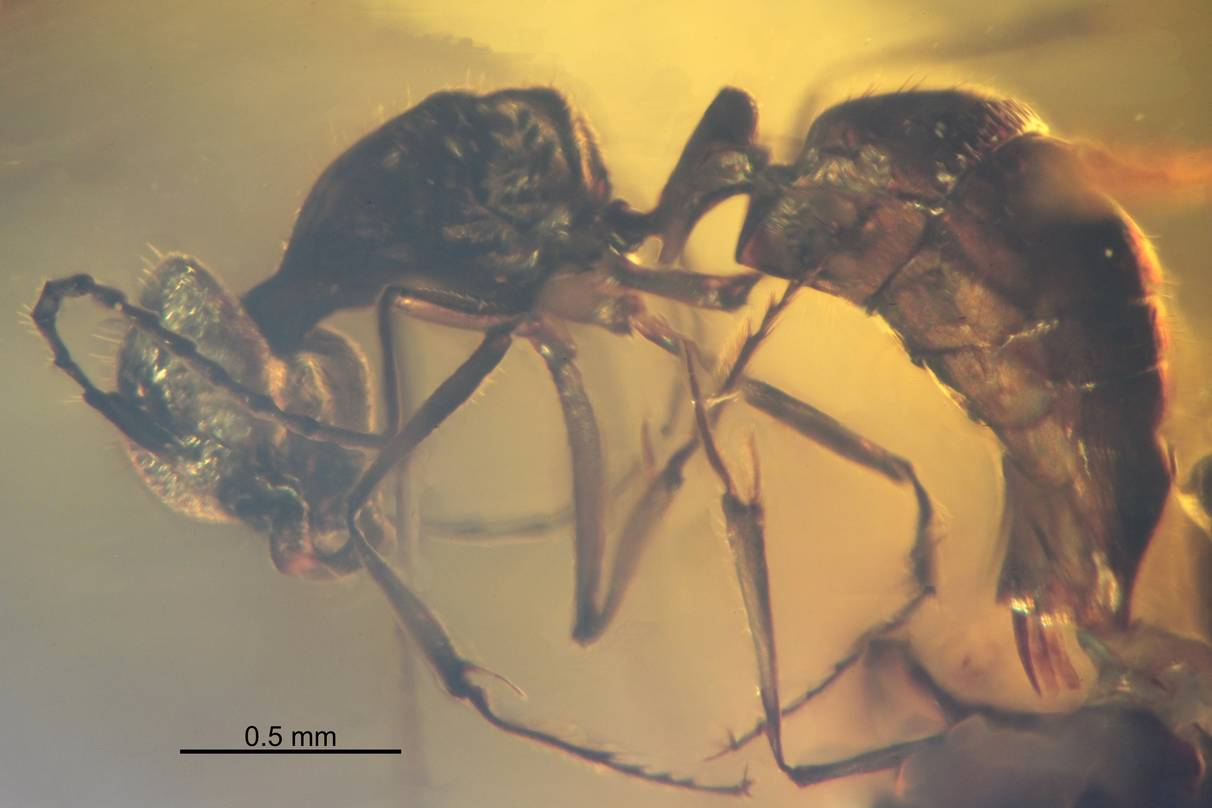
Z. ferox profile view

The mesosoma is half as broad than the head when viewed dorsally. The junction of the mesoscutellum (middle part of the scutellum) and the propodeum's dorsal surface are indistinct; on two Z. ferox specimens, these body parts are slightly angled. The propodeal dorsums posterior margin is concave. The propleuron (the lateral exoskeletal plate of the prothorax) is well developed and the mesopleuron (the lateral exoskeleton plate of the mesothorax) is separated from the rest of the mesosoma by distinct sulci (deep grooves of the head). The propodeum is high and the propodeal spiracles (external openings) are slit-like and located around the mid-regions of the propodeal sides. The opening of the metapleural gland is semicircular and the metapleural bulla (the reservoirs) is developed. On the legs, the femora and tibiae are flattened and tibiae with anterior and posterior margins are bordered by a carina. The trochantellus (proximal end of the femur) is found on all legs, and the forelegs have patches of dense and elongated setae. The protibia has three spurs; the large spur ("calcar") is curved and the other two spurs are just as long as the calcar. Pretarsal claws are present with a subapical tooth.

The gastral segments have small constrictions between the first and second segments. The stinger is long but largely internalized, and it is also stout and slightly upcurved apically. The external parts are enclosed by the gonostyli, and the sting bulb is large. The integument (a protective outer layer) is rugose throughout except on the legs and gaster. The dorsofrontal area of the head (the back of an insect), and the dorsal surfaces of the gaster, mesosoma and petiole are covered by erect hairs, and slightly longer hairs are present on the ventral regions of the mesosoma and gaster. The apical segments of the gaster have a greater density of setose (bristles) with longer decumbent hairs (meaning that these hairs are lying down).

=== Z. tonsora ===
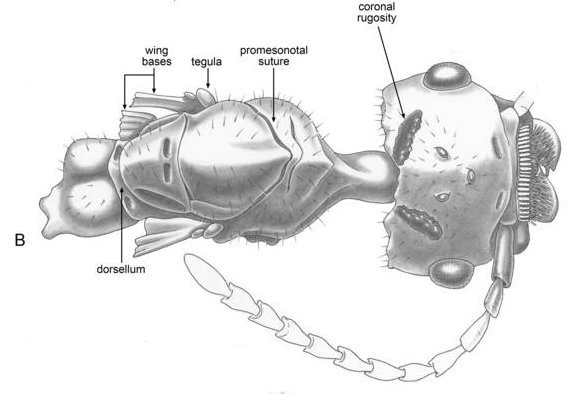
Illustration of Z. tonsora, upper view of the head and mesosoma

The broad, flattened head of Z. tonsora is 0.66 millimetres (0.026 in) in length and 0.76 millimetres (0.030 in) wide (excluding eyes). It is apparently prognathous (it has a projecting lower jaw or chin), with the cervical connection found near the head. The occipital margin (around the posterodorsal region) is irregular in dorsal view and also emarginate. The postocciput (posterior rim of the insect cranium) is concave. The eyes are small but protrude from the head, and appear drop-shaped when viewed laterally. The eyes are 0.21 millimetres (0.0083 in) and 0.13 millimetres (0.0051 in) wide and are found on the posterior half of the head. The ocelli are large, being 0.06 millimetres (0.0024 in) in diameter. A pair of oval-shaped, melanized patches of rugose cuticles are found on the vertex. The dorsofrontal side of the ants' head has fine, sparse setulae. A protruding gena can be seen, with a narrow but extended apex well past the clypeal denticles. The dorsoventral portion of the frons has shallow V-shaped grooves that extend over the antennae bases. There is no evidence of any frontal carinae. The protruding toruli obscures the base of the antenna; the antennal bases project underneath the toruli. Shallow antennal scrobes are seen and project outwards from the antennal bases and towards the ventral margin of the eyes. The antenna is 1.42 millimetres (0.056 in) long, and has a total of 12 antennomeres, with the flagellum (an antennal segment) composed of ten flagellomeres. The scapes are short, measuring 0.22 millimetres (0.0087 in), and the pedicel (the second segment of the antenna) is 0.13 millimetres (0.0051 in) The flagellomeres vary in length, ranging between 0.08 to 0.17 millimetres (0.0031 to 0.0067 in). The clypeus is shallow and measures 0.10 millimetres (0.0039 in) (when excluding the denticles). It is broad, and the distance between its lateral-most denticles is 0.44 millimetres (0.017 in). It is also more concave-shaped than it is straight. The oral margin of the clypeus is lined with a row of 30 denticles, which are peg-shaped. They also have rounded apices. The row of clypeal margin denticles is composed of two short rows. Each row is composed of 15 denticles. The mandibles are short and barely overlap medially. The mandibles measure 0.345 millimetres (0.0136 in). The dentition is simple, with a large apical tooth and a subapical tooth present. The masticatory margin contains no teeth, and the outside areas of the mandibles are concave. The oral surface of the mandibles has dense brushes of stiff, sharp and spicule-like setae. The labrum is covered in setae; the setae found here are longer, yet more narrow than the setae found on the clypeus. The palps are short. The maxillary palps have five segments, which measure 0.23 millimetres (0.0091 in).

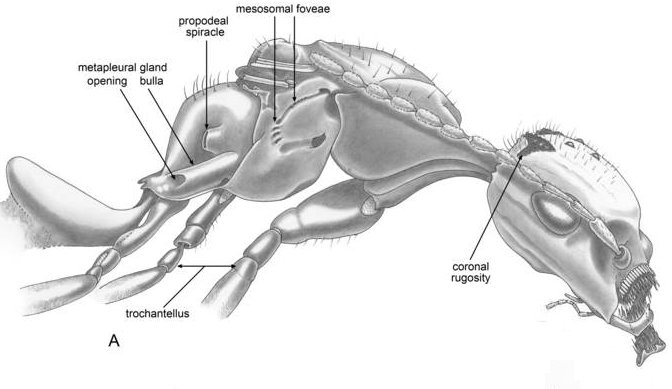
Side view of Z. tonsora

The mesosoma is 0.55 millimetres (0.022 in) wide and covered in erect setae (on the dorsal surfaces). On the propodeum, the setae are slightly recurved. The neck is long and one-quarter the length of the thorax (when excluding the propodeum). V-shaped sulci are present on the dorsomedial portion of the pronotum. The promesonotal suture (a rigid joint between two or more hard elements of an organism) is also well developed and complete. The sulcus is known to demarcate the entirety of the ants' mesoscutum and mesoscutellum. When measured, the scutellum is approximately half the length of the scutum, and the scutellums dorsal surface has a pair of deep, rectangular-shaped foveae that are located near the median line. The dorsellum is well developed and has a pair of shallow foveae. The pronotum contains little to no foveae or setae, but it is fully developed. The mesopleuron is separated from the mesosoma by complete sulci, and when viewed dorsally, it bears a series of C-shaped grooves and foveae. The propodeum measures 0.55 millimetres (0.022 in) long and sports a slit-like spiracle which faces to the rear; the posterior margin of the propodeum is shelf-like and medically emarginates. The metapleural gland has a large, crescent shaped opening and well developed metapleural bulla. Trochantellus is found on all legs, and they are very well separated from the trochanter (leg part attached rigidly to the femur) and femur on both the meso- and metathoracic legs (the middle and hindmost pair of legs). On the ventral margin, a subapical tooth can be seen on the large claws. The metasoma is mostly obscured by a large bubble. A large stinger appears to be present.

== Ecology ==
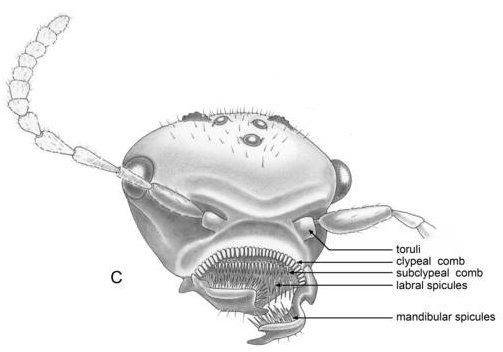
Head, frontal view. Its unusual morphology suggests that these ants had habits no longer seen in extant species.

Zigrasimecia is known for its unusual morphology, and most likely had habits no longer seen in extant species. It has a highly movable head that suggests mobility was an important factor for them (this is probably for feeding behavior). The morphology of the mandibles would have prevented nest excavation, so the rugose projections on the head may have provided assistance. There is no evidence that Cretaceous ants exhibited nesting behavior, although the queen caste in Z. tonsora suggests that a dealate queen was needed for creating nests. Also, Zigrasimecia and Gerontoformica ants coexisted with each other; this is evident as a recovered piece of amber showed both genera trapped inside. This means that the two ants may have shared some of their ecological niches and possibly interacted with each other through fighting.

It is not known what the function of the oral setae in extant species is, other than the long sensory hairs seen in some genera such as Anochetus and Odontomachus. In Zigrasimecia, the similar structures most likely did not act as trigger-hairs because they are stout and shorter. Instead, they were probably used for mechanical interactions with their food. The setae may have allowed the manipulation of liquid food, and the unification of the mandibles with other body parts, such as the clypeus and labral, indicates that they served as a trap for potential arthropod prey, particularly mites and small flies. Zigrasimecia was possibly a generalist predator.

It is evident that the mandibles were highly specialized. Like other Cretaceous ants, Zigrasimecia provides further evidence that the extinct ant fauna exhibited a great diversity of feeding behavior. The unusual mouthparts of Zigrasimecia are consistent with other extinct species found in Burmese, French, New Jersey and Canadian deposits, which also show morphologies not seen in extant ants.
