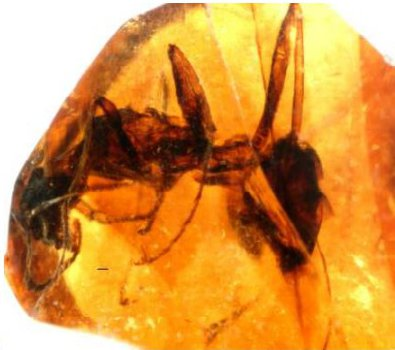
- B. canadensis holotype worker

Scientific classification
- Kingdom: Animalia
- Phylum: Arthropoda
- Class: Insecta
- Order: Hymenoptera
- Family: Formicidae
- Subfamily: †Zigrasimeciinae
- Genus: †Boltonimecia; Borysenko, 2017
- Species: †B. canadensis

Binomial name
- †Boltonimecia canadensis (Wilson, 1985)

Synonyms
- Sphecomyrma canadensis

= Boltonimecia =

Boltonimecia Temporal range: Campanian

Extinct genus of ants

Boltonimecia is an extinct genus of ant in the formicid subfamily Zigrasimeciinae. The genus contains a single described species, Boltonimecia canadensis, and is known from a single Late Cretaceous fossil which was found in Canada. The type species was originally described as a species of the extinct genus Sphecomyrma under the combination Sphecomyrma canadensis.

== History and classification ==
Boltonimecia is known from a single adult fossil, the holotype, specimen number "CAS 330" entombed in an 8 mm × 3 mm × 2 mm (0.315 in × 0.118 in × 0.079 in) amber chunk. At the time of the genus description, the specimen was residing in the Canadian National Collection of Insects, Arachnids and Nematodes, in Ottawa, Canada. The described specimen is of a worker caste adult which has been preserved as an inclusion in a transparent orange chunk of Canadian amber. The amber specimen was recovered in situ from the Taber coal zone near the top of Foremost Formation around Grassy Lake which is near Medicine Hat, Alberta, Canada. Canadian amber has been dated to an age of approximately 79–78 million years old, placing it in the Campanian of the Late Cretaceous.

Two workers were first studied by paleoentomologist E. O. Wilson in 1985, a holotype and less complete paratype, both of which were held in the collections of the Biosystematics Research Institute in Ottawa. In the type description they were placed by Wilson as a species of Sphecomyrma, Sphecomyrma canadensis, with the species name a reference to the country of discovery. The similarity of visible traits between S. freyi and "S." canadensis was mentioned by Wilson in the description, but little descriptive information distinguishing the two was provided.

It was noted in 1988 by Dlussky and Fedoseeva that the original description was based mostly on measurements alone and further that the holotype and paratype workers were likely not from the same ant genus. In 1996, Dlussky noted the antennae of "S." canadensis differed from S. freyi, having a longer first and fifth funicular segments, while in S. freyi it is the second segment which is longest.

An analysis and re-examination of the type workers was conducted by Leonid H. Borysenko of the Canadian National Collection of Insects, Arachnids and Nematodes and the results were published in a 2017 paper. While examining the holotype, Borysenko noted that most of the head along with parts of the antennae and mandibles were obscured by positioning in the amber. Sections of the specimen were re-polished and a number of new details became visible, allowing for the re-description of the extinct species into a new genus, Boltonimecia. The genus name was coined as a patronym in honor of the myrmecologist Barry Bolton. Borysenko placed Boltonimecia into a new tribe of Sphecomyrminae, Zigrasimeciini along with the sister genus Zigrasimecia. Examination of the paratype worker led Borysenko to conclude that the ant was too fragmented and no identifying characters were present, and thus not to be included as a paratype.

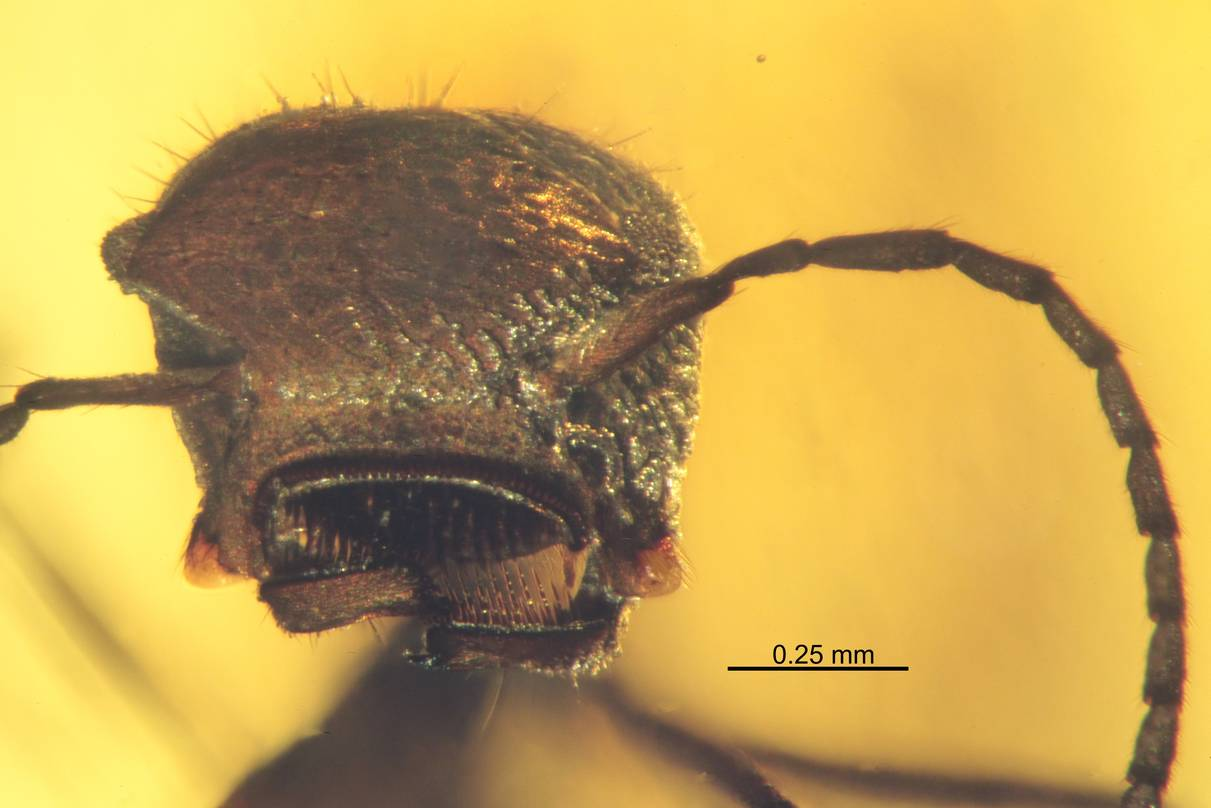
Head of Zigrasimecia ferox

== Paleohabitat ==
Analysis of the composition of Canadian amber indicates it originated as cupressaceous resins which were deposited in lagoons and salt water marshes along the Western Interior Seaway. Based on the diversity of included Ceratopogonidae flies, Borkent in 1995 suggested the paleohabitat was a mix of salt marshes, wetland pools and moist sands. This mixture is supported by the presence of Haplophragmoides species foraminiferan tests, which are indicators of brackish waters, and crocodylian scutes found associated with the amber. While few vegetative remains are found associated with Canadian amber, spectroscopic analysis and rare entombed foliage indicated the cupressaceous tree which produced the amber is likely a species of Parataxodium. Parataxodium is related to modern Taxodium and Glyptostrobus and shared a similar habitat preference of marshy areas. Boltonimecia canadensis is one of several ant species that have been described from Canadian amber, the others include Cananeuretus occidentalis, Canapone dentata, Chronomyrmex medicinehatensis, Eotapinoma macalpini, and Haidoterminus cippus.

== Description ==
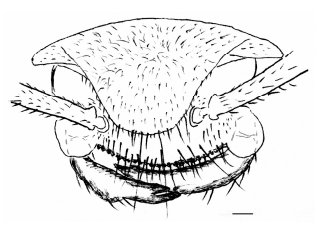
B. canadensis head, anterodorsal view

The holotype worker is 3.2 mm (0.13 in) long with an 0.73 mm (0.029 in) head and a Weber's length of 1.2 mm (0.047 in). Much of the body is the same coloration as the surrounding amber, while the lower half of the propodeum and underside of the gaster are a brown to black tone. Additionally the undersides of the coxae plus the upper halves of the tibiae are brown to black, while the upper surfaces of the head and pronotum are an opaque black tone. There is no distinct sculpturing to the exoskeleton surface.

The head is small and wider than long, with a generally triangular outline in dorsal view. The upper surface is thickened into a shield with a curved and raised profile and two elongated processes extend out and slightly forward from the rear of the head. The eyes are either reduced to such a degree that they are not visible, or are possibly lost all together, and no ocelli are visible. The clypeus is small and strongly curved, with the front margin that faces the inner sides of the mandibles covered in 25, 0.01 mm (0.00039 in) long, peg-like setae. Each mandible is curved almost 90˚ with the bases covered by the edges of the clypeus lobes. On the mandible's ends are two teeth, a smaller sub-apical one and a larger apical one with a groove that likely matches the position of the opposite mandible placement when they are closed. The antennae are distinctly 11-segmented, with a curved scape that just reaches the rear margin of the head capsule when reclined.
