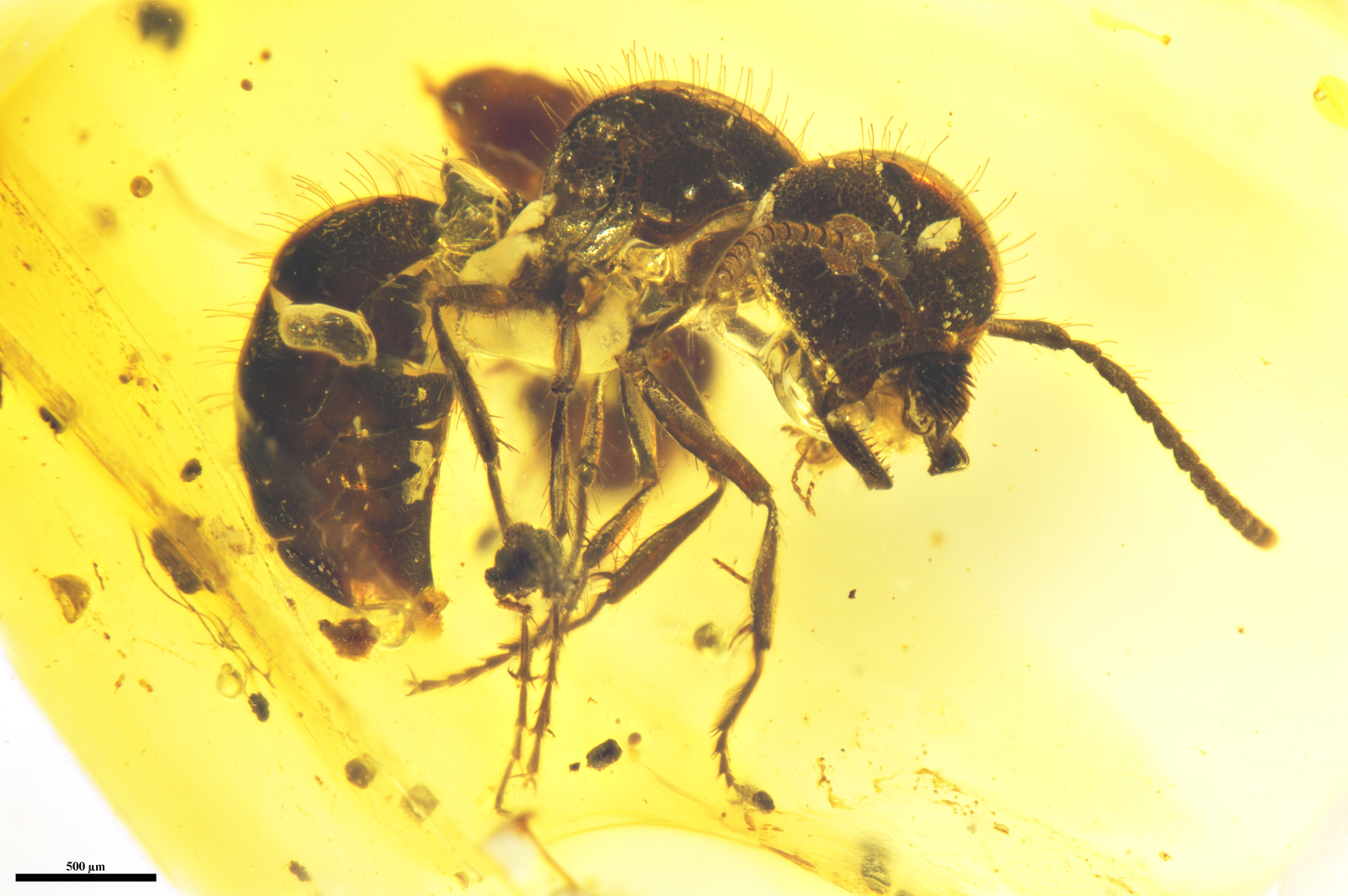
- Zigrasimecia hoelldobleri holotype worker

Scientific classification
- Kingdom: Animalia
- Phylum: Arthropoda
- Class: Insecta
- Order: Hymenoptera
- Family: Formicidae
- Subfamily: †Zigrasimeciinae; Borysenko, 2017

Genera
- See text

= Zigrasimeciinae =

Zigrasimeciinae Temporal range: Cenomanian–Campanian

Extinct subfamily of ants

Zigrasimeciinae is a subfamily of ants, known from the Cretaceous period, originally named as the tribe Zigrasimeciini within the subfamily Sphecomyrminae by Borysenko, 2017, it was elevated to full subfamily in 2020. It contains three described genera. They are sometimes known as iron-maiden ants in reference to their densely spiked mouthparts, reminiscent of an iron maiden torture device, that were likely used to trap prey. Boltonimecia canadensis was described from Campanian Canadian amber out of Alberta, Canada, while the species of Protozigrasimecia and Zigrasimecia are both exclusively known from Cenomanian Burmese amber found in Myanmar.

== Genera and species ==
- Boltonimecia Borysenko, 2017?
  - B. canadensis (Wilson, 1985)
- Protozigrasimecia Cao et al., 2020
  - P. chauli Cao et al., 2020
- Zigrasimecia Barden & Grimaldi, 2013
  - Z. boudinoti Chaul, 2023
  - Z. caohuijiae Chaul, 2023
  - Z. chuyangsui Chaul, 2023
  - Z. ferox Perrichot, 2014
  - Z. goldingot Zhuang et al. 2021
  - Z. hoelldobleri Cao et al., 2020
  - Z. perrichoti Chaul, 2023
  - Z. thate Chaul, 2023
  - Z. tonsora Barden & Grimaldi, 2013
Zigrasimeciinae species
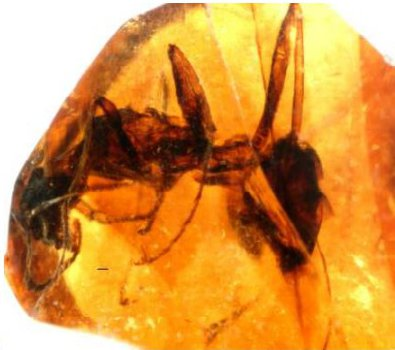
Boltonimecia canadensis

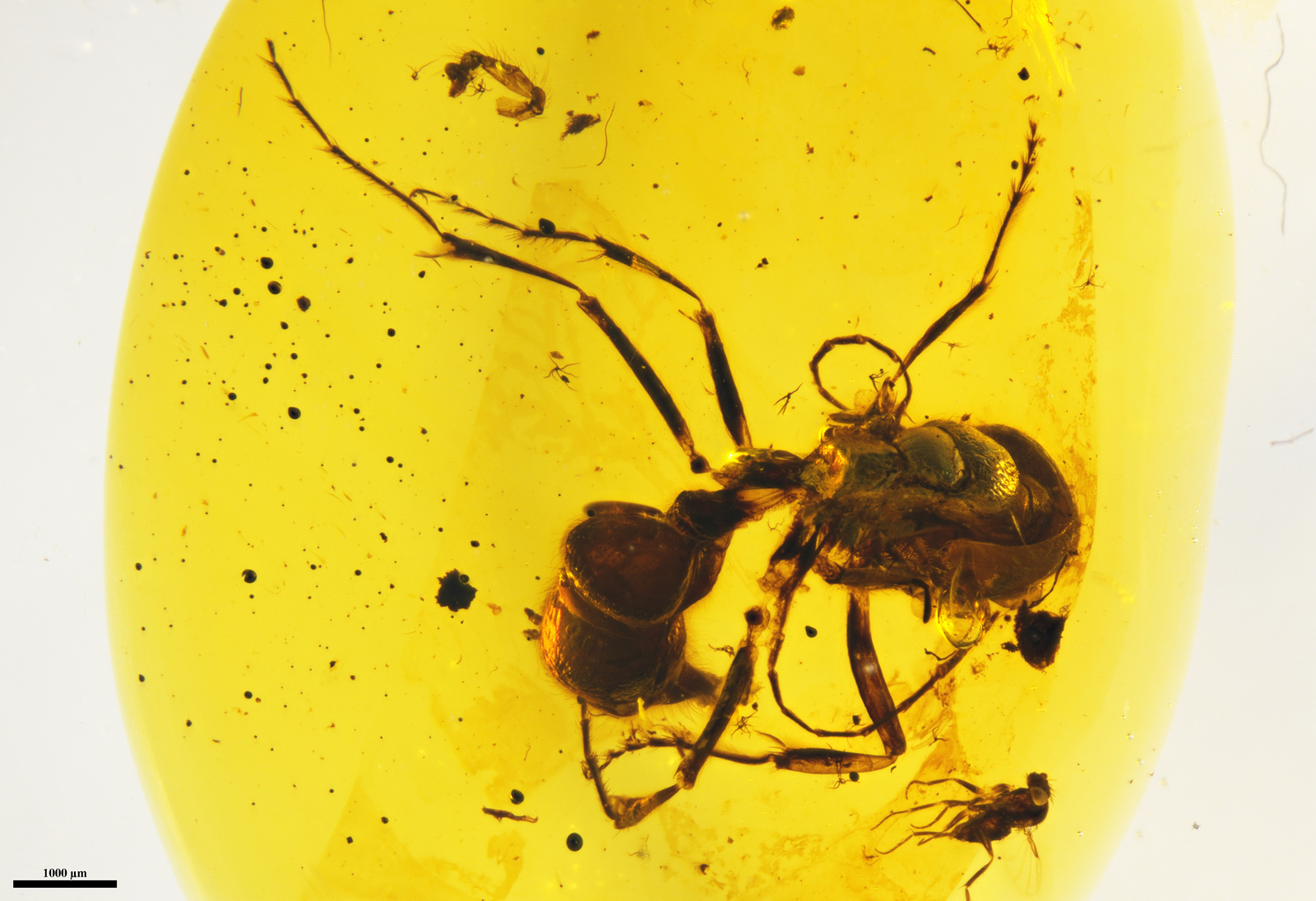
Protozigrasimecia chauli

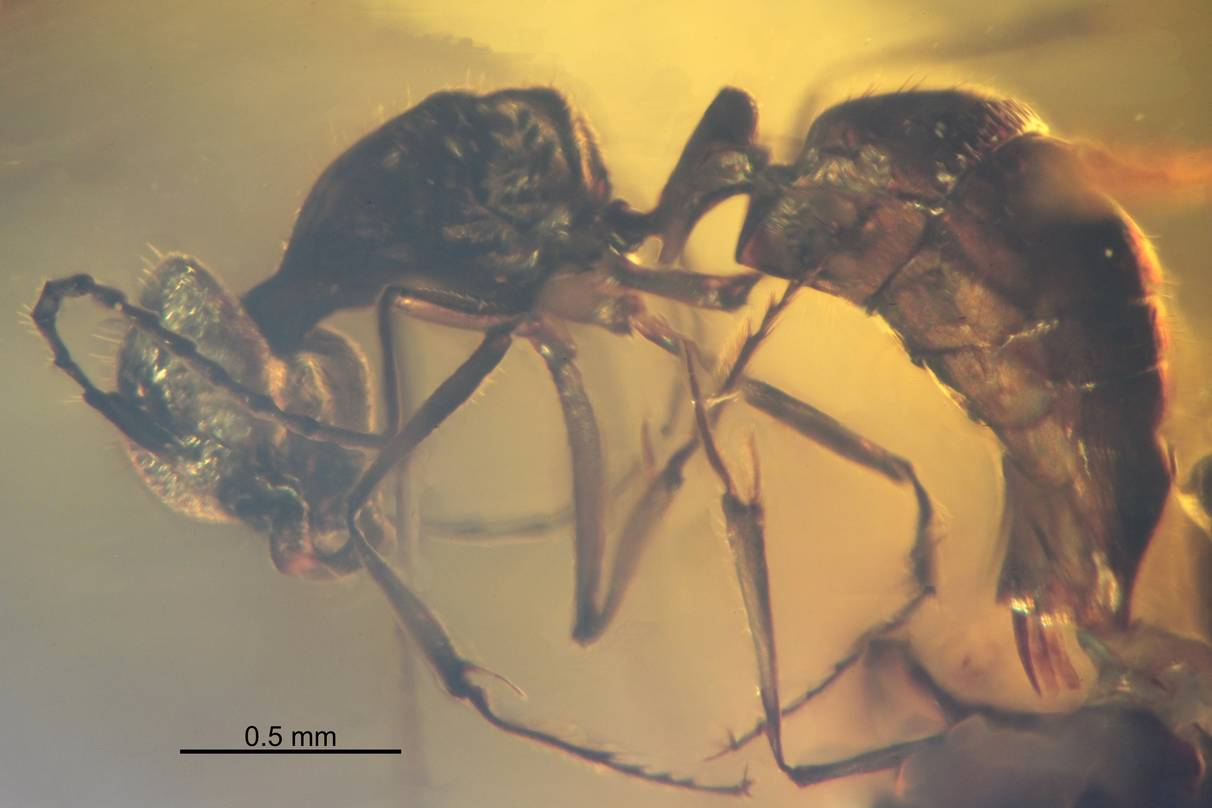
Zigrasimecia ferox

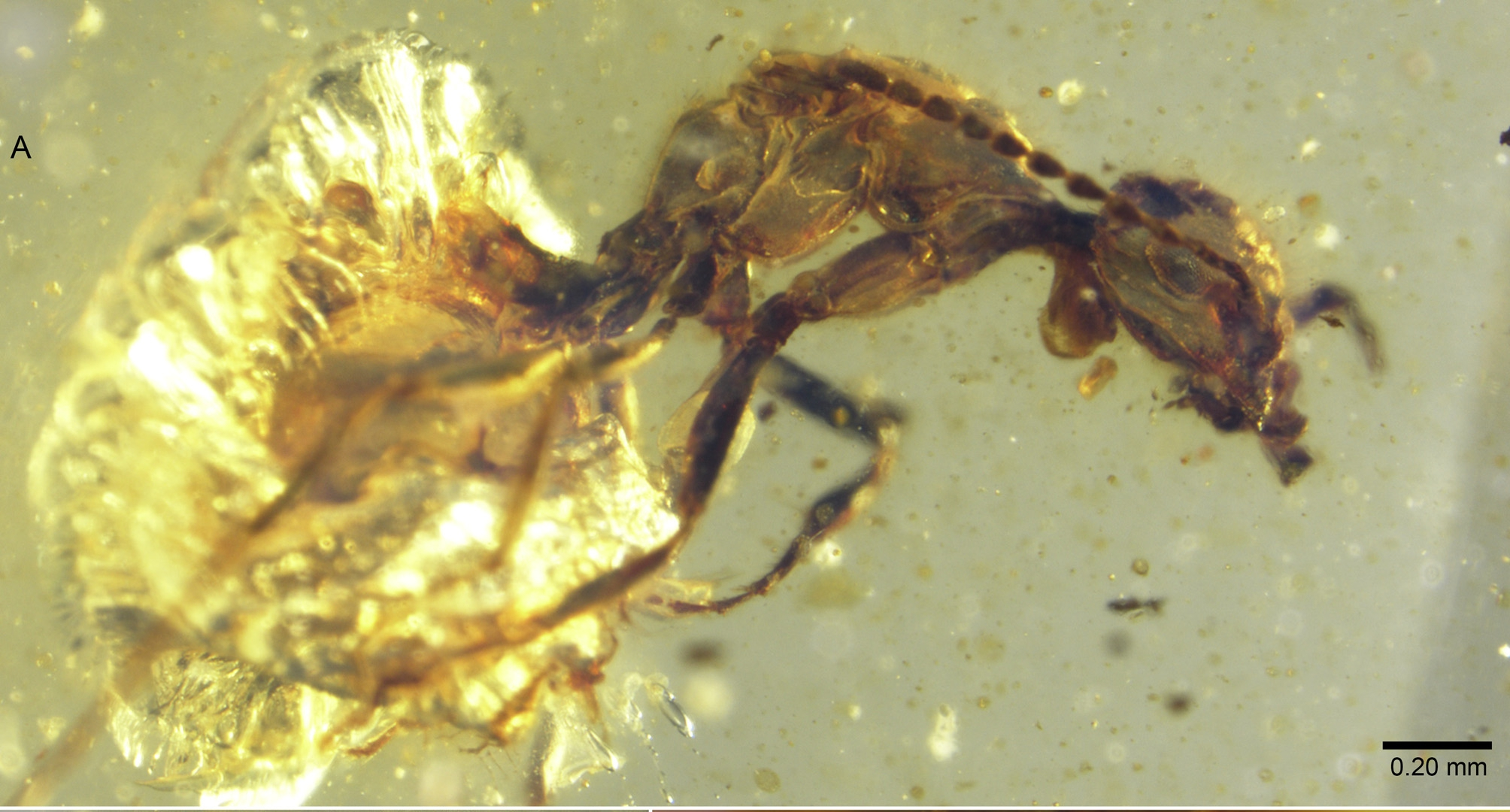
Zigrasimecia tonsora
