= Parasitic ant =

Type of ant that exploits other ant species

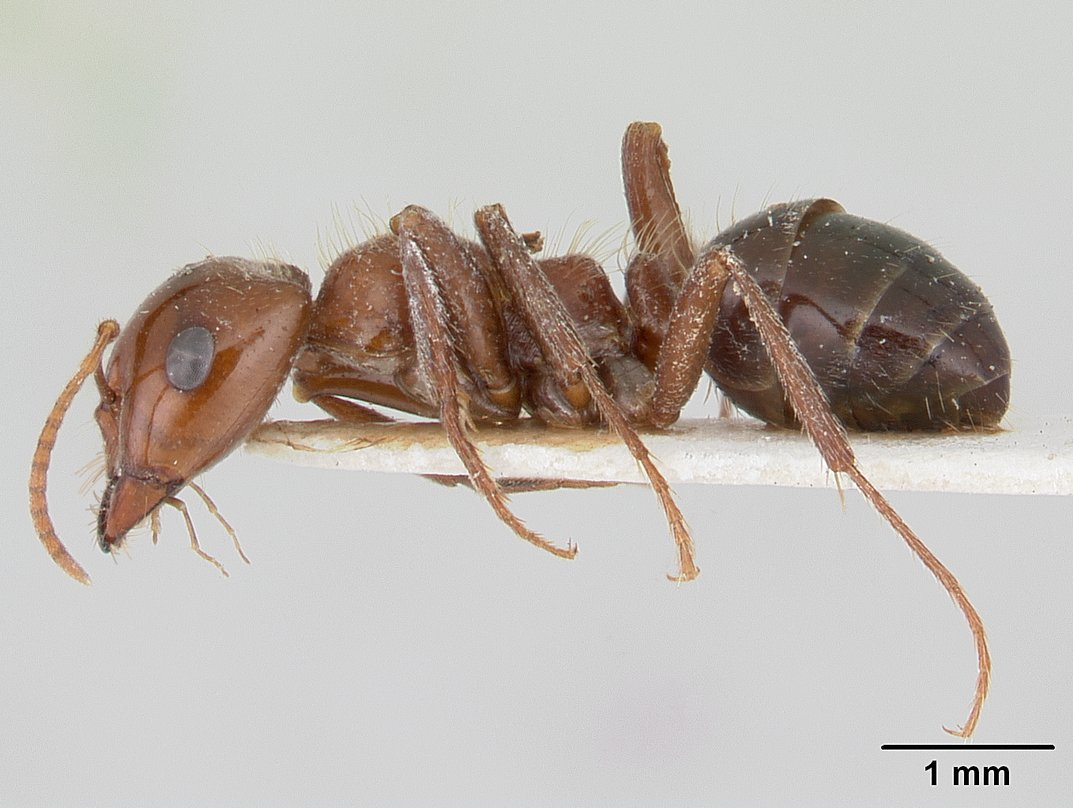
Rossomyrmex proformicarum, a species of parasitic ant

A parasitic ant is a type of ant that exploits the social structure of another ant species for its own survival and reproduction. The most common types of parasitic ants infiltrate a colony of a closely related species by using pheromones identical to those of the colony's workers to avoid conflict and blend in. The parasite lays eggs alongside existing ones for the host colony's worker ants to raise and nurture as their own. Other parasitic ants transport the host colony's pupae and larvae back to the parasite's colony, where the brood will be raised as their own. The host brood that were transported are unable to differentiate between the parasites and their own colony, and serve as worker ants for the parasites. The earliest parasitic ants most likely evolved 16 million years ago as temporary social parasites (ants that infiltrate a colony and kill the host queen).

Parasites usually cause harmful effects to the target colony and can inhibit the colony's growth and development. In some cases parasitic ants have been observed to evolve their chemical profile to reflect that of their target species, which causes them to remain undetected inside a colony for the majority of their lifespans. The parasites may also experience social parasitic syndrome, causing changes to their anatomy adapted for parasitism. Social parasitic syndrome has been identified in the genera Acromyrmex and Pseudoatta.

== Species and characteristics ==
Of the more than 12,000 species of ants, around 230 are considered parasites. The genus Formica contains many parasitic species, with over half of its 172 species confirmed or suspected to be parasites. Other genera – such as Acromyrmex (leafcutter) ants and Myrmica red ants – also show parasitic behaviors.

Typical ant colonies have at least three castes: queens, workers and drones (males). Some species also have a fourth caste of soldiers who defend the colony. However, some socially parasitic ant species have developed a separate pseudo-caste of mutated worker ants that exhibit queen-like phenotypes (visual attributes). The mutated ants contain a mutated supergene (a cluster of related genes within a chromosome) that allows them to develop traits such as wings, larger eyes and ovaries (a reproductive organ in queen ants). The mutated ants are capable of reproduction.

=== Features ===
Parasitic ant species can evolve over time to reflect the preferred host species. Rather than becoming visually homogeneous, such as matching their host's colors, they instead evolve similar anatomical shapes and features to blend in with the hosts through touch. The parasitic queen's features are also significantly altered, with the vast majority of species' queens shrunken to at least 35% of a normal queen's size.

The pheromones of parasitic ants are also altered to reflect those of the host species through a process known as rubbing. The parasite uses its mandible to attach itself to a host ant and cover its own body with the host's pheromones. The host usually responds aggressively to the parasite's mandibles. This is done so as to obtain the host's cuticular hydrocarbon profile, which is a collection of chemicals specific to each individual colony, and is used for identification among colony members. Covering themselves with the host's profile can make the parasite indistinguishable from host workers. This is done to minimize any potential conflict while the host colony is being entered. The species Formicoxenus provancheri (shampoo ant) uses a slightly different method of imitating pheromones, in which they use their glossae (tongue-like structures) to obtain the host's pheromones, then use it to cover themselves.

=== Phylogeny ===
Parasitism in ants likely first arose around 16 million years ago in the form of temporary social parasites. Entomologists disagree on the exact origins of specific parasites, but do observe that many parasitic ants are closely related to the species they parasitize, following Emery's rule. Inquiline parasitism (ants living inside the nest of a host) has evolved at least 40 separate times in ants, all within the formicoid clade. There are primarily 6 ant subfamilies that evolved inquilinism at around the same time period. Temporary social parasitism has evolved at least 60 times in multiple ant species, marked by the parasites losing the ability to form their own colonies, instead relying on taking over existing colonies of other species. Most groups of parasitic ants are monophyletic.

=== Social parasitic syndrome ===
Social parasitic syndrome is a series of changes that can occur in parasitic ant species during their transformation towards exploitative behaviors. It is usually marked by the loss of a worker caste, shrinkage of body structures and overall size, broadening of the petioles, and a reduction in mandible size. Queen ants affected by the syndrome contain a mutated supergene on chromosome 13, which causes increased egg production, altered metabolism and significantly shrunken bodies. The supergene is a collection of 200 individual genes that contribute to the syndrome's effects. The supergene is rarely not passed down to future generations. Affected queens have a similar visual appearance in size and structure to workers of their own or closely related species, with the exception of having wings. The syndrome has been identified in species of the genera Pseudoatta and Acromyrmex. After inheriting the supergene and being affected by the syndrome, the ants are no longer able to independently survive without exploiting a host colony, making them obligate parasites.

== Methods ==
There are several methods that parasitic ants use to exploit other colonies. A common method observed involves a parasitic queen ant infiltrating a colony and killing the existing queen, so as to become accepted by the hosts as a permanent member of the colony. Most parasites (excluding inquiline ants) eventually kill the host queen by either attacking the queen or killing off the workers who care for her. Some ants also utilize slave raids to transport host eggs back to their own colony to raise as their own.

=== Slaver ants ===
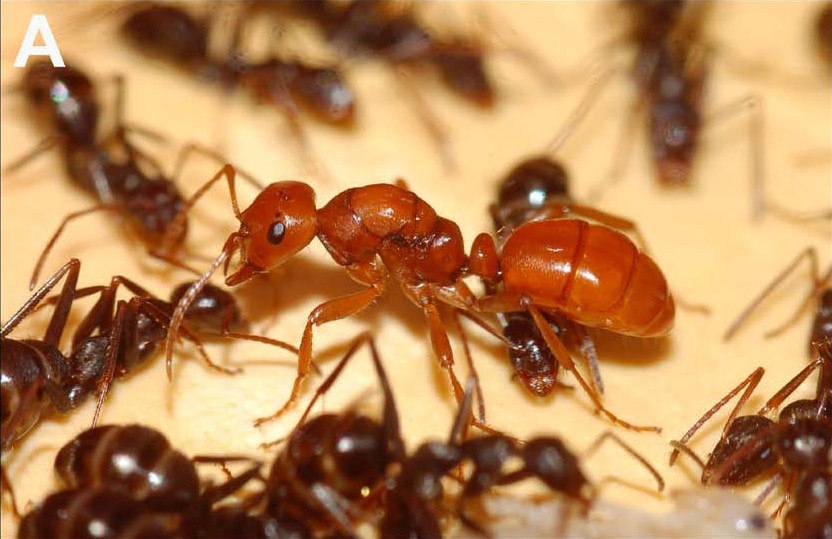
Workers tending to parasitic queen

Slaver ants are a type of parasite that enter a host colony and transport their larvae and pupae back to their own colony to raise them as their own. Around 50 individual ant species exhibit slave-making behavior. After the host's offspring hatch inside the parasite colony, they are unable to differentiate between the parasitic species and their own, and therefore behave as workers for the slaver colony.

Slaver colonies usually send out scouts to search for species nearby to infiltrate the colony with minimal conflict from host workers, before returning back to the colony to prepare for an attack known as a slave raid. They then launch a raid where they transport thousands of offspring in various stages of growth back to their own colony. The slave-making ant's bodies are specialized to parasitize either a single species or a group of related species, and are often closely related taxonomically to their hosts. Slave-makers may be either obligate parasites or facultative slave-makers. Obligate parasites are unable to independently survive without a host to exploit, whereas facultative parasites are not reliant on a host but still engage in parasitic behaviors. Slave-making behavior is unusual among ants but has evolved several times independently.

=== Temporary social parasites ===
Some parasitic ants are considered temporary social parasites, whose method of exploitation involves infiltrating a host colony and the parasitic queen killing the host queen, and then using the host workers to develop a new colony. After the host queen is killed, the parasite queen then begins laying her own eggs among existing ones. The host workers then treat the parasite as though it is their new queen. They are considered temporary as they do not depend on their hosts after their new colony is established.

Invading parasites typically disguise themselves with a similar chemical profile as the hosts through rubbing, which reduces conflict while they enter the colony. Queen ants of some socially parasitic species, such as Polyergus breviceps, are unable to care for their own offspring and are entirely reliant on a host colony to raise their brood.

Temporary social parasites eventually replace the population of the original host colony entirely. It usually takes around one year for all of the individual ants hatched prior to the parasite attack to die off. As the host queen is usually killed during the initial attack by the parasitic queen, the host colony is no longer able to lay new eggs and maintain their population. The existing workers are usually not attacked by the parasites, and are instead used to nurture and care for the parasitic brood until the host population eventually dies off.

==== Guest ants ====
Some species of the genus Megalomyrmex, also known as parasitic guest ants, are social parasites that live among and consume the food and brood of fungus-growing ants. Examples include M. adamsae, M. mondabora, M. symmetochus and M. wettereri. These ants target fungus-growing ants as the hosts do not have a soldier caste and the mandibles are significantly weaker than that of the parasites', making it difficult for the hosts to keep them out. Guest ants do not mimic the cuticular hydrocarbon profile of their hosts. Instead, they possess an alkaloid venom that is used to pacify the host colony so they can consume the host's food and offspring with less resistance. The venom can be detected by other ants outside the host colony, so host ants often allow the parasites to reside inside of the nest to deter nearby hostile ant colonies despite their negative effects.

=== Inquiline ants ===
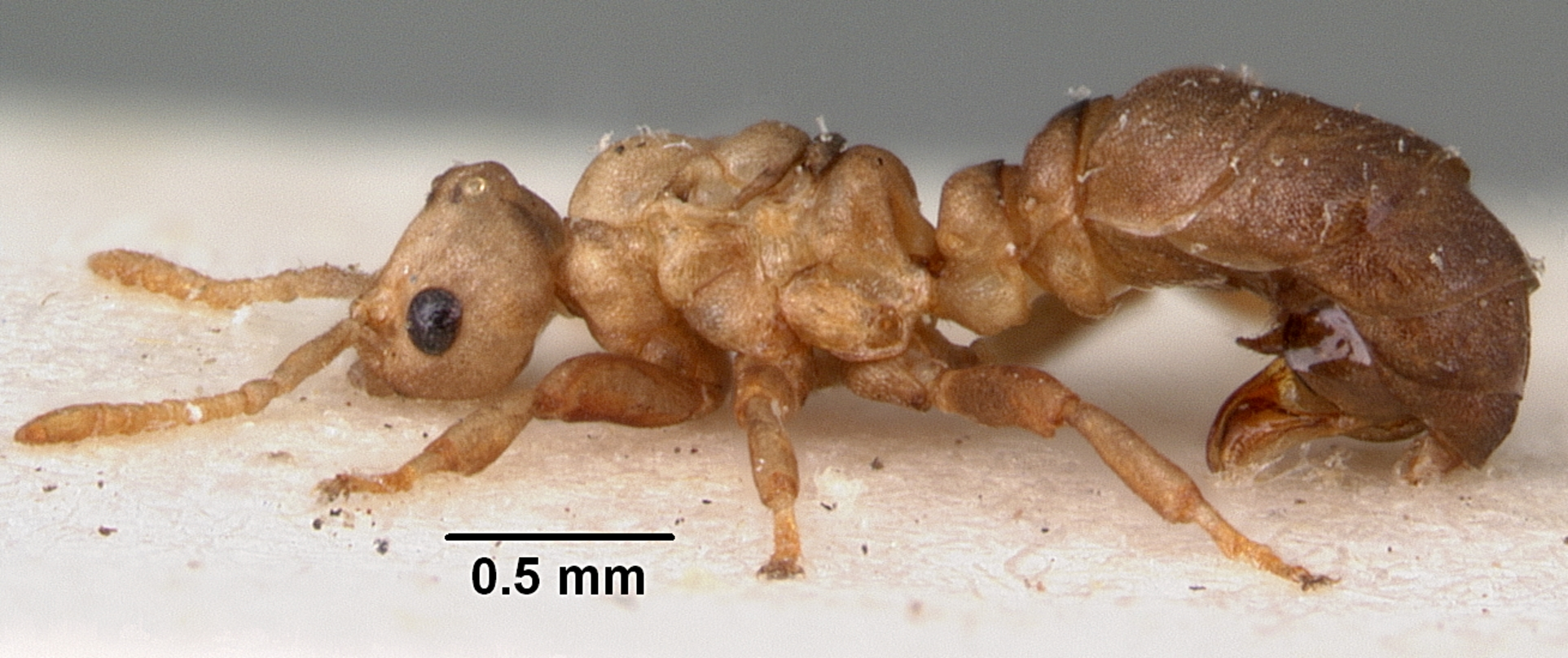
Tetramorium atratulum, a species of inquiline ant

Inquiline ants are a type of social parasite that exhibit permanent social parasitism. This is considered the most extreme form of parasitism in ants. There are around 100 ant species that have evolved to exhibit inquiline behavior. These ants are typically not hostile to the host colony and co-exist with the present host queen. These ants live in their host colony for the vast majority of their lifespan. Inquiline queens leave their home colony in search of a host one, leaving the queens workerless and forcing them to rely on the host colony's workers to provide for their grooming and feeding needs. The ants practice polygyny with the male hosts, with the males mating simultaneously with the parasite and the existing queen. While they are not physically hostile to the hosts, the eggs they lay among the host colony's divert resources away from the host's, harming the fitness of the host's children. The inquiline parasite's brood almost always have anatomy capable of reproduction.

Almost all inquiline ants follow Emery's rule, which is a trend of social parasites that suggests social parasites should be closely related to each other taxonomically. They usually follow either the strict form of Emery's rule (ants that are from the same genus) or the relaxed form (from the same or similar family). Following of Emery's rule is one of the major distinctions of inquiline ants from temporary social parasites. Studies have shown polygyny between a parasitic queen and host males may have been the origin of inquiline parasitism in ants.

==== Rodeo ants ====
Some species of Solenopsis (fire ants) may attach themselves to the backs of other ants in a parasitic fashion, where they can infiltrate a host colony easier. These rodeo ants clamp onto the thorax of a host ant (usually the queen), and cover themselves with the pheromones of the ant to remain undetected by the rest of the colony. All rodeo ants are queens and therefore lack workers to care for them, so the parasite lays her eggs off the back of the host ant alongside the host's brood, in an effort to convince the host colony to raise the parasite's offspring. These ants have not been identified outside the US state of Texas.

== Effects on host colony ==
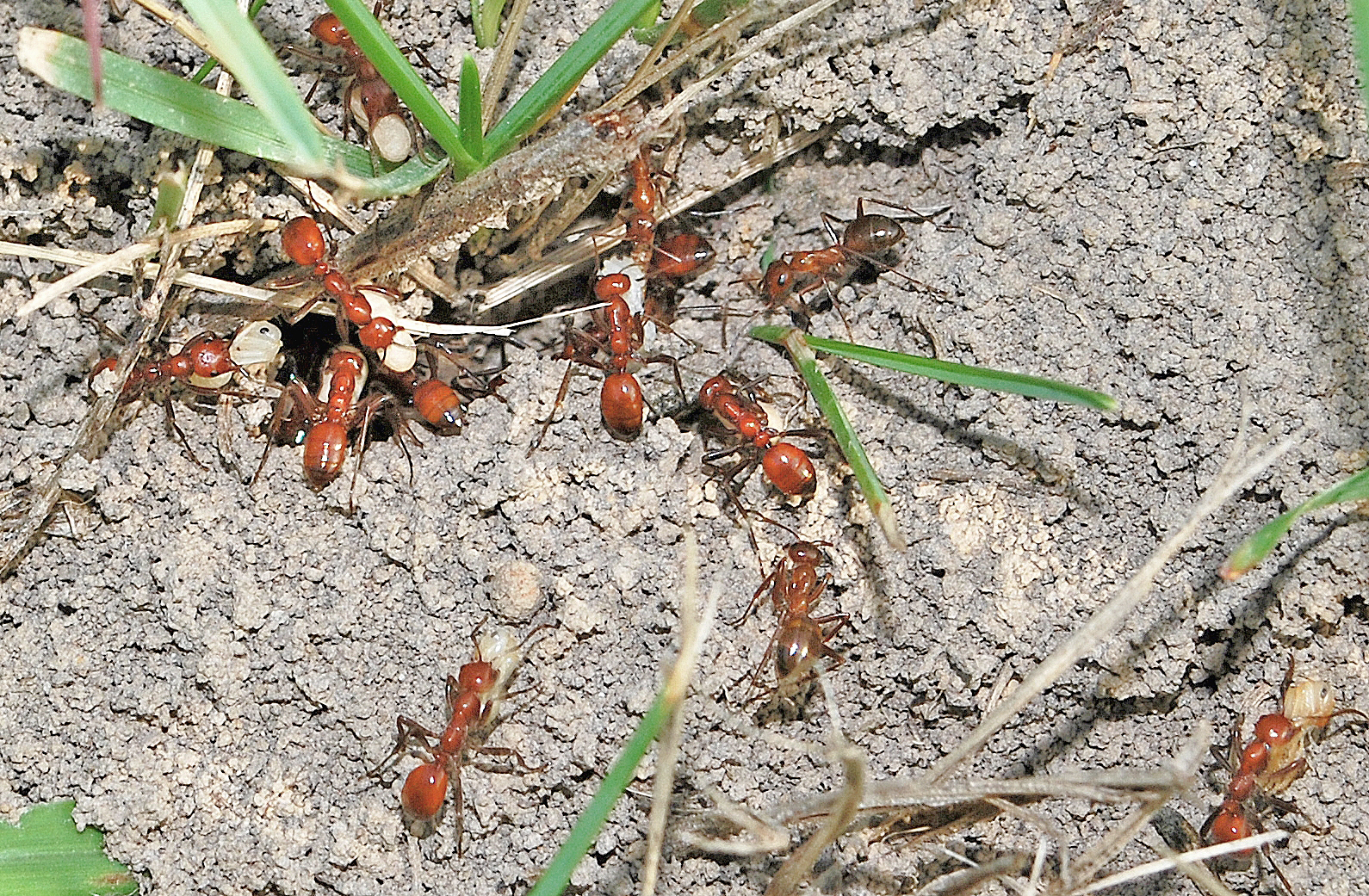
Polyergus lucidus raiding a Formica incerta nest

Depending on the method of parasitism, effects on the host colony can vary drastically. If a host colony is repeatedly subjected to slave raids, their ability to replenish their workers is significantly reduced and may eventually lead to colony collapse. Colonies subjected to temporary social parasites may gradually experience a decline in their population as offspring from the new parasite queen replace the existing host workforce. Parasitic queens do not productively contribute any resources or support to the host colony, and sometimes remove the wings of potential queens. The resources and care that are usually devoted to a host colony's own brood are used for the parasite's offspring, which can lead to significantly less healthy host worker ants.

Parasites can cause an evolutionary arms race against their hosts, with colonies rapidly evolving to develop methods to attack and defend against each other. Some parasites have developed a chemical toxin that is released from their Dufour's gland. This toxin can induce infighting among the host colony, allowing the parasites to more easily infiltrate and exploit the host colony. Chemicals used by permanent inquiline hosts can also influence the genes and behaviors of the host.

=== Colony defense ===
When a parasitized host colony is raided by a separate colony, some inquiline (permanent) parasitic ants residing inside the colony have been observed defending the hosts from the raiding colony. Parasites release an alkaloid venom to help deter the attackers from beginning a raid. They also use violence to scare off or kill raiders who ignore chemical deterrents. Scouts from raiding colonies can detect whether or not a colony has social parasites within, and the presence of parasites can be enough to discourage raids from beginning in the first place.

== Parasite–host pairs ==
Reviews conducted by Alfred Buschinger (1986 and 1997), Bert Hölldobler (1990) and Edward O. Wilson (1971) have mapped out a list of parasite–host pairs:

Examples of parasite–host associations
Parasite group	Parasite species	Host	Type of association	Reference(s)
Formicinae	R. minuchae, R. proformicarum	Proformica	Slave-making	
Formicinae	P. breviceps, P. ludicus, P. nigerrimus, P. rufescens, P. samurai	Formica	Slave-making or temporary social parasite	
Formicinae	F. sanguinea and 11 other spp. formerly considered to be Raptiformica	Formica	Slave-making	
Myrmicinae: Formicoxenini	C. muellerianus and 7 other spp. (not all are active slave makers)	Leptothorax (Myrafant)	Slave-making	
Myrmicinae: Formicoxenini	E. algeriana, E. bernardi, E. ravouxi, E. stumperi and 8 other spp.	Leptothorax (Myrafant)	Slave-making	
Myrmicinae: Formicoxenini	H. candensis, H. sublaevis, H. zaisanicus	Leptothorax sensu stricto	Slave-making	
Myrmicinae: Formicoxenini	L. duloticus	Leptothorax (Myrafant)	Slave-making	
Myrmicinae: Formicoxenini	Pr. americanus	Leptothorax (Myrafant)	Slave-making	
Myrmicinae: Crematogastrini	M. ravouxi	Temnothorax	Slave-making	
Myrmicinae: Tetramoriini	26 spp.	Tetramorium	Slave-making	
Myrmicinae: Solenopsidini	M. adamsae, M. mondabora, M. symmetochus and M. wettereri		Guest	
Myrmicinae	T. inquilinum, T. albenae (in a species complex)	Tetramorium	Inquiline	

== See also ==
- Brood parasitism
- Host–parasite coevolution

== Sources ==
- Topoff, H. (1999). "Slave-making queens". Scientific American. 281 (5): 84–90. Bibcode:1999SciAm.281e..84T. doi:10.1038/scientificamerican1199-84.
- D'Ettorre, Patrizia; Heinze, Jürgen (2001). "Sociobiology of slave-making ants". Acta Ethologica. 3 (2): 67–82. doi:10.1007/s102110100038.
- Delattre, O.; Blatrix, R. S.; Châline, N.; Chameron, S. P.; Fédou, A.; Leroy, C.; Jaisson, P. (2012). "Do host species evolve a specific response to slave-making ants?". Frontiers in Zoology. 9 (38): 1–10. doi:10.1186/1742-9994-9-38. PMC 3551654. PMID 23276325.
- Longino, John T. (2010). "A taxonomic review of the ant genus Megalomyrmex Forel (Hymenoptera: Formicidae) in Central America" (PDF). Zootaxa. 2720: 35–58. doi:10.11646/zootaxa.2720.1.3. Archived (PDF) from the original on 2016-03-04.
- Mori, A.; D'Ettorre, P.; Le Moli, F. (1994). "Mating and post-mating behaviour of the European amazon ant, Polyergus rufescens (Hymenoptera, Formicidae)". Bolletino di Zoologia. 61 (3): 203–206. doi:10.1080/11250009409355886.
- Schrader; Pan (2021). "Relaxed selection underlies genome erosion in socially parasitic ant species". Nature Communications. 12 (1) 2918. Bibcode:2021NatCo..12.2918S. doi:10.1038/s41467-021-23178-w. PMC 8131649. PMID 34006882.
- Drumond; Oldroyd (2000). "Drumond, P., Oldroyd, B. & Osborne, K. Worker reproduction in Austroplebeia australis Friese (Hymenoptera, Apidae, Meliponini)". Insectes Soc. 47. doi:10.1007/PL00001725.
