= Megalomyrmex nocarina =

Scientific classification
- Domain: Eukaryota
- Kingdom: Animalia
- Phylum: Arthropoda
- Class: Insecta
- Order: Hymenoptera
- Family: Formicidae
- Subfamily: Myrmicinae
- Genus: Megalomyrmex
- Species: M. nocarina

Binomial name
- Megalomyrmex nocarina Longino, 2010

Species of ant

Megalomyrmex nocarina is a Neotropical species of ants in the subfamily Myrmicinae. Megalomyrmex nocarina occurs in mature wet forest habitats of the Atlantic slope of Costa Rica. It occurs from near sea level to 1110 m elevation. It is known exclusively as isolated workers in Winkler samples of forest floor litter.

Megalomyrmex nocarina is very easy to confuse with M. mondabora and M. mondaboroides, but the lack of a strong foraminal carina is reliably diagnostic. Also, the basal mandibular teeth are slightly larger and fewer in number. The nesting and feeding habits of nocarina remain to be discovered, but the similarity to M. mondabora and M. mondaboroides suggest that nocarina, too, might be a specialized predator or social parasite of Attini.
