= Ergatoid =

Wingless reproductive ant or termite

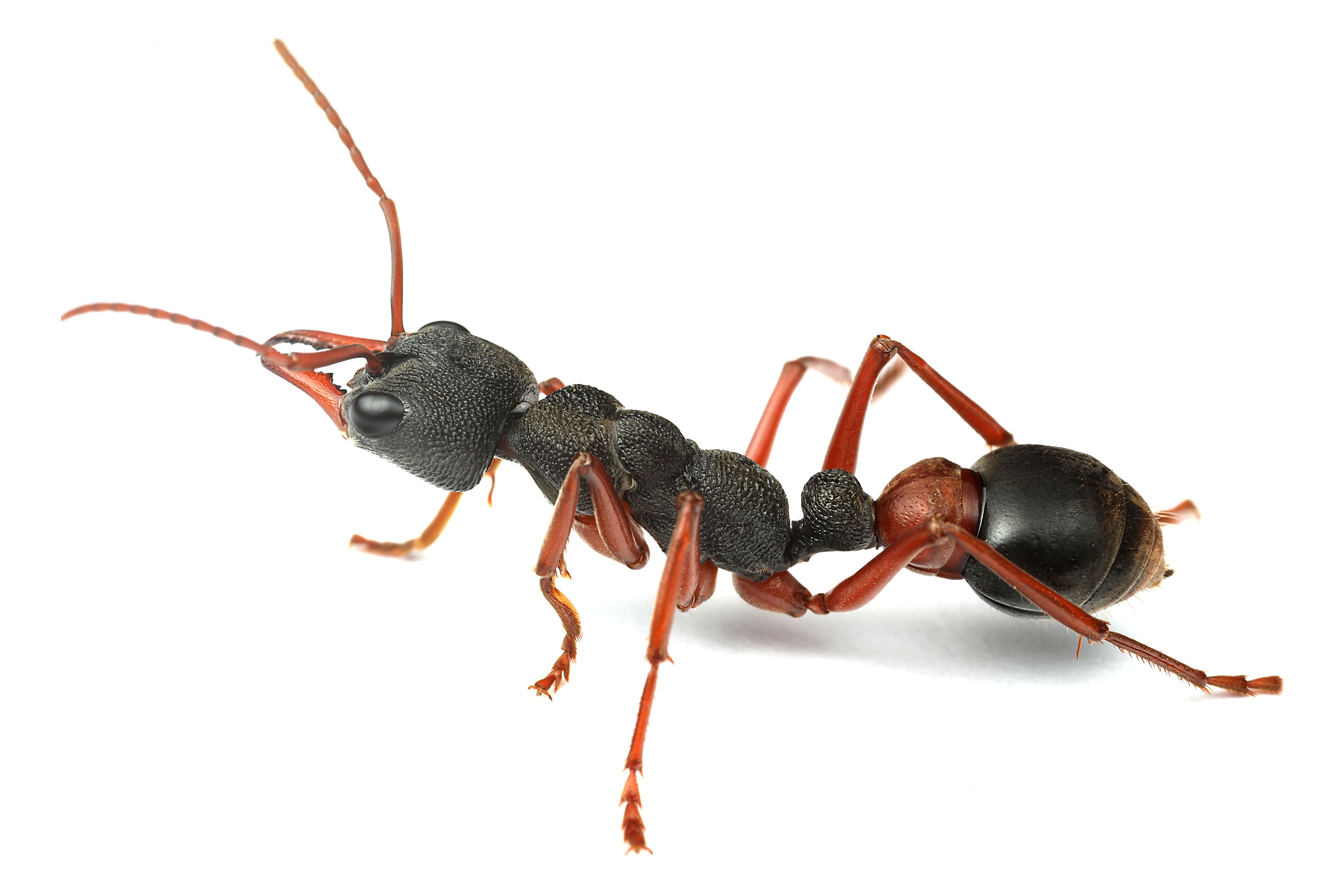
An ergatoid queen of the species Myrmecia esuriens

An ergatoid (from Greek ergat-, "worker" + -oid, "like") is a permanently wingless reproductive adult ant or termite. The similar but somewhat ambiguous term ergatogyne refers to any intermediate form between workers and standard gynes. Ergatoid queens are distinct from other ergatogyne individuals in that they are morphologically consistent within a species and are always capable of mating, whereas inter caste individuals, another class of ergatogynes, often are not. Ergatoids can exhibit wide morphological differences between species, sometimes appearing almost identical to normal workers and other times being quite distinct from both workers and standard queens. In addition to morphological features, ergatoids among different species can exhibit a wide range of behaviors, with some ergatoids acting only as reproductives and others actively foraging. Ergatoid queens have developed among a large number of ant species, and their presence within colonies can often provide clues on the social structures of colonies and as to how new colonies are founded. Without wings, almost all species of ants that solely produce ergatoid queens establish new colonies by fission.

== Nomenclature ==
The term ergatoid has been used to denote wingless reproductive ants since Margaret Holliday's 1903 paper, "A study of a few ergatogynic ants", although its current usage was suggested and more completely defined in the 1991 paper, "Ergatoid queens and intercastes in ants: two distinct adult forms which look morphologically intermediate between workers and winged queens", by C.P. Peeters. The paper, "Intercastes, intermorphs, and ergatoid queens: who is who in ant reproduction?" provided further definition and discussion of how certain "intermorphic queens" should be denoted in 1998.

== Morphology ==
The defining morphological features of all ergatoids include functional reproductive organs, which include spermathecae and numerous ovarioles in females and a lack of wings at any point in their life history. Whereas standard queens shed their wings after mating, ergatoids never develop wings, and thus, they must disperse on foot. Other than these key, defining traits, ergatoid queen morphology can vary widely among species. Some species' ergatoids look quite similar to workers of the species, whereas other species' ergatoids can exhibit extreme morphologies that make them highly distinct.

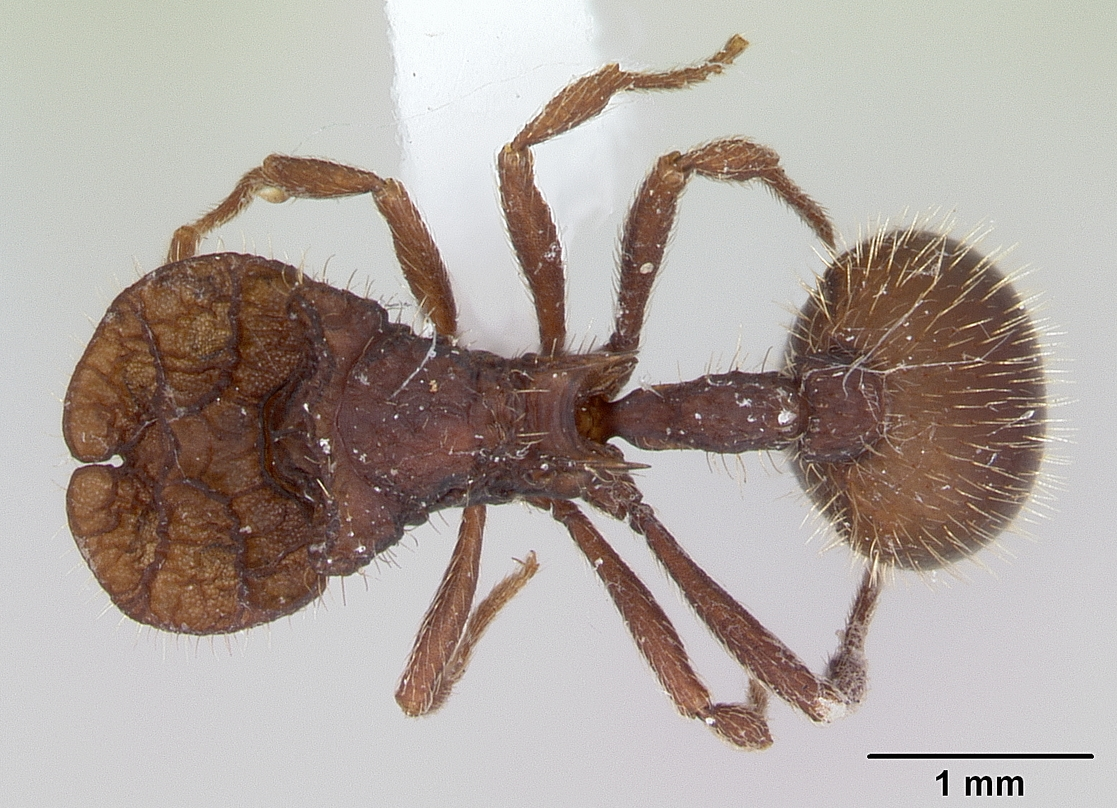
This top-down view of an ergatoid queen of Blepharidatta conops is a good example of the extreme morphologies that ergatoids can have.

=== Variation among species ===
Ergatoid morphology can vary greatly among different species, even within the same genus. For example, one paper found that the ergatoid queens of Megalomyrmex foreli are distinct from workers, with an enlarged gaster, while the ergatoid queens of closely related Megalomyrmex wallacei are very similar in size to their workers. Army ant ergatoids are much larger than workers, with large gasters that help them to maintain millions of ants that can make up army ant colonies. The ergatoid queens of the species Blepharidatta conops are quite morphologically distinct as well, with an enlarged head used to wall off the nest entrance in the case of invasion by predators.

=== Ergatoid males ===
The species Cardiocondyla obscurior produces both regular, winged males and ergatoid males. In addition to the loss of wings, male C. obscurior have altered eye structure and pigmentation, larger bodies, and lifelong spermatogenesis. In addition to their morphological changes, male C. obscurior ergatoids exhibit high levels of aggression toward each other, so much so that they have been dubbed local fighter ants. Similar morphology and behavior has been noted in Cardiocondyla nuda, which only produces ergatoid males.

== Behavior ==
As with morphology, ergatoid behavior varies greatly among species. In many species, ergatoids are quite numerous, and un-mated ergatoids exhibit the same foraging behaviors that workers do. In other species, such as the army ant species, ergatoids live solely to reproduce. Colony formation behavior in most ergatoid queens is starkly different than in most winged queens.

=== Colony formation ===
Without wings, ergatoid queens founding new colonies disperse on foot. In the vast majority ergatoid-producing species, new colonies are founded by fission when a mated ergatoid and a group of workers disperse to a new nesting site; this is commonly known as dependent colony formation, or DCF. Only 3 species' ergatoid queens, all from the genus Pogonomyrmex (harvester ants), have been shown to practice independent colony formation, or ICF.

== Evolution ==
The production of ergatoid queens has developed across at least 16 subfamilies and 55 genera. It has been suggested that this convergent evolution toward ergatoids stems from the DCF behavior that most ergatoid-producing species exhibit. It has also been suggested that the production of ergatoid queens is advantageous as it is less costly, and ergatoid queens may have higher survival rates than winged, independent colony forming queens.

== See also ==
- Alate
- Gamergate (ant)
- Gyne
- Queen ant
