= M. silvestrii =

M. silvestrii may refer to:

- Megalomyrmex silvestrii, Wheeler, 1909, an ant species in the genus Megalomyrmex
- Mosfora silvestrii, Roewer, 1925, a harvestman species in the genus Mosfora and the family Epedanidae found in Funkiko
- Myrmica silvestrii, Wheeler, an ant species in the genus Myrmica

== See also ==
- Silvestrii (disambiguation)
