= Megalomyrmex miri =

Scientific classification
- Domain: Eukaryota
- Kingdom: Animalia
- Phylum: Arthropoda
- Class: Insecta
- Order: Hymenoptera
- Family: Formicidae
- Subfamily: Myrmicinae
- Genus: Megalomyrmex
- Species: M. miri

Binomial name
- Megalomyrmex miri Brandão, 1990

Species of ant

Megalomyrmex miri is a Neotropical species of ants in the subfamily Myrmicinae. Known from Costa Rica. This species is known only from the type specimens and has no biological data. It is extremely similar to M. wettereri in color, size, shape, measurements, and pilosity. It differs in having a complete foraminal carina and some transverse rugosities on the anteroventral petiolar process.
