= Megalomyrmex adamsae =

Scientific classification
- Domain: Eukaryota
- Kingdom: Animalia
- Phylum: Arthropoda
- Class: Insecta
- Order: Hymenoptera
- Family: Formicidae
- Subfamily: Myrmicinae
- Genus: Megalomyrmex
- Species: M. adamsae

Binomial name
- Megalomyrmex adamsae Longino, 2010

Species of ant

Megalomyrmex adamsae is a Neotropical species of ants in the subfamily Myrmicinae. Megalomyrmex adamsae, known from Panama, is very similar to M. symmetochus, known from Costa Rica to Panama.

== Biology ==
Megalomyrmex adamsae is a specialized social parasite of Attini, like its close relative M. symmetochus. Colonies cohabit nests with their attine hosts as "guest ants," feeding on fungal mycelia and attine brood. Megalomyrmex adamsae and M. symmetochus differ in host preference: M. adamsae is typically found in Trachymyrmex nests, M. symmetochus in Sericomyrmex nests.
