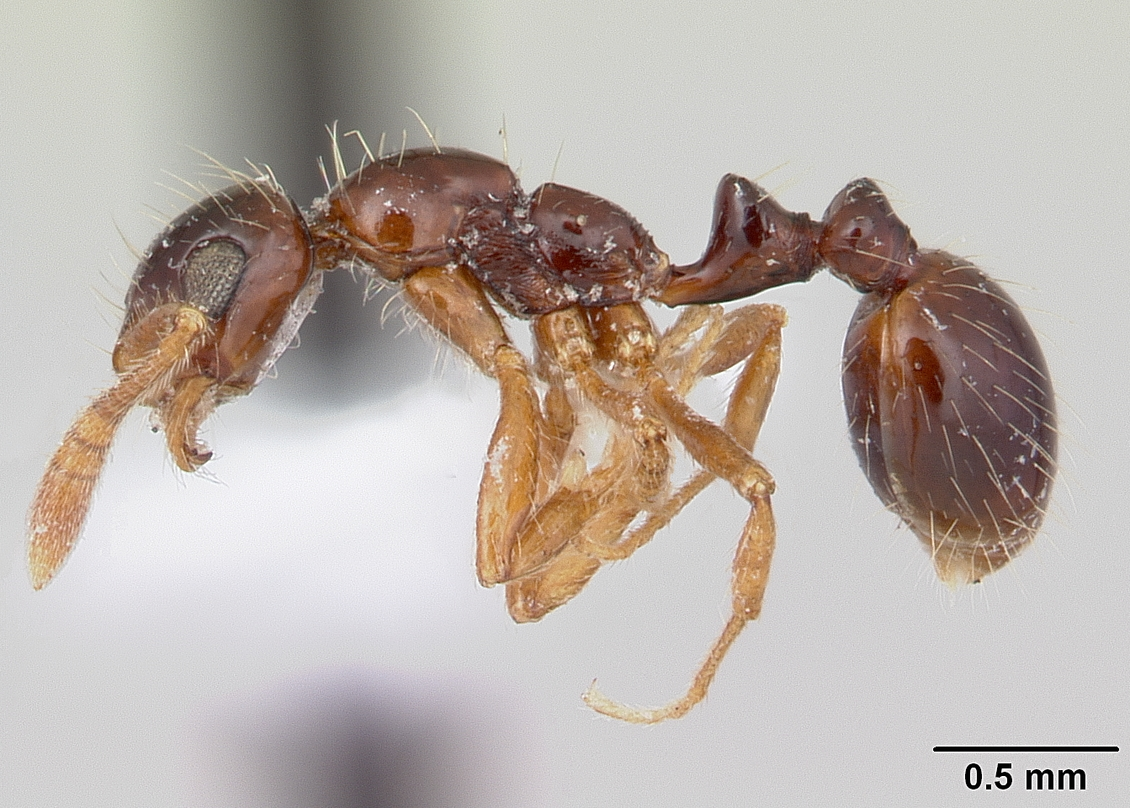
- M. incisus worker from Paraguay

Scientific classification
- Domain: Eukaryota
- Kingdom: Animalia
- Phylum: Arthropoda
- Class: Insecta
- Order: Hymenoptera
- Family: Formicidae
- Subfamily: Myrmicinae
- Genus: Megalomyrmex
- Species: M. incisus

Binomial name
- Megalomyrmex incisus Smith, 1947

= Megalomyrmex incisus =

Species of ant

Megalomyrmex incisus is a Neotropical species of ants in the subfamily Myrmicinae. The species is known from southern Mexico south to central Brazil and Peru.

== Habitat and distribution ==
M. incisus occurs in moist to wet forest habitats, from sea level to 1000 m elevation. It is most often encountered as workers in Winkler samples of sifted leaf litter. Colonies have twice been collected from dead wood on the forest floor.

== Description ==
Material from Central America and Venezuela is very similar in color and mandibular dentition. Workers are solid black, and the basal teeth of the mandible vary in size, the second from the base being much larger than the flanking teeth. As a result the mandible appears falcate rather than triangular. A collection from Colombia is distinctive, with the color lighter red brown and the basal teeth of the mandible of more uniform size. Other size and shape characters, including the highly distinctive petiole, are the same as other M. incisus. M. incisus has a range disjunction. It is moderately abundant in Winkler samples from Guatemala and southern Mexico, occurs in Panama and Venezuela, yet has never been collected in Costa Rica, in spite of extensive survey work there.
