= Sericomyrmex aztecus =

Scientific classification
- Domain: Eukaryota
- Kingdom: Animalia
- Phylum: Arthropoda
- Class: Insecta
- Order: Hymenoptera
- Family: Formicidae
- Subfamily: Myrmicinae
- Genus: Sericomyrmex
- Species: S. aztecus

Binomial name
- Sericomyrmex aztecus Forel, 1885

Species of ant

Sericomyrmex aztecus is a species of ant in the family Formicidae.
