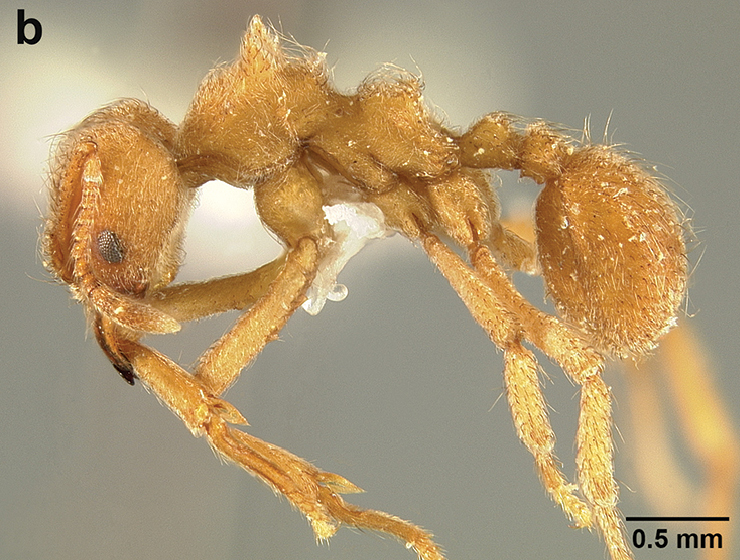

Scientific classification
- Kingdom: Animalia
- Phylum: Arthropoda
- Class: Insecta
- Order: Hymenoptera
- Family: Formicidae
- Subfamily: Myrmicinae
- Tribe: Attini
- Genus: Sericomyrmex
- Species: S. radioheadi

Binomial name
- Sericomyrmex radioheadi Ješovnik & Schultz, 2017

= Sericomyrmex radioheadi =

Species of ant

Sericomyrmex radioheadi is a species of ant in the genus Sericomyrmex. Described by Ana Ješovnik and Ted R. Schultz in 2017, the species is endemic to Venezuelan Amazonia. The species is named after the British rock band Radiohead. Female members of the species have a white, crystal-like layer covering their bodies, but this layer is absent from the males.
