= Megalomyrmex acauna =

Scientific classification
- Domain: Eukaryota
- Kingdom: Animalia
- Phylum: Arthropoda
- Class: Insecta
- Order: Hymenoptera
- Family: Formicidae
- Subfamily: Myrmicinae
- Genus: Megalomyrmex
- Species: M. acauna

Binomial name
- Megalomyrmex acauna Brandão, 1990

Species of ant

Megalomyrmex acauna is a Neotropical species of ants in the subfamily Myrmicinae. Known from Brazil and Peru. It is similar to M. leoninus-group. Its head width (HW) is 1.45—1.63 mm and head length (HL) is 1.68—1.75 mm. Its scapus length (SL) is 2.13—2.28 mm.
