= Megalomyrmex mondaboroides =

Scientific classification
- Domain: Eukaryota
- Kingdom: Animalia
- Phylum: Arthropoda
- Class: Insecta
- Order: Hymenoptera
- Family: Formicidae
- Subfamily: Myrmicinae
- Genus: Megalomyrmex
- Species: M. mondaboroides

Binomial name
- Megalomyrmex mondaboroides Longino, 2010

Species of ant

Megalomyrmex mondaboroides (the name refers to its similarity to M. mondabora) is a Neotropical species of ant in the subfamily Myrmicinae. Megalomyrmex mondaboroides occurs in lowland wet forest habitats in Panama and Costa Rica. Colonies have been collected in the nests of small attines, primarily Cyphomyrmex costatus and Apterostigma goniodes. In Costa Rica a worker was collected in a Winkler sample of sifted leaf litter.

Megalomyrmex mondaboroides and M. mondabora are very similar species, and they were treated as a single variable species in Adams & Longino (2007). There is now evidence that the two forms are sympatric in Costa Rica, and molecular evidence suggests that the two are probably sister taxa.
