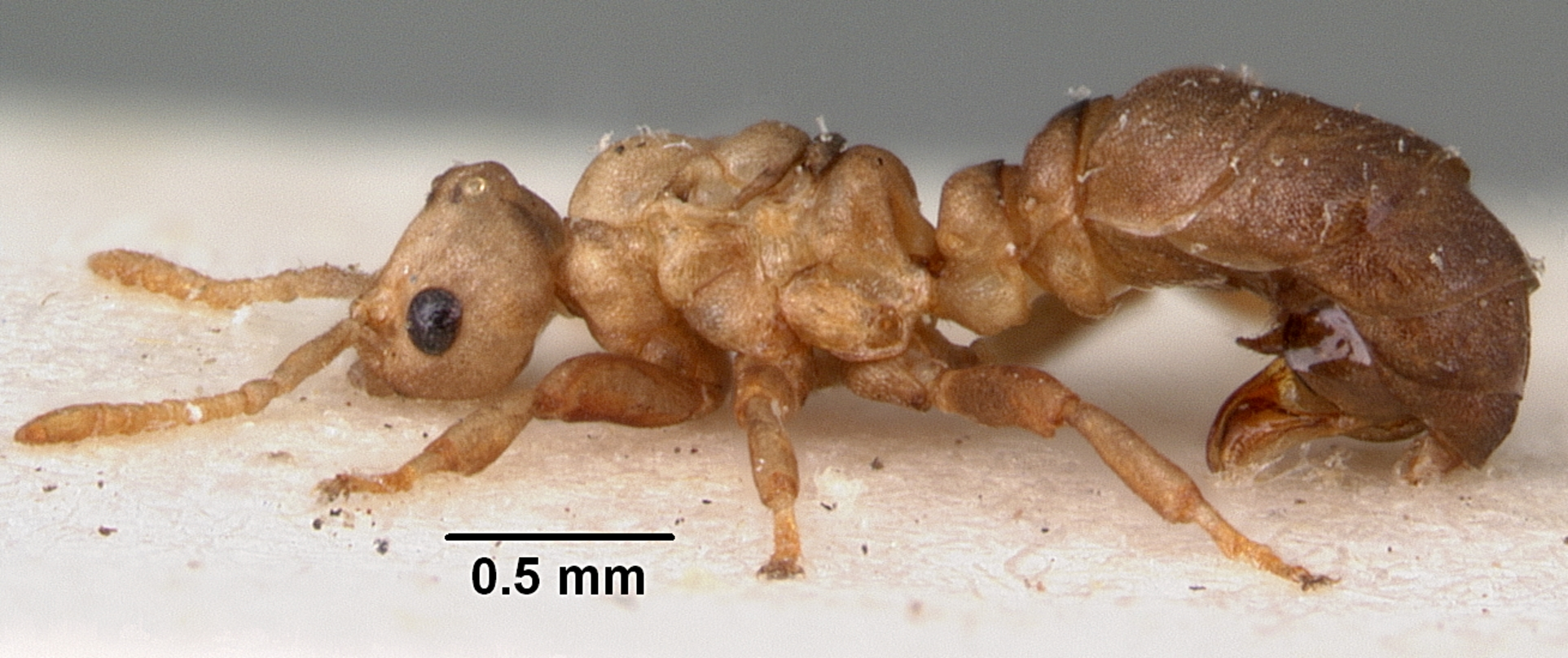
- T. atratulum male

Conservation status
- Vulnerable (IUCN 2.3)

Scientific classification
- Kingdom: Animalia
- Phylum: Arthropoda
- Class: Insecta
- Order: Hymenoptera
- Family: Formicidae
- Subfamily: Myrmicinae
- Genus: Tetramorium
- Species: T. atratulum

Binomial name
- Tetramorium atratulum (Schenck, 1852)

= Tetramorium atratulum =

Species of ant

Tetramorium atratulum is a rare workerless socially parasitic ant from the Palaearctic region, which has even been introduced together with its host in North America. This extreme inquiline is represented only by female and pupoid type male individuals, whose morphology and anatomy indicate a highly specialized level of parasitism. The body of males is depigmentated, the cuticle is thin, the petiole and postpetiole are widely connected, and degenerate mandibles, palps, and antennae are observed. Female wing venation is reduced and the occipital region is narrowed. Mature females are typically physogastric and found in queenless host nests.

Since, unlike many other obligate social parasites, T. atratulum is never known to coexist with the host colony's fertile queen, every T. atratulum–Tetramorium sp. colony is doomed to survive only the lifespan of the youngest Tetramorium sp. workers. Thus, the parasitic queen has very limited scope for producing alates to secure the next generation, as this time span is often only 2–3 years or fewer. As a result, even within its well-established range, T. atratulum is very scarce, with only a tiny proportion of Tetramorium sp. colonies playing host to this parasite.

== Distribution ==
Its distribution is local over Eurosiberia and eastern parts of North America, broadly following that of its hosts. It is present but local in southern parts of Great Britain, having first been discovered in the UK by H. St. J. K. Donisthorpe and W. C. Crawley on July 23, 1912, in the New Forest.

== Hosts ==
Although T. atratulum was reported previously mainly in Tetramorium caespitum and T. impurum nests, and was recently found in a nest of T. immigrans (species within the Tetramorium caespitum/impurum complex), it was also recorded from Sicily (Italy) from a nontypical low altitude (300 m) in a nest of T. diomedeum, which is a member of the Tetramorium ferox complex. Future clarification of the complicated taxonomic composition of the Tetramorium caespitum/impurum complex will probably enlarge the number of known host ant species parasitized by T. atratulum.

The only report about T. chefketi as a host of T. atratulum was given by Schulz & Sanetra (2002) as an amendment of the identified material published by Heinze (1987) from Tavşanlı (Turkey, Kütahya district). Tetramorium moravicum was also mentioned in Sanetra & Buschinger (2000) as a possible host of T. atratulum, but without any additional data and references.
