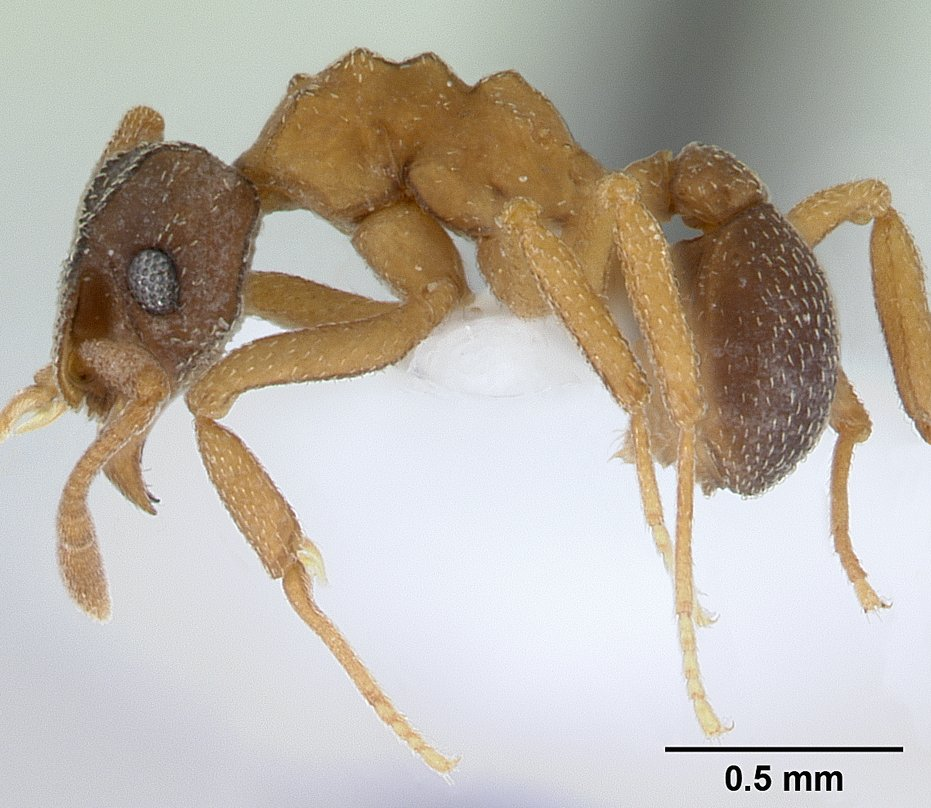
- Cyphomyrmex rimosus worker

Scientific classification
- Kingdom: Animalia
- Phylum: Arthropoda
- Class: Insecta
- Order: Hymenoptera
- Family: Formicidae
- Subfamily: Myrmicinae
- Tribe: Attini
- Genus: Cyphomyrmex; Mayr, 1862

Type species
- Cyphomyrmex minutus

Diversity
- 41 species

= Cyphomyrmex =

Genus of ants

Cyphomyrmex is a genus of fungus-growing ants found primarily in South and Central America. However, some species do come up to the southern portion of North America. They grow a variety of fungi in the tribe Leucocoprineae. Most fungal gardens are grown in small nodules, some species to cultivate entire mycelium, though. Colonies are monogynous and are relatively small with about 100 workers on average.

== Taxonomy ==
This genus is within the subfamily Myrmicinae and the tribe Attini. Cyphomyrmex is a more basal part of this phylogenetic relationship. With more recent phylogenetic studies, more derived genera are placed ahead of this genus, now making it sister to the genus Mycetophylax. The fungi that are grown by attine ants, like Cyphomyrmex, follow similar diversification as their ant cultivators. Also, chemicals used throughout the attine ants are derived from one another. So, those used by Cyphomyrmex provided a base plan for more complex mixtures that are found in higher genera, like Trachymyrmex. This helps to relate attine ants to one another and even separate species as chemical profiles can be particularly unique.

== Description ==
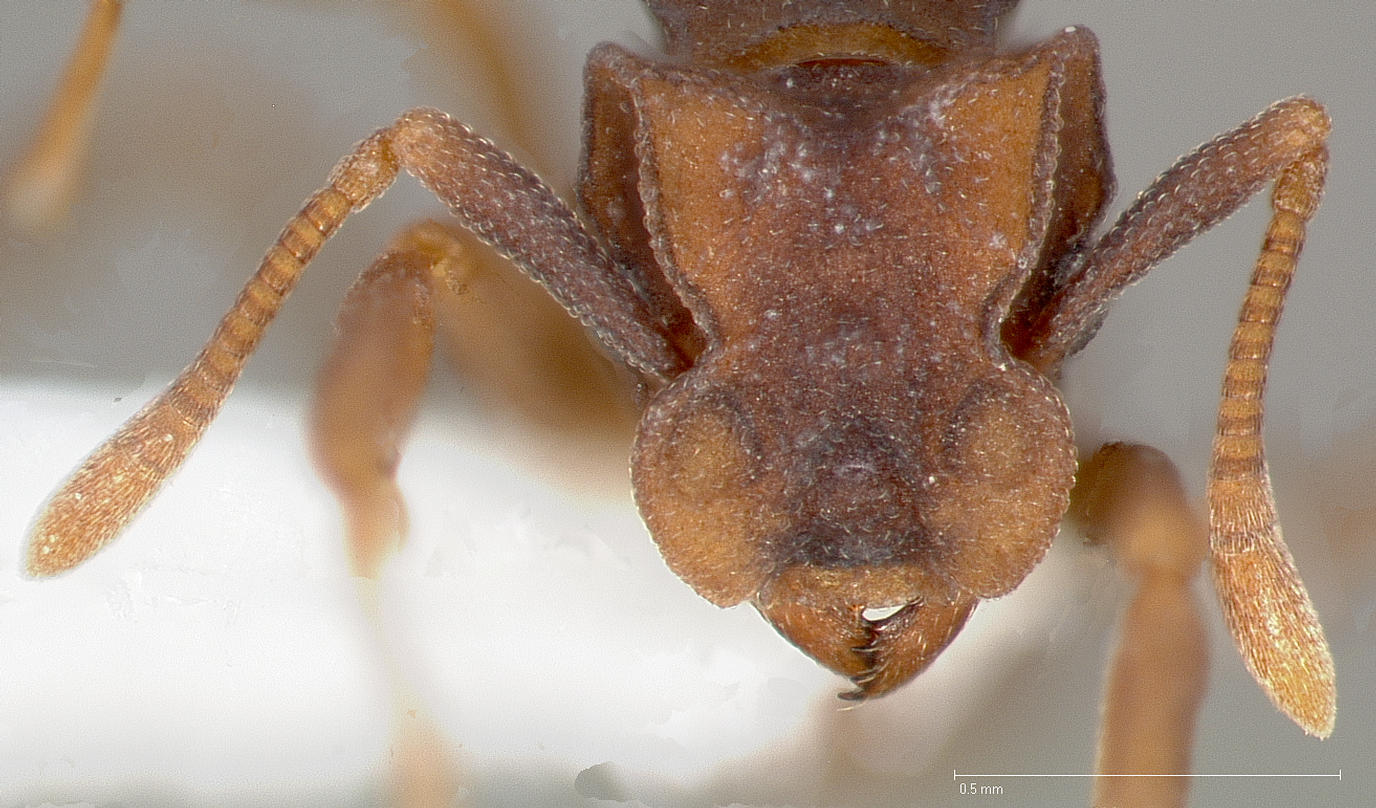
A depiction of how the frontal carinae form a shield in C. flavidus

The frontal carinae on the head form a shield which is quite diagnostic for this genus. On the mesosoma, there are a series of blunt tubercles lining it. This genus is divided into two complexes, the strigatus and rimosus complex. The strigatus complex is limited to South America, while the rimosus complex ranges from southern North America to South America. Species in the rimosus group can be noted by their anteriorly open antennal scrobe and the five teeth on their mandibles. While strigatus has a closed anterior antennal scrobe with six or more teeth on the mandibles.

== Life cycle ==
As with all ants, they undergo complete metamorphosis. Their diet varies throughout development.

=== Larvae ===
They are primarily mycophagous. They are commonly groomed by workers which promotes fungal growth on their integument. This fungal growth can take both the mycelial and yeast form. As larvae develop through multiple instars, they do not differ drastically in their morphology. The main, observable difference is that they become larger and more rotund as they age.

=== Workers ===
As is found across genera, as ant workers age they progressively move out of the colony. Younger workers are primarily nurses, while older ones are foragers. They also assist with ecdysis for the larvae as they molt or emerge from eggs. In Cyphomyrmex, workers are mostly mycophagous, like the larvae. Younger workers do receive sugary substances from older workers through trophallaxis. These older workers have the most diverse diet, consisting of sugary substances derived mostly from plants found from their foraging trips.

=== Queens ===
Founding queens have a low level of fat reserves when compared to other genera. This is because they rely on their fungal gardens to provide these extra nutrients the first generation of workers will need. There is normally a monogynous colony structure within Cyphomyrmex. The queen’s diet is primarily mycophagous, however some sugars are fed to her from the older, foraging workers.

== Behavior ==
The rimosus group is known for their cultivation of nodules of fungus, also called yeast gardens. This type of growth is known for clusters of small patches of fungus on irregularly shaped nodules full of single-celled yeast-like cells. This type of growth is unique in association with Cyphomyrmex ants. So, it is thought of as a form of domestication for Leucocoprineaceous fungi as they naturally grow in the mycelium form.

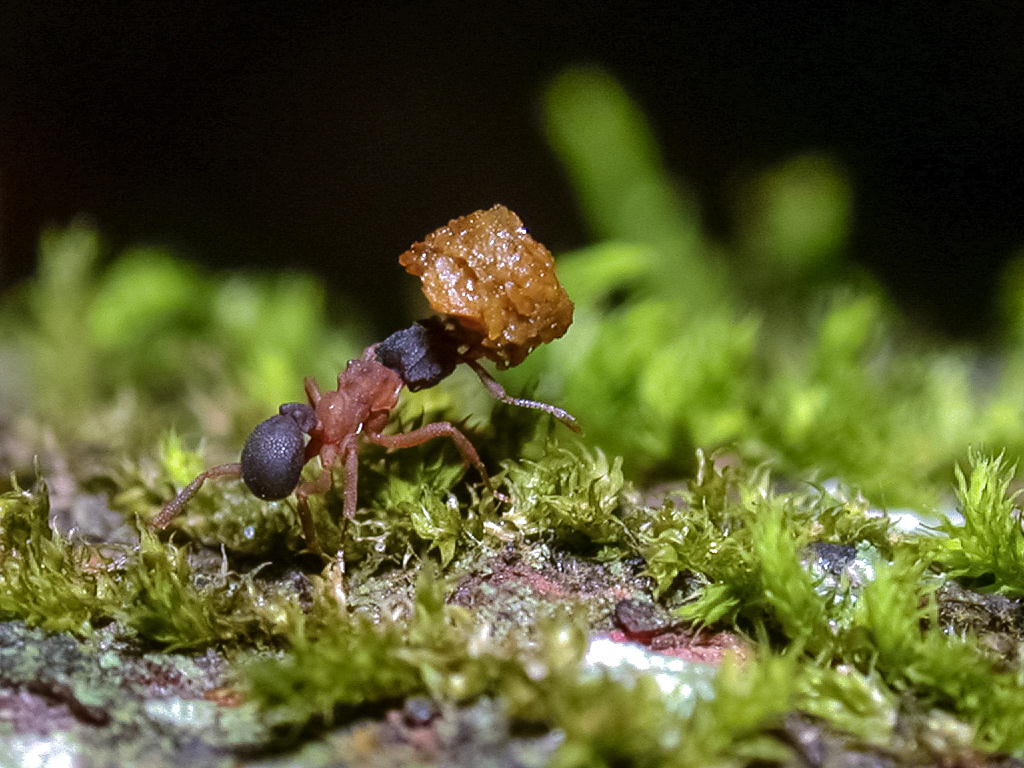
A Cyphomyrmex worker carrying a piece of caterpillar frass.

Workers grow nodules of fungus, in the tribe Leucocoprineae, and they perform this in stages. First, workers will clean a portion of the ground and place insect feces, an old exoskeleton, or another organic item like a leaf. Then a worker will regurgitate fluids from her crop and add anal fluids. She then lets it dry on the surface. Other workers, or the same one, will repeat this process until the ball is about 0.8 mm. At this point, it is transplanted to where other nodules are growing with fungi. This new one is rubbed on established colonies and then placed on the ground, starting a new, small garden. Gardens can also be created hanging from roots on the ceiling of a nest, showing plasticity in the behavior of nest making.

Workers also can have highly aggressive behavior towards unwanted guests. Specialized wasps in the family Diapriidae parasitize larvae and can induce a relatively large mortality rate, with about 16% of all larvae being infected. Any newly emerged wasps found in the brood piles are almost immediately attacked.

== Social chemistry ==
Most Cyphomyrmex species are found to contain 3-octanol. This is thought to act as an alarm signal across species. Traces of nonanal are also found within the genus. Another common chemical group are farnesenes. It contributes to trail following behaviors, and potentially more importantly, influences agriculture practices. Some of the nodule-making species contain low diversity and overall levels of farnesenes. While mycelium growers are found to have a high diversity of this chemical group in their gaster. The presence of farnesenes seems to be unique to Cyphomyrmex among the fungus-growing ants; however, other genera across the family Formicidae also possess it.

Inquilines of Cyphomyrmex can influence the behavior of their hosts. As observed in host associations between C. cornutus and its social parasite Megalomyrmex mondabora, alkaloids in the venom of the parasite cause less aggressive behavior in their host. Sometimes C. cornutus even plays dead when they are stung or in contact with their parasite, showing that the venom has evolved to not be extremely toxic to them and simply manipulate social behavior.

The fungi that the ants interact with can also produce important chemicals. Some fungal gardens can produce diketopiperazines, which has antifungal abilities. This is through to either protect the fungi or the ants from other potentially harmful species. Diketopiperazines are thought to possess some antibacterial and antiviral abilities too.

== Habitat ==
Common nest sites for species can range from in the soil, under rotting logs, within hollow and dead twigs. Some species have specialized nesting habits, such as C. longiscapus. They create swallow nest-like structures that hang underneath overhangs. It is made of soil or clay. The main entrance leads directly to their fungal garden, which should leave them susceptible to desiccation; but they only live in moist habitats so their gardens remain wet. Some inhabit arid environments while others are in wetter conditions, like C. longiscapus. Another species, C. transversus, was observed nesting inside and around dry coconuts. Therefore, a variety of species can found colonies in a wide range of habitats and ecosystems.

== Distribution ==
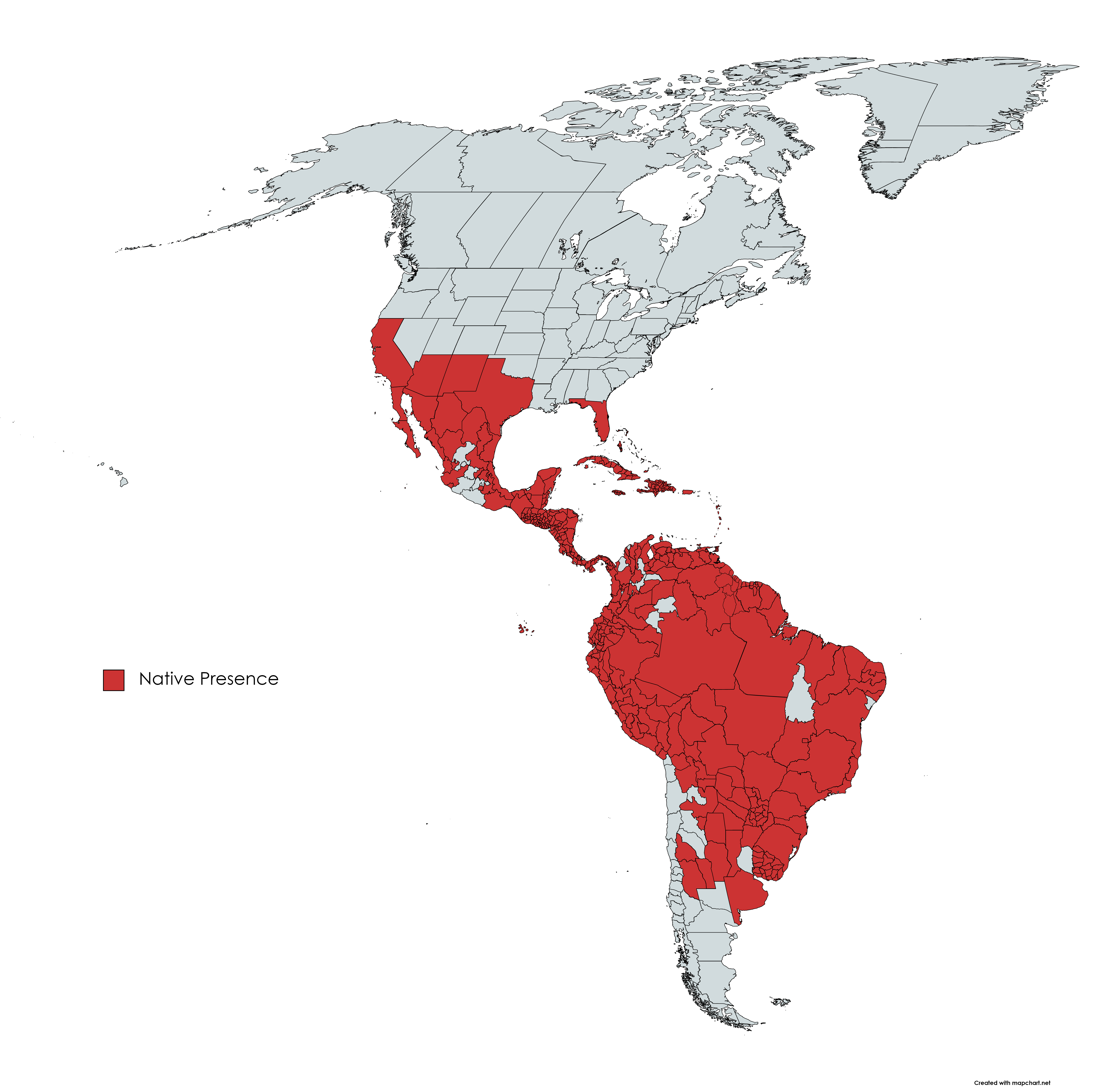
Native distribution of Cyphomyrmex

They range from Central South America, reaching as south as Argentina. They also reach up into North America, stretching from Texas up to California and even east to Florida.

== Species ==
- Cyphomyrmex andersoni Mackay & Serna, 2010
- Cyphomyrmex auritus Mayr, 1887
- Cyphomyrmex bicarinatus Snelling & Longino, 1992
- Cyphomyrmex bicornis Forel, 1896
- Cyphomyrmex bigibbosus Emery, 1894
- Cyphomyrmex bruchi Santschi, 1917
- Cyphomyrmex castagnei MacKay & Baena, 1993
- Cyphomyrmex cornutus Kempf, 1968
- Cyphomyrmex costatus Mann, 1922
- Cyphomyrmex daguerrei Santschi, 1933
- Cyphomyrmex dixus Snelling & Longino, 1992
- Cyphomyrmex faunulus Wheeler, 1925
- Cyphomyrmex flavidus Pergande, 1896
- Cyphomyrmex foxi Andre, 1892
- Cyphomyrmex hamulatus Weber, 1938
- Cyphomyrmex kirbyi Mayr, 1887
- Cyphomyrmex laevigatus Weber, 1938
- Cyphomyrmex lectus (Forel, 1911)
- Cyphomyrmex lilloanus Kusnezov, 1949
- Cyphomyrmex longiscapus Weber, 1940
- Cyphomyrmex major Forel, 1901
- Cyphomyrmex minutus Mayr, 1862
- Cyphomyrmex morschi Emery, 1888
- Cyphomyrmex nemei Kusnezov, 1957
- Cyphomyrmex nesiotus Snelling & Longino, 1992
- Cyphomyrmex occultus Kempf, 1964
- Cyphomyrmex olitor Forel, 1893
- Cyphomyrmex paniscus Wheeler, 1925
- Cyphomyrmex peltatus Kempf, 1966
- Cyphomyrmex plaumanni Kempf, 1962
- Cyphomyrmex podargus Snelling & Longino, 1992
- Cyphomyrmex rimosus (Spinola, 1851)
- Cyphomyrmex salvini Forel, 1899
- Cyphomyrmex strigatus Mayr, 1887
- Cyphomyrmex transversus Emery, 1894
- Cyphomyrmex vallensis Kusnezov, 1949
- Cyphomyrmex vorticis Weber, 1940
- Cyphomyrmex wheeleri Forel, 1900
