= Sericomyrmex burchelli =

Scientific classification
- Domain: Eukaryota
- Kingdom: Animalia
- Phylum: Arthropoda
- Class: Insecta
- Order: Hymenoptera
- Family: Formicidae
- Subfamily: Myrmicinae
- Tribe: Attini
- Genus: Sericomyrmex
- Species: S. burchelli

Binomial name
- Sericomyrmex burchelli Forel, 1905

Species of ant

Sericomyrmex burchelli is a species of ant in the family Formicidae. Insects belonging to the Sericomyrmex genus are light yellow to deep ferrugineous brown in color and covered with long, flexible hairs, making them appear silky and velvety to the naked eye. In Latin, "sericeus" means "silky".
