= Sericomyrmex harekulli =

Scientific classification
- Domain: Eukaryota
- Kingdom: Animalia
- Phylum: Arthropoda
- Class: Insecta
- Order: Hymenoptera
- Family: Formicidae
- Subfamily: Myrmicinae
- Tribe: Attini
- Genus: Sericomyrmex
- Species: S. harekulli

Binomial name
- Sericomyrmex harekulli Weber, 1937

Species of ant

Sericomyrmex harekulli is a species of ant in the family Formicidae.
