= Megalomyrmex reina =

Scientific classification
- Domain: Eukaryota
- Kingdom: Animalia
- Phylum: Arthropoda
- Class: Insecta
- Order: Hymenoptera
- Family: Formicidae
- Subfamily: Myrmicinae
- Genus: Megalomyrmex
- Species: M. reina

Binomial name
- Megalomyrmex reina Longino, 2010

Species of ant

Megalomyrmex reina is a Neotropical species of ants in the subfamily Myrmicinae. Described in 2010, this species is known only from queens from Costa Rica. The fact that it is known only from queens is reflected in the name (from Spanish, reina, meaning queen).

Both queens were collected in the same locality, in mature montane wet forest. The holotype queen was in a Winkler sample of sifted leaf litter. The paratype queen was collected as a forager on the ground. The foraging queen had rapid wasp-like behavior, with rapidly vibrating antennae. The lack of associated workers, in spite of abundant collecting (including many Winkler samples) at the type locality, raises the possibility that this species is a workerless social parasite. Alternatively, workers may be subterranean associates of attines and thus not accessible to standard collection techniques. The mandibular dentition of reina is highly distinctive and unlike any other Megalomyrmex species. In other species the dentition varies from a condition of few teeth that gradually decrease in size basally to one in which the two apical teeth are much larger than a series of diminished basal denticles. In contrast, M. reina has a single large apical tooth, which is long and sharp, followed by a relatively uniform series of smaller teeth. The size difference between the apical and subapical tooth is much greater than in other species. Many socially parasitic ant species have falcate mandibles associated with their ability to attack and subdue hosts. Perhaps the long apical tooth of M. reina is such an adaptation, strengthening the conjecture that it may be a social parasite.
