= Megalomyrmex modestus =

Scientific classification
- Domain: Eukaryota
- Kingdom: Animalia
- Phylum: Arthropoda
- Class: Insecta
- Order: Hymenoptera
- Family: Formicidae
- Subfamily: Myrmicinae
- Genus: Megalomyrmex
- Species: M. modestus

Binomial name
- Megalomyrmex modestus Emery, 1896

Species of ant

Megalomyrmex modestus is a Neotropical species of ants in the subfamily Myrmicinae, known from Costa Rica, Panama, Colombia, Venezuela.

In Costa Rica, M. modestus is found in mature wet forest of the Atlantic slope. Although it occurs at sea level, it is most abundant at middle elevations, 500–800 m. Nests are subterranean and very large. From these nests, inconspicuous covered galleries extend large distances up trees and under liana stems, and workers may be found under epiphyte mats in the canopy. Workers tend Coccoidea under the shelters. Workers are occasionally collected at baits on the forest floor, but in general they are not often seen as exposed foragers.
