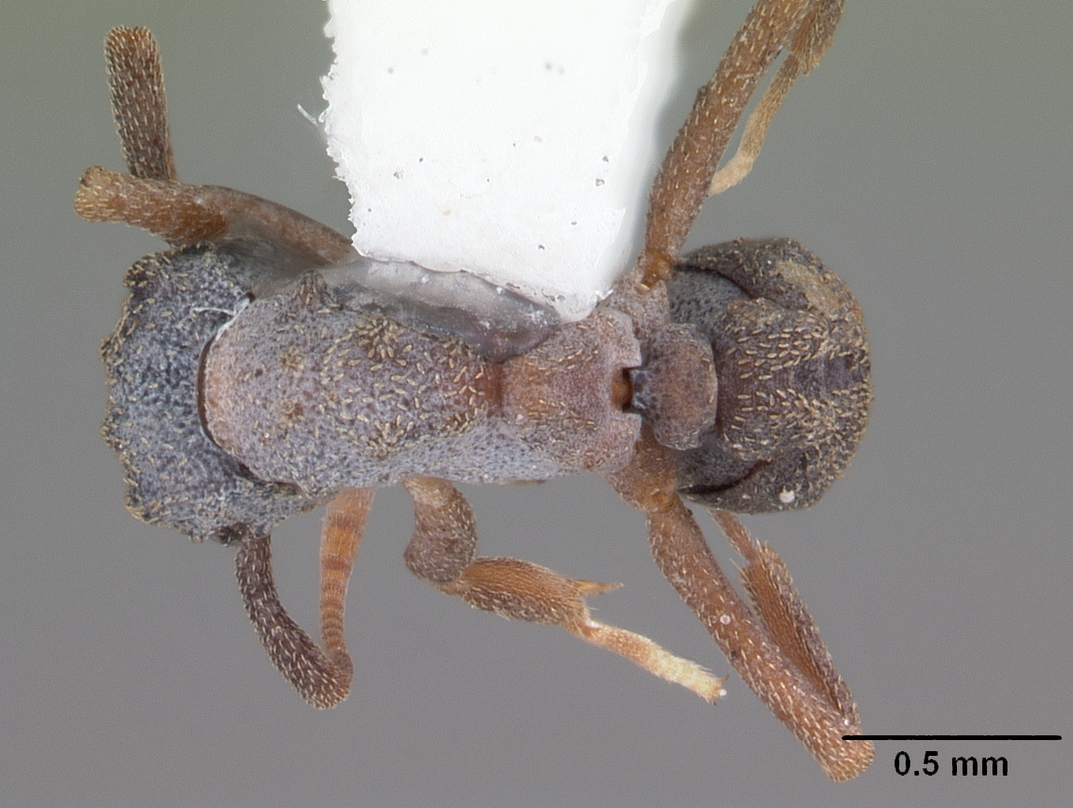

Scientific classification
- Domain: Eukaryota
- Kingdom: Animalia
- Phylum: Arthropoda
- Class: Insecta
- Order: Hymenoptera
- Family: Formicidae
- Subfamily: Myrmicinae
- Genus: Cyphomyrmex
- Species: C. rimosus

Binomial name
- Cyphomyrmex rimosus (Spinola, 1851)

= Cyphomyrmex rimosus =

Species of ant

Cyphomyrmex rimosus is a species of higher myrmicine in the family Formicidae. It is part of the tribe Attini, or fungus-growing ants.

== Subspecies ==
These two subspecies belong to the species Cyphomyrmex rimosus:

- Cyphomyrmex rimosus rimosus^{g}
- Cyphomyrmex rimosus salvini^{g}

Data sources: i = ITIS, c = Catalogue of Life, g = GBIF, b = Bugguide.net
