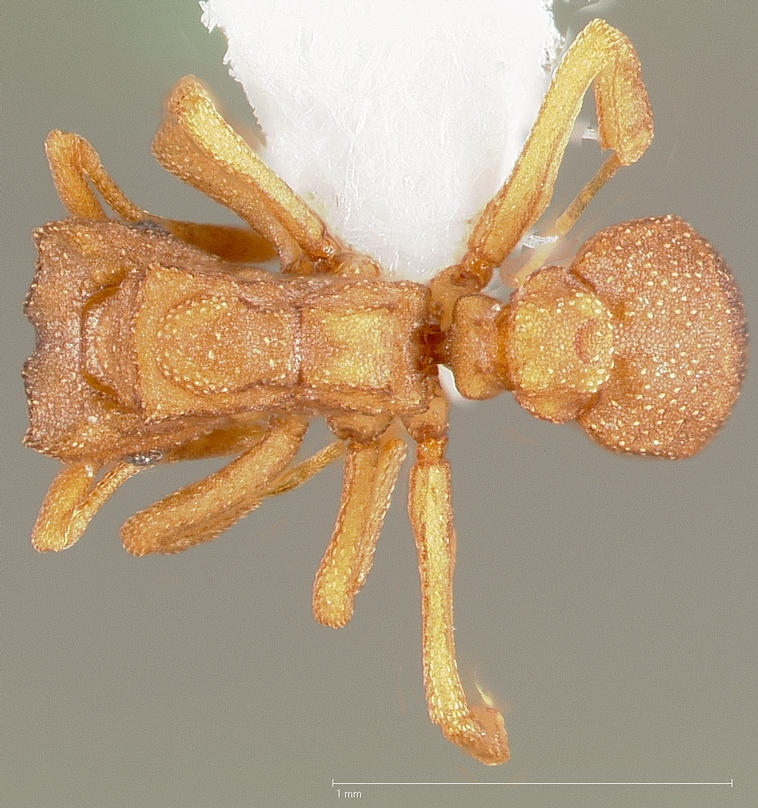

Scientific classification
- Domain: Eukaryota
- Kingdom: Animalia
- Phylum: Arthropoda
- Class: Insecta
- Order: Hymenoptera
- Family: Formicidae
- Subfamily: Myrmicinae
- Tribe: Attini
- Genus: Cyphomyrmex
- Species: C. wheeleri

Binomial name
- Cyphomyrmex wheeleri Forel, 1900

= Cyphomyrmex wheeleri =

Species of ant

Cyphomyrmex wheeleri, the fungus gardening ant, is a species of higher myrmicine in the family Formicidae. As the common name suggests, this species grows a diversity of fungi, including year-round cultivation of Cladosporium cladosporioides, Fusarium solani, and Nigrospora sphaerica.

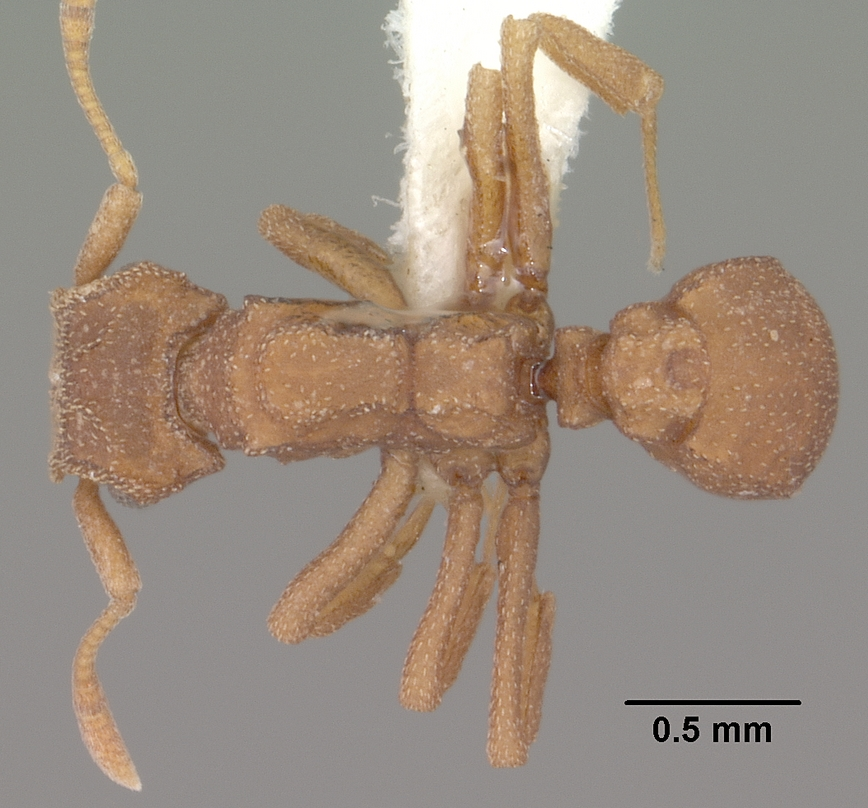
Fungus gardening ant, Cyphomyrmex wheeleri
