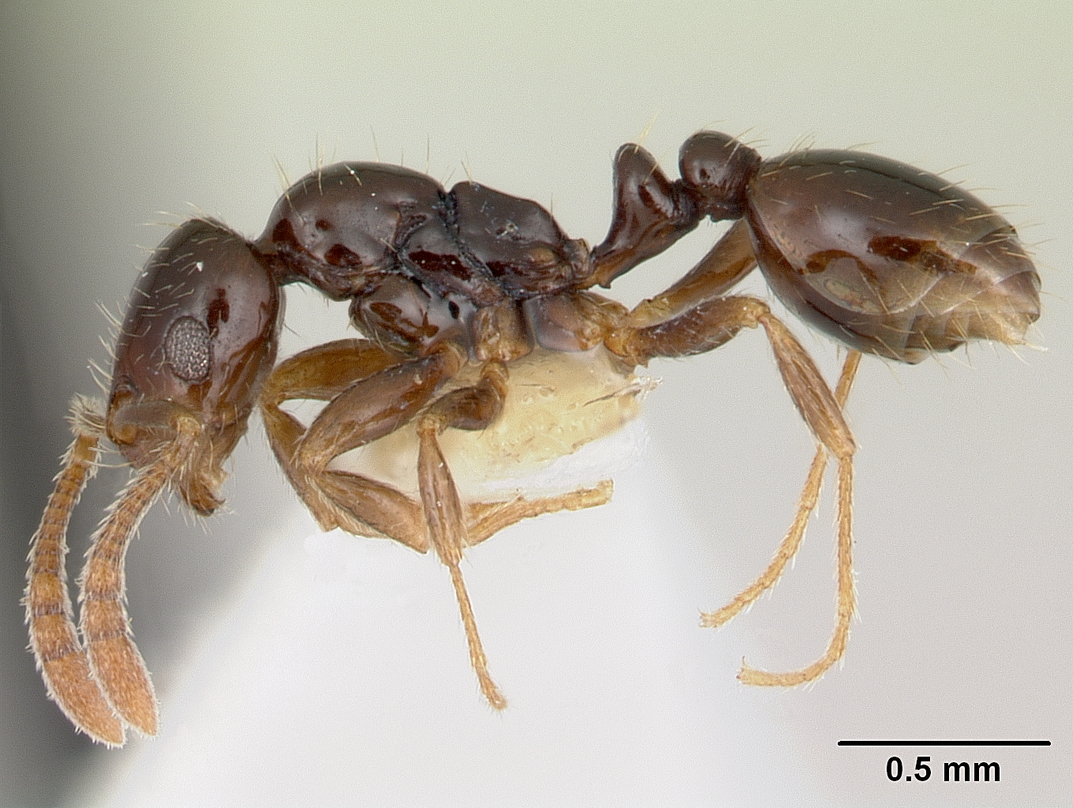
- M. drifti worker from Paraguay

Scientific classification
- Domain: Eukaryota
- Kingdom: Animalia
- Phylum: Arthropoda
- Class: Insecta
- Order: Hymenoptera
- Family: Formicidae
- Subfamily: Myrmicinae
- Genus: Megalomyrmex
- Species: M. drifti

Binomial name
- Megalomyrmex drifti Kempf, 1961

= Megalomyrmex drifti =

Species of ant

Megalomyrmex drifti is a Neotropical species of ants in the subfamily Myrmicinae. The species is widespread in tropical South America, north through Central America to southern Mexico.

M. drifti occurs in moist to wet forest habitats, in mature and second growth forest. Most collections are from below 600 m elevation, but collections from 1500 m cloud forest are known. Workers and occasionally queens are moderately abundant in Winkler samples of sifted litter.
