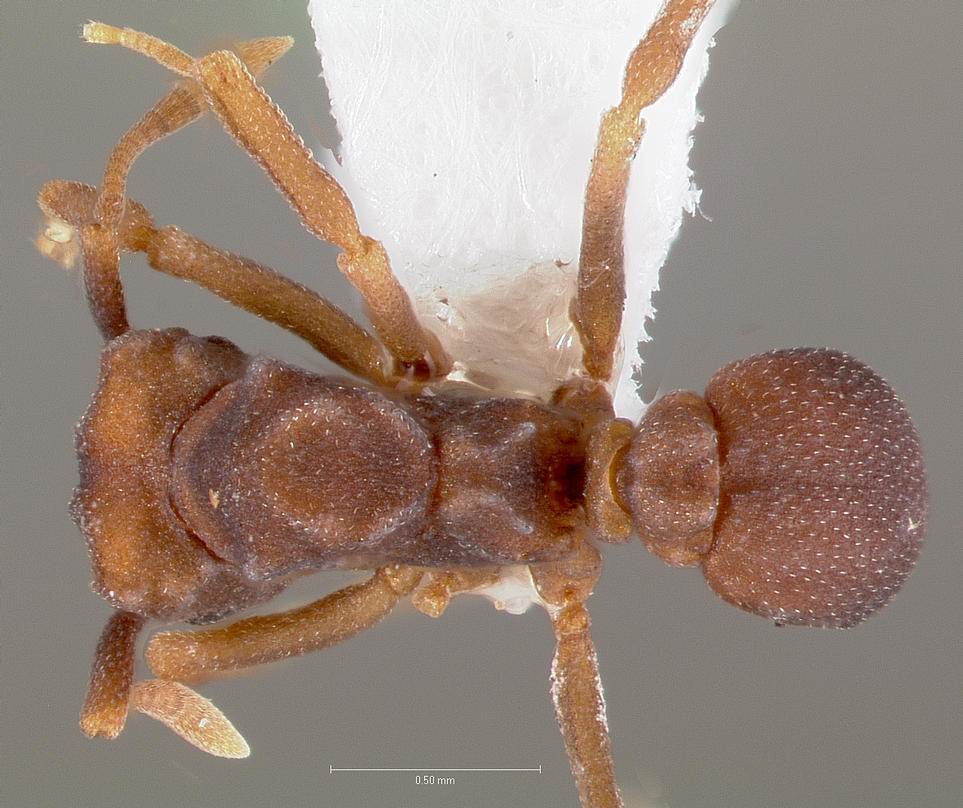

Scientific classification
- Domain: Eukaryota
- Kingdom: Animalia
- Phylum: Arthropoda
- Class: Insecta
- Order: Hymenoptera
- Family: Formicidae
- Subfamily: Myrmicinae
- Tribe: Attini
- Genus: Cyphomyrmex
- Species: C. flavidus

Binomial name
- Cyphomyrmex flavidus Pergande, 1896

= Cyphomyrmex flavidus =

Species of ant

Cyphomyrmex flavidus is a species of higher myrmicine in the family Formicidae.
