= Megalomyrmex wallacei =

Scientific classification
- Domain: Eukaryota
- Kingdom: Animalia
- Phylum: Arthropoda
- Class: Insecta
- Order: Hymenoptera
- Family: Formicidae
- Subfamily: Myrmicinae
- Genus: Megalomyrmex
- Species: M. wallacei

Binomial name
- Megalomyrmex wallacei Mann, 1916

Species of ant

Megalomyrmex wallacei is a Neotropical species of ants in the subfamily Myrmicinae. Megalomyrmex wallacei can be found in Brazil (Amazonas, Rondônia, Pará, Tocantins), Guyana, Colombia, Costa Rica. This species occurs in mature wet forest, usually low-elevation rainforest. Brandão (2003) reports the species nesting under leaves on the forest floor, in colonies of up to 300 workers.
