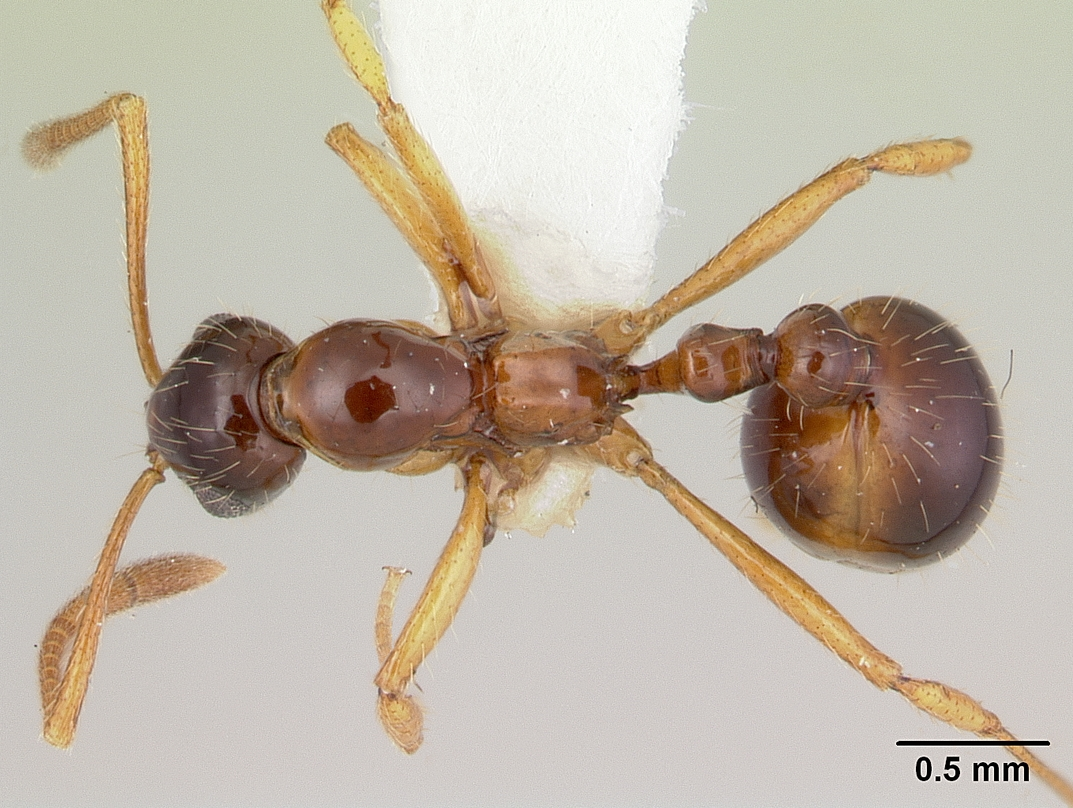
- M. silvestrii worker from Paraguay

Scientific classification
- Domain: Eukaryota
- Kingdom: Animalia
- Phylum: Arthropoda
- Class: Insecta
- Order: Hymenoptera
- Family: Formicidae
- Subfamily: Myrmicinae
- Genus: Megalomyrmex
- Species: M. silvestrii

Binomial name
- Megalomyrmex silvestrii Wheeler, 1909

Synonyms
- Megalomyrmex brasiliensis Borgmeier, 1930; Megalomyrmex langi Wheeler, 1925; Megalomyrmex misionensis Santschi, 1936; Megalomyrmex sjostedti Wheeler, 1925; Megalomyrmex wheeleri Weber, 1940

= Megalomyrmex silvestrii =

Species of ant

Megalomyrmex silvestrii is a Neotropical species of ants in the subfamily Myrmicinae. Megalomyrmex silvestrii is widespread in the mainland Neotropics from Mexico to northern Argentina. This species occurs in moist to wet forest habitats, from sea level to 1100 m elevation. It nests in small chambers in rotten wood or opportunistically in other small cavities in the soil. Colonies have been found in small attine nests and alone, suggesting it is a facultative predator of small Attini.

Kempf and Brown (1968) suggested that the species is "not so much a parasite as it is a mass-foraging predator that specializes in raiding, and sometimes occupying, the nests of small Attini." Workers are moderately abundant in Winkler samples of forest floor litter, and workers may visit baits on the forest floor.
