= Megalomyrmex symmetochus =

Conservation status
- Vulnerable (IUCN 2.3)

Scientific classification
- Kingdom: Animalia
- Phylum: Arthropoda
- Class: Insecta
- Order: Hymenoptera
- Family: Formicidae
- Subfamily: Myrmicinae
- Genus: Megalomyrmex
- Species: M. symmetochus

Binomial name
- Megalomyrmex symmetochus Wheeler, 1925

Species of ant

Megalomyrmex symmetochus is a species of ant in the subfamily Myrmicinae. It is native to Panama. This ant is also known as the parasitic guest ant.

M. symmetochus was discovered by William M. Wheeler in late July 1924 in the fungus gardens of the attine Sericomyrmex amabilis of Barro Colorado Island.

== Description ==
head of worker and male, thorax + pedicel of worker, forewing of female

Workers are 3 to 3.5 mm long, with small, feebly convex eyes, that are probably adapted to living within the dark fungal gardens of their host. Very small ocelli are only sometimes present. Workers are yellowish red, with mandibles, funiculi, the posterior half of the first segment of the gaster and the sutures of the thorax and pedicels brown. The tip of the gaster is yellowish.

The female is almost 4 mm long. She has larger eyes than the workers and distinct ocelli. Otherwise, they look very similar to workers. Each ocellus has a black margin internally. The wings are yellowish hyaline and iridescent, with veins and pterostigma pale yellow. The membranes of the wings are distinctly pubescent.

Males are almost 3 mm long. They bear very large eyes and ocelli. Their body form is very similar to that of workers and females, but with smooth sides of the thorax. The wings have longer pubescence that in the female. Males are brownish yellow, with a little darker gaster and slightly paler antennae and legs. The eyes and a spot along the inner border of each ocellus are black.

== Behavior ==
M. Symmetochus often live among and take from the gardens of fungus-growing ants, sometimes usurping the gardens. In some populations they coexist with fungus-growing hosts >80% of the time. They number their hosts as much as 1:3. Young queens stealthily invade fungus-growing colonies and start their own lineage in the fungus garden. Then, they clip the wings of the hosts' virgin queens, but not the males.

When their hosts live near predators who destroy the nests and destroy their gardens, M. Symmetochus serves as protection of their host colonies. Hundreds of worker ants live throughout the nest of the host, and when invaders attack, individuals recruit the others inside to defend the nest. Also, these ants have been observed projecting their stings, leaving two isomers of 3-butyl-5-hexylpyrrolizidine, marking the nest with the scent of its toxin. It seems that some species avoid nests with their marked scent. When there are no invaders, M. Symmetochus commonly have aggressive conflict with their hosts. Therefore, it seems that when M. Symmetochus lives with a host with no outside danger, they serve as parasites, but when the hosts live near other threats, they have a mutualistic relationship with their hosts.
