= Megalomyrmex wettereri =

Scientific classification
- Domain: Eukaryota
- Kingdom: Animalia
- Phylum: Arthropoda
- Class: Insecta
- Order: Hymenoptera
- Family: Formicidae
- Subfamily: Myrmicinae
- Genus: Megalomyrmex
- Species: M. wettereri

Binomial name
- Megalomyrmex wettereri Brandão, 2003

Species of ant

Megalomyrmex wettereri is a Neotropical species of ants in the subfamily Myrmicinae. Megalomyrmex wettereri is known from two lowland rainforest sites: Barro Colorado Island in Panama and La Selva Biological Station in Costa Rica.

== Nest usurpation ==
Observations from Barro Colorado were the subject of Adams et al. (2000). Colonies of M. wettereri were found occupying abandoned nests of Cyphomyrmex longiscapus. The fungus gardens of the Cyphomyrmex were intact and the Megalomyrmex workers were observed feeding on the fungal symbiont. When lab colonies of M. wettereri were placed in contact with colonies of Cyphomyrmex longiscapus, the M. wettereri aggressively attacked, killing the adult workers. When presented with Cyphomyrmex larvae, they stripped them of their fungal coating and fed them to their own larvae. Adams et al. (2000) concluded that M. wettereri was an "agro-predator," raiding Cyphomyrmex colonies en masse, displacing the Cyphomyrmex workers, and feeding on the remaining brood and fungi.
