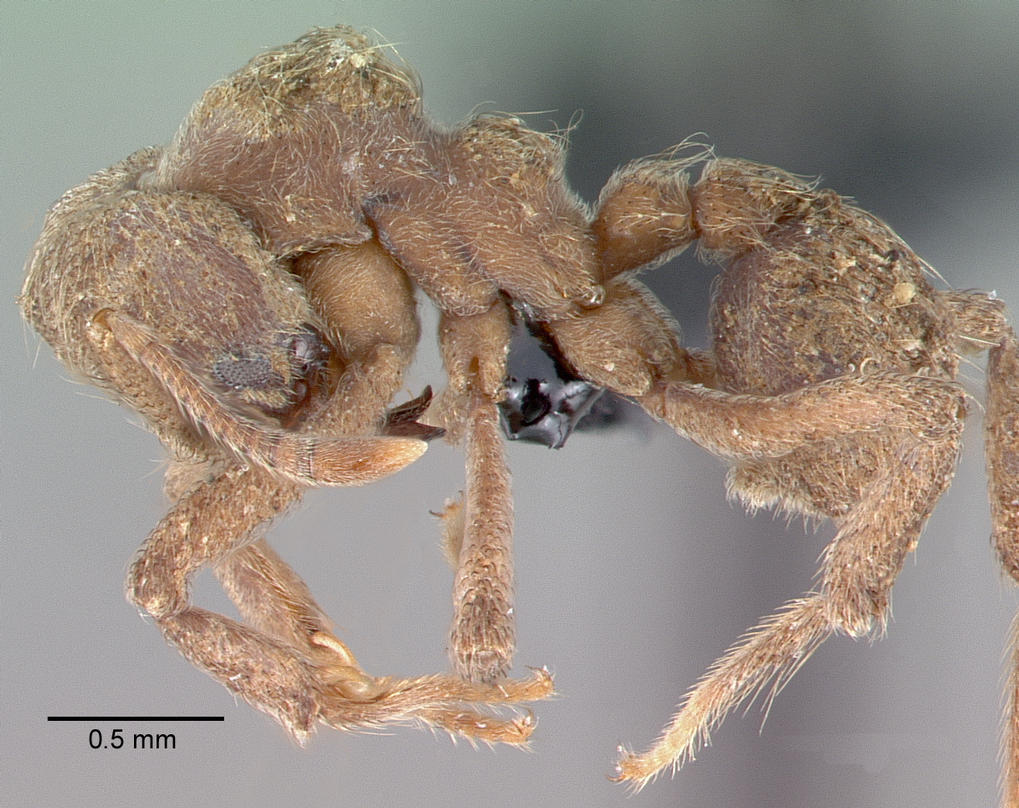
- Sericomyrmex amabilis

Scientific classification
- Domain: Eukaryota
- Kingdom: Animalia
- Phylum: Arthropoda
- Class: Insecta
- Order: Hymenoptera
- Family: Formicidae
- Subfamily: Myrmicinae
- Tribe: Attini
- Genus: Sericomyrmex; Mayr, 1865

Diversity
- 22 species

= Sericomyrmex =

Genus of ants

Sericomyrmex is a genus of fungus-growing ants in the subfamily Myrmicinae.

== Description ==
Workers are up to 4 mm long. They are more diurnal than other fungus growers, but also work a little at night. Winged forms were found during July.

== Habitat ==
In young colonies this leads to a small chamber about 15 cm below, which is situated to the right or left of a gallery. When the colony increases new chambers are formed by piercing through the first. Colonies do not exceed 200 individuals, and a nest thus consists of up to three fungus-growing chambers opening into the first one, which is then used as an antechamber, where material brought in by workers is deposited prior to bringing it into the growth chambers, which are about 6 cm in diameter. Small roots growing into them are not cut away but used to hang the gardens on, which resemble a coarse grey sponge.

Scattered throughout this mass are adults, pupae and larvae. White bodies of about .25 mm are strewn thickly upon the surface of the garden, which consist of an aggregation of hyphae with spherical swellings at the end. These bodies, called "Kohlrabi" clumps by Möller, are used for food by the ants. When held in artificial nests, they preferred fruits, especially oranges over other matter like flowers, leaves, and even the organic glue from the back of an old book, which they will all put to use. Of the oranges they take very small particles of the white skin.

== Behavior ==
The queens appear to mate with only one male during their nuptial flights.

== Example species ==
The nests of S. urichi are most often found in the grass, and can be easily recognized by their peculiar raised entrance. They are always excavated in soil rich in clay, and the cylindrical entrances raise almost 3 cm above the surface.

S. diego from Colombia was found to build a fungus garden about 20 cm below the surface. Workers feign death when encountered. They collect little green vegetable particles resembling an alga, on which they grow their fungus.

S. zacapanus was first found on the clay banks of a small irrigation ditch in an orchard at Zacapa, Guatemala. The nests had small craters of about 6 cm diameter and were covered with the ejected fragments of old fungus substrate.

S. impexus was found in a sandy area at Kartabo, Guyana, to which S. amabilis from Panama is very closely related.

== Species ==
- Sericomyrmex amabilis Wheeler, 1925
- Sericomyrmex aztecus Forel, 1885
- Sericomyrmex beniensis Weber, 1938
- Sericomyrmex bondari Borgmeier, 1937
- Sericomyrmex burchelli Forel, 1905
- Sericomyrmex diego Forel, 1912 — Colombia
- Sericomyrmex harekulli Weber, 1937
- Sericomyrmex impexus Wheeler, 1925 — Guyana
- Sericomyrmex luederwaldti Santschi, 1925
- Sericomyrmex lutzi Wheeler, 1916
- Sericomyrmex maravalhas Ješovnik & Schultz, 2017
- Sericomyrmex mayri Forel, 1912
- Sericomyrmex moreirai Santschi, 1925
- Sericomyrmex myersi Weber, 1937
- Sericomyrmex opacus Mayr, 1865
- Sericomyrmex parvulus Forel, 1912
- Sericomyrmex radioheadi Ješovnik & Schultz, 2017 — Venezuela
- Sericomyrmex saramama Ješovnik & Schultz, 2017
- Sericomyrmex saussurei Emery, 1894
- Sericomyrmex scrobifer Forel, 1911
- Sericomyrmex urichi Forel, 1912
- Sericomyrmex zacapanus Wheeler, 1925 — Guatemala
