= Megalomyrmex foreli =

Scientific classification
- Kingdom: Animalia
- Phylum: Arthropoda
- Clade: Pancrustacea
- Class: Insecta
- Order: Hymenoptera
- Family: Formicidae
- Subfamily: Myrmicinae
- Genus: Megalomyrmex
- Species: M. foreli

Binomial name
- Megalomyrmex foreli Emery, 1890

Synonyms
- Megalomyrmex latreillei Emery, 1890

Species of ant

Megalomyrmex foreli (named after Auguste Forel) is a Neotropical species of ants in the subfamily Myrmicinae.

== Habitat and distribution ==
The species is known from Costa Rica south to Andean regions of Colombia, Ecuador, and northern Peru. M. foreli occurs in moist to wet forest habitats, in mature and second growth forest. It typically occurs in mountainous regions; in Costa Rica collections are from 100 to 1200 m elevation. Workers are large, conspicuous ants that may be found foraging on the ground or on low vegetation. They are attracted to extrafloral nectaries and will tend Hemiptera for honeydew.

In Central America, M. foreli is known from Costa Rica, where it is not common. Workers can be found on the ground and low vegetation as diurnal or nocturnal foragers.
