= Megalomyrmex =

- M. symmetochus

Scientific classification
- Kingdom: Animalia
- Phylum: Arthropoda
- Clade: Pancrustacea
- Class: Insecta
- Order: Hymenoptera
- Family: Formicidae
- Subfamily: Myrmicinae
- Tribe: Solenopsidini
- Genus: Megalomyrmex; Forel, 1885

Type species
- Megalomyrmex leoninus

Diversity
- 44 species

Synonyms
- Cepobroticus Wheeler, 1925; Wheelerimyrmex Mann, 1922

Genus of ants

Megalomyrmex is a genus of ant in the subfamily Myrmicinae. The genus is known only from the Neotropics, where some of the species are specialized parasites or predators of Attini.

== Description ==
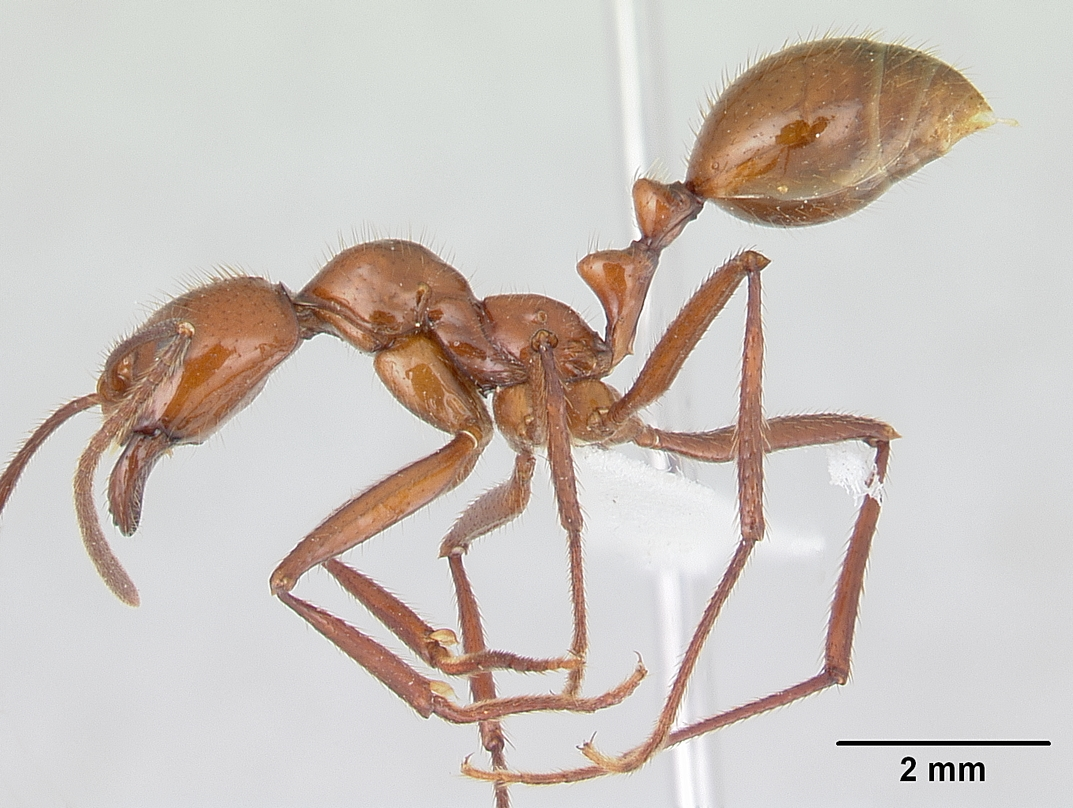
M. leoninus antweb.org specimen

It is difficult to characterize morphologically. Bolton (2003) placed it in the tribe Solenopsidini, but with multiple exceptions to the diagnostic characters for the tribe. The tribal characters include a bicarinate clypeus and a median clypeal seta. Most Megalomyrmex species have a smoothly convex clypeus with no trace of the bicarinate condition, and most have abundant clypeal setae with no distinct or differentiated median seta. In Bolton's (1994) key to genera, Megalomyrmex keys in multiple places because of variability in mandibular dentition. Nevertheless, the genus has a distinctive habitus: the antenna is 12-segmented with a 3-segmented club; the general integument is smooth and shiny without coarse sculpture or dull areas; the promesonotum is evenly arched, without promesonotal groove; the propodeum is usually smoothly curved between dorsal and posterior faces, at most with blunt, broad-based tubercles, and never with spines; and the hind tibial spur is simple. In short, the workers look like a Solenopsis with Pheidole antennae. The mandibular dentition varies from a simple set of 5 similar teeth on the masticatory margin, gradually diminishing in size basally, to a condition with 2 large apical teeth followed by up to 12 small denticles.

Some species have unusual alkaloids. The hypothesis that alkaloids act at a distance converges with what is known for the genera Solenopsis, Monomorium and Megalomyrmex when workers release volatile venom alkaloids by waving their stingers (i.e., gaster flagging) during interspecific encounters causing their enemies to flee.

== Distribution and habitat ==
Although widespread in the Neotropics, from southern Mexico to northern Argentina, Megalomyrmex species are never abundant. They occur in low to middle elevation wet to dry forest habitats. Some species are free-living with large diffuse nests in the soil (e.g. Megalomyrmex modestus) or small nests in dead wood (e.g. Megalomyrmex drifti). Others are specialized social parasites or predators of Attini (e.g. Megalomyrmex adamsae, Megalomyrmex mondabora, Megalomyrmex symmetochus, Megalomyrmex wettereri).

== Species ==
=== Extant ===
- Megalomyrmex acauna Brandão, 1990
- Megalomyrmex adamsae Longino, 2010
- Megalomyrmex ayri Brandão, 1990
- Megalomyrmex balzani Emery, 1894
- Megalomyrmex bidentatus Fernández & Baena, 1997
- Megalomyrmex brandaoi Boudinot et al., 2013
- Megalomyrmex caete Brandão, 1990
- Megalomyrmex cuatiara Brandão, 1990
- Megalomyrmex cupecuara Brandão, 1990
- Megalomyrmex cyendyra Brandão, 1990
- Megalomyrmex drifti Kempf, 1961
- Megalomyrmex emeryi Forel, 1904
- Megalomyrmex foreli Emery, 1890
- Megalomyrmex fungiraptor Boudinot et al., 2013
- Megalomyrmex glaesarius Kempf, 1970
- Megalomyrmex gnomus Kempf, 1970
- Megalomyrmex goeldii Forel, 1912
- Megalomyrmex iheringi Forel, 1911
- Megalomyrmex incisus Smith, 1947
- Megalomyrmex leoninus Forel, 1885
- Megalomyrmex longinoi Boudinot et al., 2013
- Megalomyrmex megadrifti Boudinot et al., 2013
- Megalomyrmex milenae Boudinot et al., 2013
- Megalomyrmex miri Brandão, 1990
- Megalomyrmex modestus Emery, 1896
- Megalomyrmex mondabora Brandão, 1990
- Megalomyrmex mondaboroides Longino, 2010
- Megalomyrmex myops Santschi, 1925
- Megalomyrmex nocarina Longino, 2010
- Megalomyrmex osadrifti Boudinot et al., 2013
- Megalomyrmex pacova Brandão, 1990
- Megalomyrmex peetersi do Prado & Adams, 2020
- Megalomyrmex piriana Brandão, 1990
- Megalomyrmex poatan Brandão, 1990
- Megalomyrmex pusillus Forel, 1912
- Megalomyrmex reina Longino, 2010
- Megalomyrmex silvestrii Wheeler, 1909
- Megalomyrmex staudingeri Emery, 1890
- Megalomyrmex symmetochus Wheeler, 1925
- Megalomyrmex tasyba Brandão, 1990
- Megalomyrmex timbira Brandão, 1990
- Megalomyrmex wallacei Mann, 1916
- Megalomyrmex wettereri Brandão, 2003
- Megalomyrmex weyrauchi Kempf, 1970

=== Unidentifiable ===
One species tentatively placed within the genus has subsequently been determined as unidentifiable to the species level due to various reasons like loss of or extensive damage to the type specimen, a description deemed too vague to identify to the species level, or often both simultaneously, although it technically remains a valid binomen.

- Megalomyrmex bituberculatus (Fabricius, 1798)
