= Megalomyrmex mondabora =

Scientific classification
- Domain: Eukaryota
- Kingdom: Animalia
- Phylum: Arthropoda
- Class: Insecta
- Order: Hymenoptera
- Family: Formicidae
- Subfamily: Myrmicinae
- Genus: Megalomyrmex
- Species: M. mondabora

Binomial name
- Megalomyrmex mondabora Brandão, 1990

Species of ant

Megalomyrmex mondabora is a Neotropical species of ants in the subfamily Myrmicinae. Known from Costa Rica. In Costa Rica this species occurs in wet forest habitats, typically in mature rainforest. Collections are from sea level to 800 m elevation on the Atlantic slope of the Cordillera Volcanica Central, Cordillera de Talamanca, and Cordillera de Guanacaste. It is a specialized nest parasite of attines and is found most often in nests of Cyphomyrmex cornutus. It cohabits with C. cornutus in their nests, feeding on both host brood and the host's fungal symbiont.
