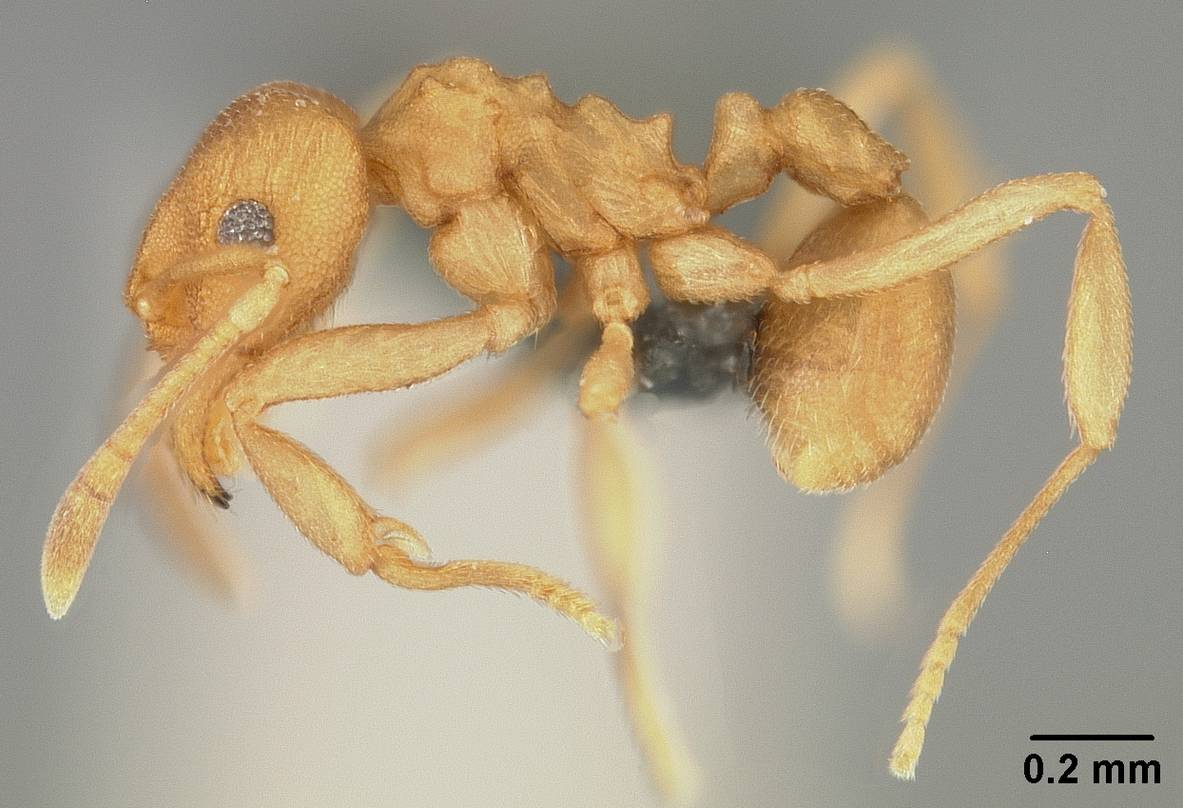

Scientific classification
- Kingdom: Animalia
- Phylum: Arthropoda
- Class: Insecta
- Order: Hymenoptera
- Family: Formicidae
- Subfamily: Myrmicinae
- Tribe: Attini
- Genus: Cyatta; Sosa-Calvo et al., 2013
- Species: C. abscondita

Binomial name
- Cyatta abscondita Sosa-Calvo et al., 2013

= Cyatta =

Genus of ant

Cyatta is a genus of ants in the subfamily Myrmicinae containing the single species Cyatta abscondita. It is considered the most recent ancestor of all fungus-farming ants and a living fossil.

== Etymology ==
Cyatta is a neologism constructed in part from the Brazilian Tupi language word Cy, meaning "sister," referring to its status, along with the genus Kalathomyrmex, as the sister clade to the remaining genera of the informal clade Neoattini, to which the genus Atta, the most conspicuous member of the Neoattini, belongs. The specific name abscondita refers to the exceedingly secretive nature of this species, which, after being recognized from a few rare specimens, proved frustratingly elusive during multiple attempts to locate it in the field.

== Discovery history ==
In 2003, a single stray worker of C. abscondita was taken in a pitfall trap as part of an ant survey conducted at the Reserva Particular do Patrimônio Natural Serra das Almas, Crateús, Ceará, Brazil, a relatively undisturbed area of Caatinga, a biome characterized by deciduous thorny woodland vegetation. The specimen was deposited in the Museum of Zoology of the University of São Paulo (MZUSP) ant collection, where it was at first associated with the Mycetophylax species group, but subsequently recognized as a new neoattine genus. This isolated specimen inspired the first attempt to locate C. abscondita in the field in Serra das Almas in 2009. Unfortunately, it was the end of the rainy season and the soil was covered by a dense layer of grass, impairing observations of all small and inconspicuous ants. Visual searching and leaf-litter extraction failed to locate additional specimens, as did subsequent surveys at the same locality.

In 2008, two workers were taken in pitfall traps in the Brazilian Institute of Geography and Statistics (IBGE) Cerrado preserve, near Fazenda Água Limpa (FAL) in Brasília, Federal District, Brazil. These specimens, deposited in the MZUSP, inspired attempts to locate the species at this locality beginning in 2009. The first such attempt yielded only the collection of a series of stray workers and an unsuccessful nest excavation; however, subsequent visits resulted in the excavations of multiple nests and collections of gynes, larvae, and cultivated fungi.

The only known male of the species was collected in 2011 from two nests of C. abscondita while excavating a nest of Mycocepurus goeldii in the Broa Preserve, Itirapina, São Paulo, Brazil.

The earliest known collection of C. abscondita was that of a stray worker taken in a leaf-litter sample in Paineiras, Minas Gerais, in 1999, only recently discovered in the entomological collection at MZUSP and recognized as belonging to this species. Most recently, in 2011, two workers of C. abscondita were recovered from pitfall traps in fragments of semideciduous forests in the Sales and Pindorama municipalities in northwestern São Paulo state. This history of discovery indicates that C. abscondita is rarely collected by traditional methods. The cryptic nature of foragers and of nest entrances makes it almost invisible to traditional hand collecting. The rarity of individuals in pitfall and leaf-litter samples remains puzzling, since the concentrations of nests encountered at FAL and Broa Preserve suggest that it is locally abundant.

== Phylogeny ==
Results of molecular phylogenetic analyses incorporating four nuclear gene sequences from Cyatta abscondita confirm the previous finding that the tribe Attini is divided by an ancient divergence into two major clades, the Paleoattini and the Neoattini. Cyatta abscondita occupies a relatively isolated position in the latter clade, distantly related to the monotypic genus Kalathomyrmex, the result of an early divergence in the Neoattini. Its phylogenetic position, nested well within the paraphyletic group of "lower attine ants," strongly supports the hypothesis that C. abscondita practices "lower attine agriculture".
