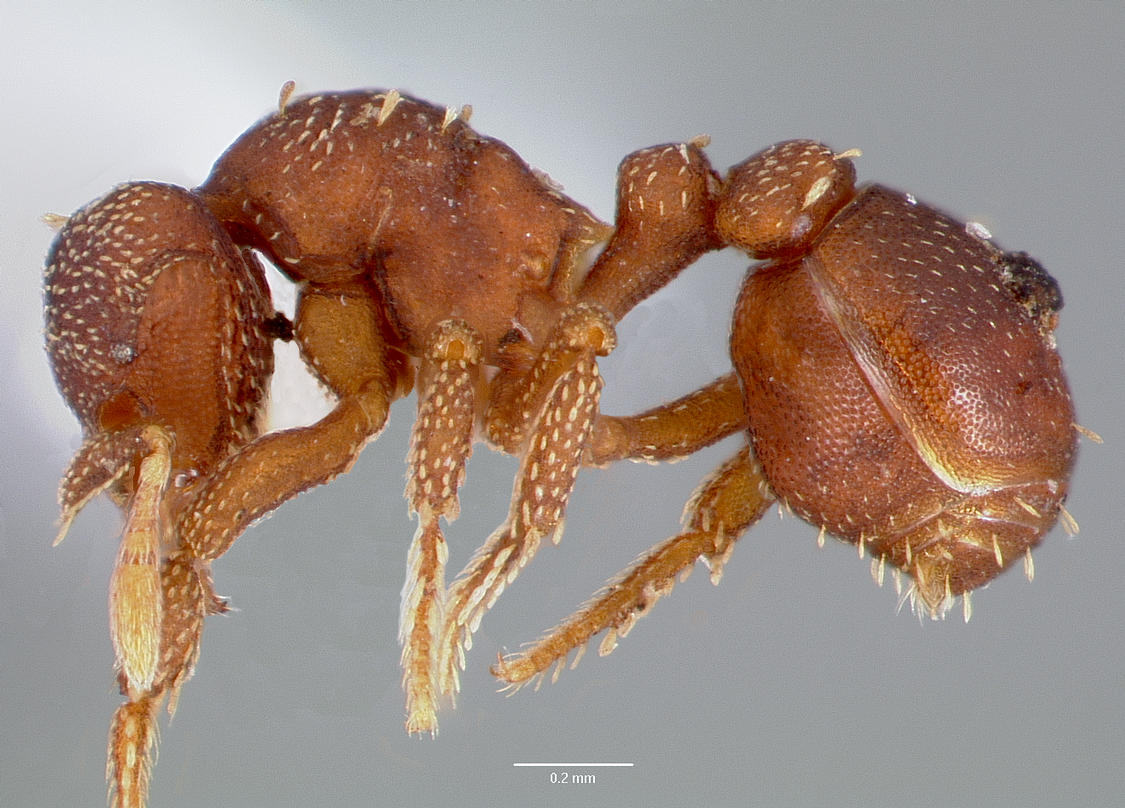
- Eurhopalothrix floridana worker

Scientific classification
- Kingdom: Animalia
- Phylum: Arthropoda
- Clade: Pancrustacea
- Class: Insecta
- Order: Hymenoptera
- Family: Formicidae
- Subfamily: Myrmicinae
- Tribe: Attini
- Genus: Eurhopalothrix; Brown & Kempf, 1961

Type species
- Rhopalothrix bolaui Mayr, 1870

Diversity
- 55 species

= Eurhopalothrix =

Genus of ants

Eurhopalothrix is a genus of ants in the subfamily Myrmicinae.

== Species ==
- Eurhopalothrix alopeciosa Brown & Kempf, 1960
- Eurhopalothrix apharogonia Snelling, 1968
- Eurhopalothrix australis Brown & Kempf, 1960
- Eurhopalothrix biroi (Szabó, 1910)
- Eurhopalothrix bolaui (Mayr, 1870)
- Eurhopalothrix brevicornis (Emery, 1897)
- Eurhopalothrix browni Taylor, 1990
- Eurhopalothrix bruchi (Santschi, 1922)
- Eurhopalothrix caledonica Brown & Kempf, 1960
- Eurhopalothrix chapmani Taylor, 1990
- Eurhopalothrix cimu Longino, 2013
- Eurhopalothrix cinnamea Taylor, 1970
- Eurhopalothrix circumcapillum Longino, 2013
- Eurhopalothrix clypeata Brown & Kempf, 1960
- Eurhopalothrix coronata Taylor, 1990
- Eurhopalothrix depressa Ketterl, Verhaagh & Dietz, 2004
- Eurhopalothrix dubia Taylor, 1990
- Eurhopalothrix elke Mezger & Pfeiffer, 2010
- Eurhopalothrix emeryi (Forel, 1912)
- Eurhopalothrix floridana Brown & Kempf, 1960
- Eurhopalothrix gravis (Mann, 1922)
- Eurhopalothrix greensladei Taylor, 1968
- Eurhopalothrix guadeloupensis Longino, 2013
- Eurhopalothrix heliscata Wilson & Brown, 1985
- Eurhopalothrix hoplites Taylor, 1980
- Eurhopalothrix hunhau Longino, 2013
- Eurhopalothrix insidiatrix (Taylor, 1980)
- Eurhopalothrix isabellae (Mann, 1919)
- Eurhopalothrix jennya Taylor, 1990
- Eurhopalothrix lenkoi Kempf, 1967
- Eurhopalothrix mabuya Longino, 2013
- Eurhopalothrix machaquila Longino, 2013
- Eurhopalothrix megalops Longino, 2013
- Eurhopalothrix omnivaga Taylor, 1990
- Eurhopalothrix ortizae Longino, 2013
- Eurhopalothrix oscillum Longino, 2013
- Eurhopalothrix oxente Celante & Celante, 2024
- Eurhopalothrix papuana (De Andrade, 2007)
- Eurhopalothrix philippina Brown & Kempf, 1960
- Eurhopalothrix pilulifera Brown & Kempf, 1960
- Eurhopalothrix platisquama Taylor, 1990
- Eurhopalothrix procera (Emery, 1897)
- Eurhopalothrix punctata (Szabó, 1910)
- Eurhopalothrix reichenspergeri (Santschi, 1923)
- Eurhopalothrix rothschildi Taylor, 1990
- Eurhopalothrix schmidti (Menozzi, 1936)
- Eurhopalothrix seguensis Taylor, 1990
- Eurhopalothrix semicapillum Longino, 2013
- Eurhopalothrix sepultura Longino, 2013
- Eurhopalothrix speciosa Brown & Kempf, 1960
- Eurhopalothrix spectabilis Kempf, 1962
- Eurhopalothrix szentivanyi Taylor, 1968
- Eurhopalothrix vulcan Longino, 2013
- Eurhopalothrix xibalba Longino, 2013
- Eurhopalothrix zipacna Longino, 2013
