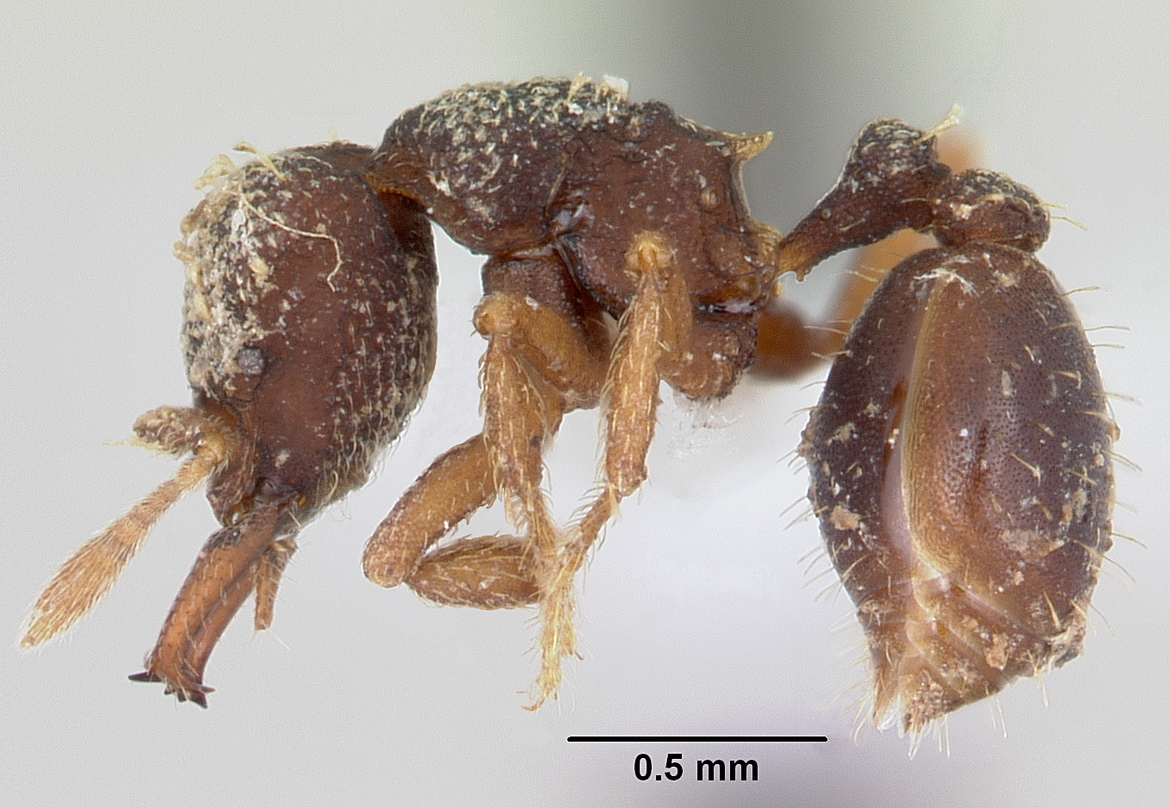
- Rhopalothrix ciliata worker from Ecuador

Scientific classification
- Domain: Eukaryota
- Kingdom: Animalia
- Phylum: Arthropoda
- Class: Insecta
- Order: Hymenoptera
- Family: Formicidae
- Subfamily: Myrmicinae
- Tribe: Attini
- Genus: Rhopalothrix; Mayr, 1870

Type species
- Rhopalothrix ciliata Mayr, 1870

Diversity
- 16 species

Synonyms
- Acanthidris Weber, 1941; Heptastruma Weber, 1934

= Rhopalothrix =

Genus of ants

Rhopalothrix is a genus of ants in the subfamily Myrmicinae.

== Species ==
- Rhopalothrix andersoni Longino & Boudinot, 2013
- Rhopalothrix apertor Longino & Boudinot, 2013
- Rhopalothrix atitlanica Longino & Boudinot, 2013
- Rhopalothrix ciliata Mayr, 1870
- Rhopalothrix diadema Brown & Kempf, 1960
- Rhopalothrix isthmica (Weber, 1941)
- Rhopalothrix kusnezovi Brown & Kempf, 1960
- Rhopalothrix megisthmica Longino & Boudinot, 2013
- Rhopalothrix nubilosa Longino & Boudinot, 2013
- Rhopalothrix orbis Taylor, 1968
- Rhopalothrix plaumanni Brown & Kempf, 1960
- Rhopalothrix stannardi Brown & Kempf, 1960
- Rhopalothrix subspatulata Longino & Boudinot, 2013
- Rhopalothrix therion Longino & Boudinot, 2013
- Rhopalothrix triumphalis Longino & Boudinot, 2013
- Rhopalothrix weberi Brown & Kempf, 1960
