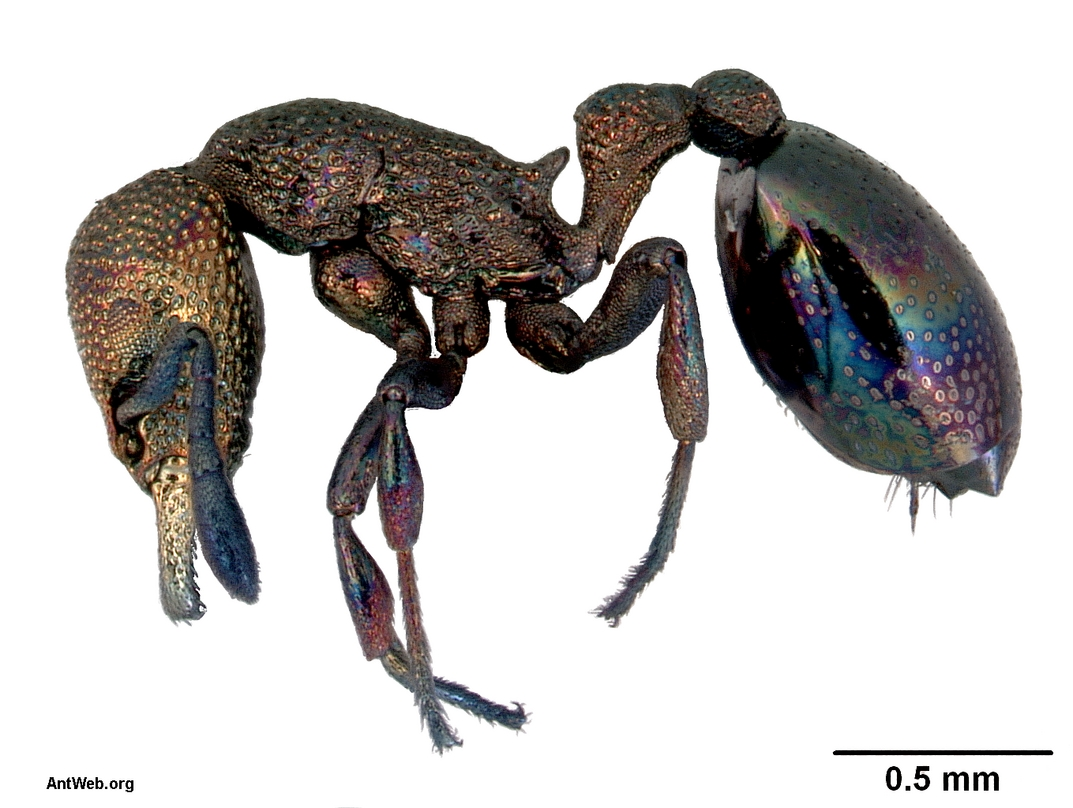
- Mesostruma eccentrica worker, holotype

Scientific classification
- Kingdom: Animalia
- Phylum: Arthropoda
- Class: Insecta
- Order: Hymenoptera
- Family: Formicidae
- Subfamily: Myrmicinae
- Tribe: Attini
- Genus: Mesostruma; Brown, 1948

Type species
- Strumigenys turneri Forel, 1895

Diversity
- 9 species

= Mesostruma =

Genus of ants

Mesostruma is a genus of ants in the subfamily Myrmicinae. It is restricted to Australia.

== Species ==
- Mesostruma bella Shattuck, 2000
- Mesostruma browni Taylor, 1962
- Mesostruma eccentrica Taylor, 1973
- Mesostruma exolympica Taylor, 1973
- Mesostruma inornata Shattuck, 2000
- Mesostruma laevigata Brown, 1952
- Mesostruma loweryi Taylor, 1973
- Mesostruma spinosa Shattuck, 2007
- Mesostruma turneri (Forel, 1895)
