= Atta insularis =

Scientific classification
- Kingdom: Animalia
- Phylum: Arthropoda
- Clade: Pancrustacea
- Class: Insecta
- Order: Hymenoptera
- Family: Formicidae
- Subfamily: Myrmicinae
- Genus: Atta
- Species: A. insularis

Binomial name
- Atta insularis (Guérin-Méneville, 1845)

Species of leafcutter ant endemic to Cuba

Atta insularis is a species of leafcutter ant, a New World ant of the subfamily Myrmicinae of the genus Atta endemic to Cuba. This species is from one of the two genera of advanced fungus-growing ants within the tribe Attini.

This species is the largest and most notable species of ant of Cuba. A. insularis is unique to Cuba, and has great polymorphism. Its workers specialize in different activities. The warriors have remarkably large heads.

They prefer to work at night, although they do by day, more if on cloudy days.

The nests are huge, and may comprise one or several mounds that can be spaced several metres apart. The height of the mound can sometimes exceed a metre. These nests in natural sites can be very durable, even more than 50 years.

This species is a pest of citrus, coffee, and various Pinus species.

Quantitative studies in the behaviour of A. insularis has been performed both in laboratory-controlled conditions, and in the wild.

== Gallery ==
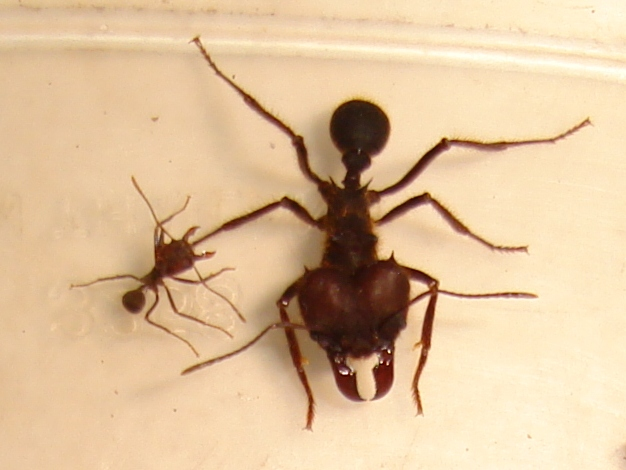

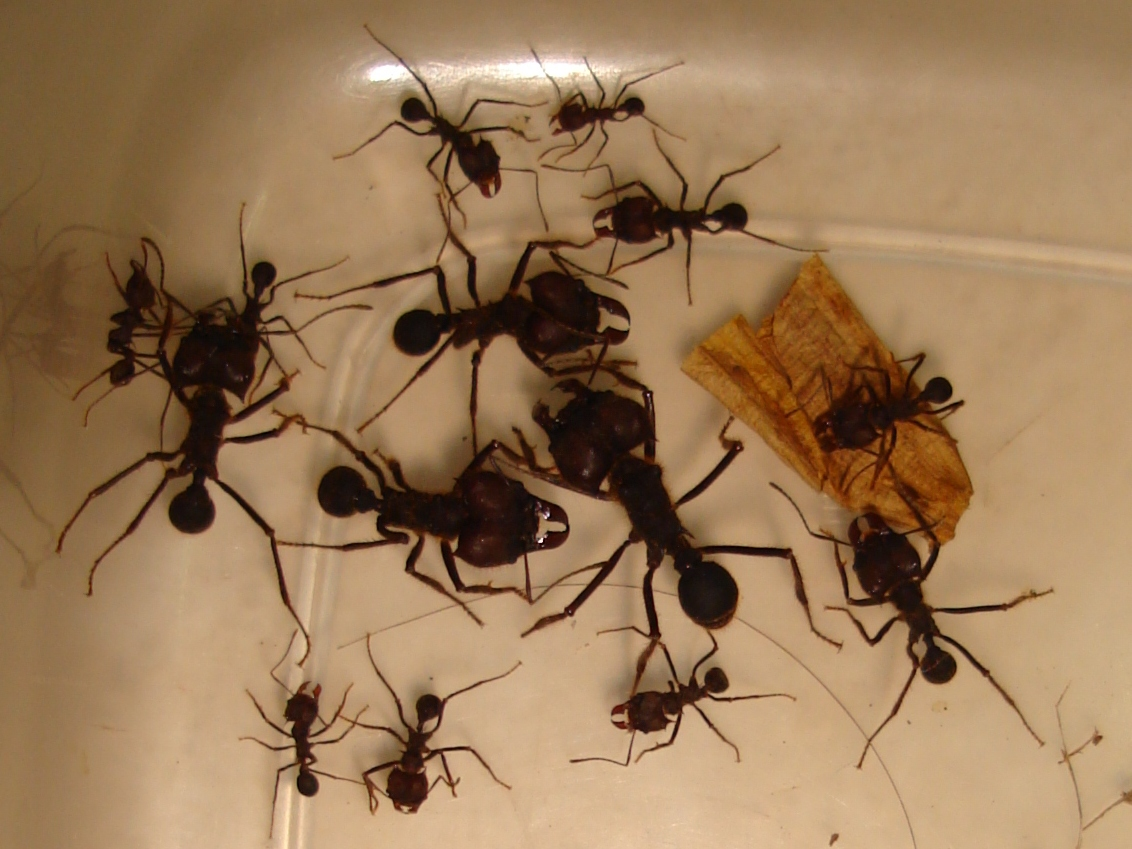

== See also ==
- List of leafcutter ants
- Symmetry breaking of escaping ants
