= Mycetagroicus inflatus =

Scientific classification
- Domain: Eukaryota
- Kingdom: Animalia
- Phylum: Arthropoda
- Class: Insecta
- Order: Hymenoptera
- Family: Formicidae
- Subfamily: Myrmicinae
- Genus: Mycetagroicus
- Species: M. inflatus

Binomial name
- Mycetagroicus inflatus Brandao, C. R. F. & Mayhe-Nunes, A. J., 2008

Species of ant

Mycetagroicus inflatus is an ant species which was discovered in 2005 by R.R. Silva and R. Feitosa in Brazil, and described by Brandao and Mayhe-Nunes in 2008.
