= Leucocoprinus dunensis =

Scientific classification
- Domain: Eukaryota
- Kingdom: Fungi
- Division: Basidiomycota
- Class: Agaricomycetes
- Order: Agaricales
- Family: Agaricaceae
- Genus: Leucocoprinus
- Species: L. dunensis

Binomial name
- Leucocoprinus dunensis S. Urrea-Valencia, A. Rodrigues & R.J. Bizarria (2023)

Species of fungus

Leucocoprinus dunensis Mycological characteristics
- Gills on hymenium
- Cap is campanulate or flat
- Hymenium is free
- Stipe has a ring
- Spore print is white
- Ecology is saprotrophic
- Edibility is unknown

Leucocoprinus dunensis is a species of mushroom-producing fungus in the family Agaricaceae.

== Taxonomy ==
It was described in 2023 by the mycologists Salomé Urrea‑Valencia, Rodolfo Bizarria Júnior, Pepijn W. Kooij, Quimi Vidaurre Montoya and Andre Rodrigues who conducted a study on fungal species cultivated by lower attine ants which described the new species Leucocoprinus dunensis and L. attinorum.

== Description ==
Leucocoprinus dunensis is a fungus cultivated by Mycetophylax morschi ants.

Cap: 3.5-4cm wide, starting campanulate before expanding to applanate with age. The surface is covered with small light brown scales towards the margin with a solid brown centre disc. The margins are sometimes striated. Gills: Free with a collar, crowded and whitish with a fimbriate edge. Stem: 3-7cm long and 2-5mm thick without a significantly bulbous base. The surface is brownish orange and covered in fine fibrils. The ascendant stem ring is white and is located towards the top of the stem (superior). Spore print: Pale white. Spores: 7-8 (9) x 5-6 μm. Amygdaliform in side view and ellipsoidal in front view. Smooth, thick walled with an inconspicuous germ pore. Hyaline with no colour change in KOH. Congophilous, dextrinoid, metachromatic in cresyl blue. Basidia: 20-22 x 10 μm. Clavate, 2 to 4-spored, hyaline.

== Etymology ==
The specific epithet dunensis is named in reference to the dune ecosystem in which Mycetophylax morschi lives.

== Habitat and distribution ==
The species is cultivated by the fungus farming ant species Mycetophylax morschi, which is found in the sandy restinga forests of Brazil.
