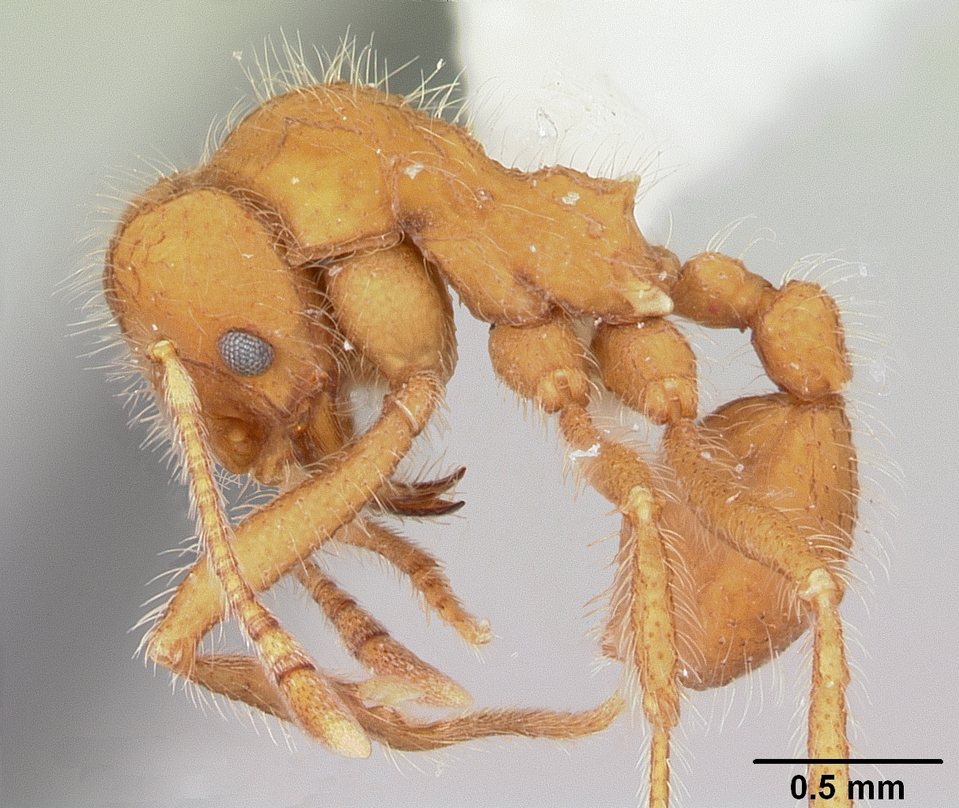
- Mycetagroicus cerradensis worker from Brazil

Scientific classification
- Domain: Eukaryota
- Kingdom: Animalia
- Phylum: Arthropoda
- Class: Insecta
- Order: Hymenoptera
- Family: Formicidae
- Subfamily: Myrmicinae
- Tribe: Attini
- Genus: Mycetagroicus; Brandao & Mayhe-Nunes, 2001

Diversity
- 4 species

= Mycetagroicus =

Genus of ants

Mycetagroicus is a genus of fungus-growing ants in the subfamily Myrmicinae.

== Systematics ==
- Mycetagroicus cerradensis Brandão & Mayhé-Nunes, 2001
- Mycetagroicus inflatus Brandão & Mayhé-Nunes, 2008
- Mycetagroicus triangularis Brandão & Mayhé-Nunes, 2001
- Mycetagroicus urbanus Brandão & Mayhé-Nunes, 2001
