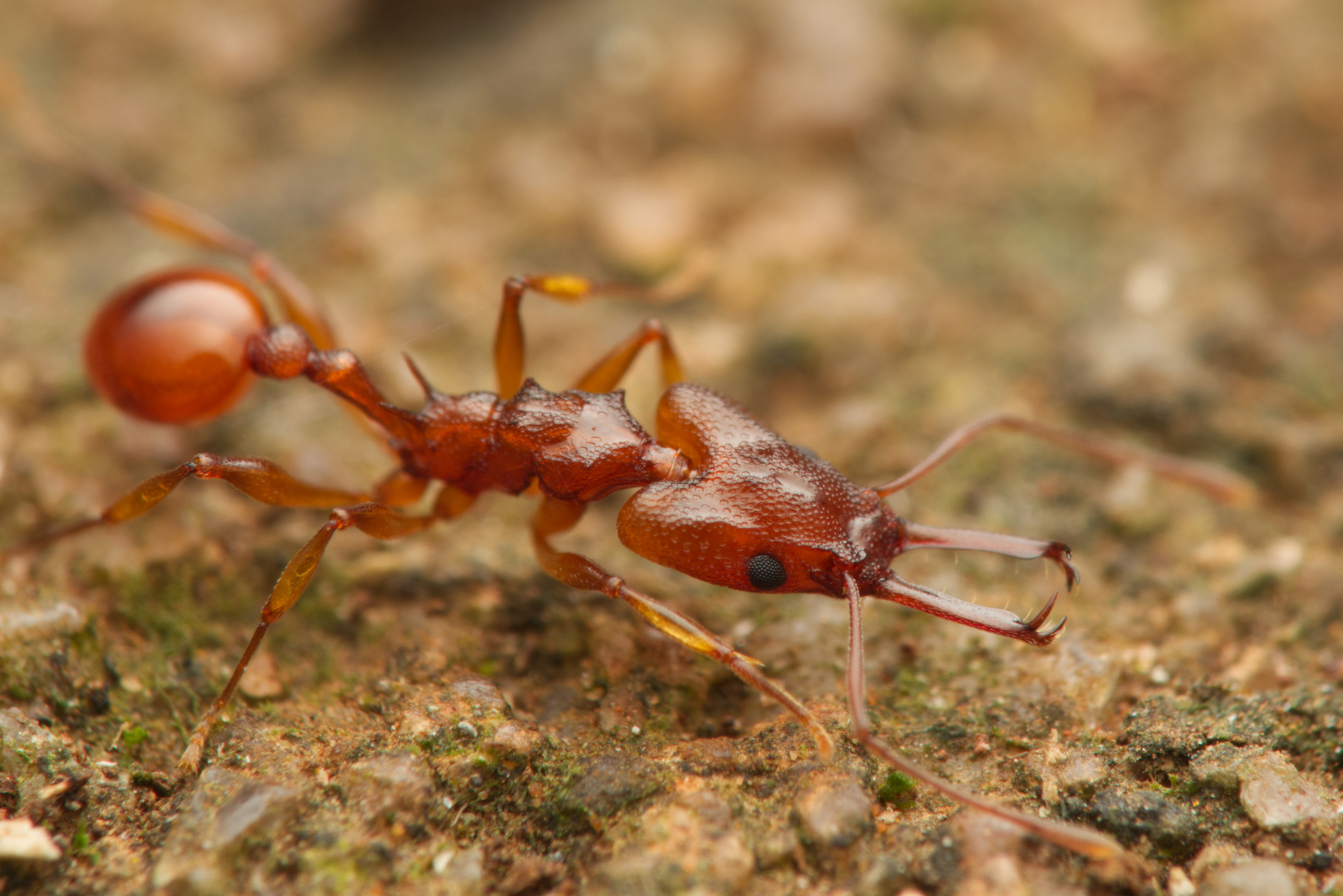
- Orectognathus antennatus worker

Scientific classification
- Kingdom: Animalia
- Phylum: Arthropoda
- Class: Insecta
- Order: Hymenoptera
- Family: Formicidae
- Subfamily: Myrmicinae
- Tribe: Attini
- Genus: Orectognathus; Smith, 1854

Type species
- Orectognathus antennatus Smith, 1854

Diversity
- 29 species

Synonyms
- Arnoldidris Brown, 1950

= Orectognathus =

Genus of ants

Orectognathus is a genus of ants in the subfamily Myrmicinae.

== Species ==
- Orectognathus alligator Taylor, 1980
- Orectognathus antennatus Smith, 1854
- Orectognathus biroi Szabó, 1926
- Orectognathus chyzeri Emery, 1897
- Orectognathus clarki Brown, 1953
- Orectognathus coccinatus Taylor, 1980
- Orectognathus csikii Szabó, 1926
- Orectognathus darlingtoni Taylor, 1977
- Orectognathus echinus Taylor & Lowery, 1972
- Orectognathus elegantulus Taylor, 1977
- Orectognathus horvathi Szabó, 1926
- Orectognathus howensis Wheeler, 1927
- Orectognathus hystrix Taylor & Lowery, 1972

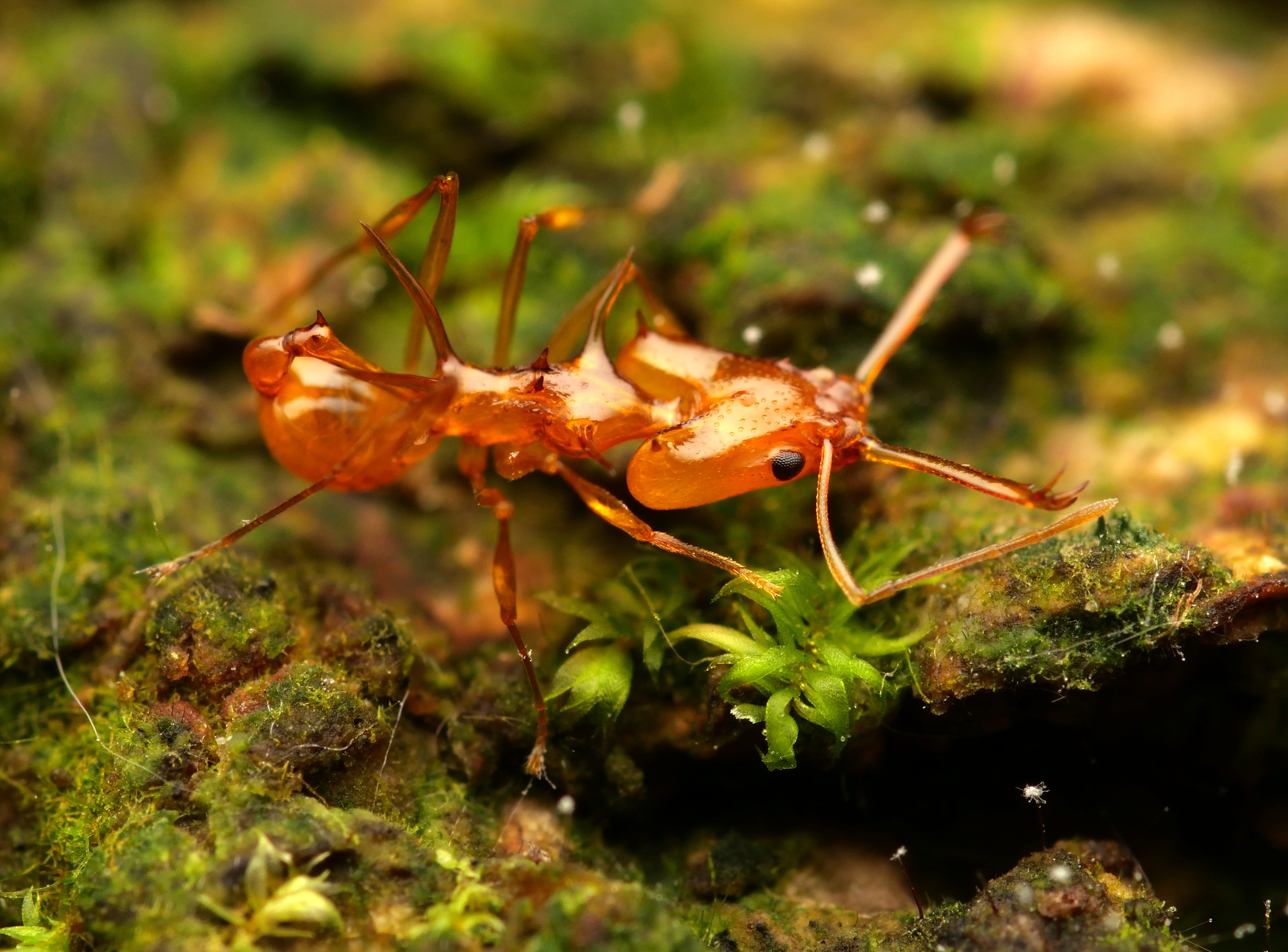
O. hystrix

- Orectognathus kanangra Taylor, 1980
- Orectognathus longispinosus Donisthorpe, 1941
- Orectognathus mjobergi Forel, 1915
- Orectognathus nanus Taylor, 1977
- Orectognathus nigriventris Mercovich, 1958
- Orectognathus parvispinus Taylor, 1977
- Orectognathus phyllobates Brown, 1958
- Orectognathus robustus Taylor, 1977
- Orectognathus roomi Taylor, 1977
- Orectognathus rostratus Lowery, 1967
- Orectognathus sarasini Emery, 1914
- Orectognathus satan Brown, 1953
- Orectognathus sexspinosus Forel, 1915
- Orectognathus szentivanyi (Brown, 1958)

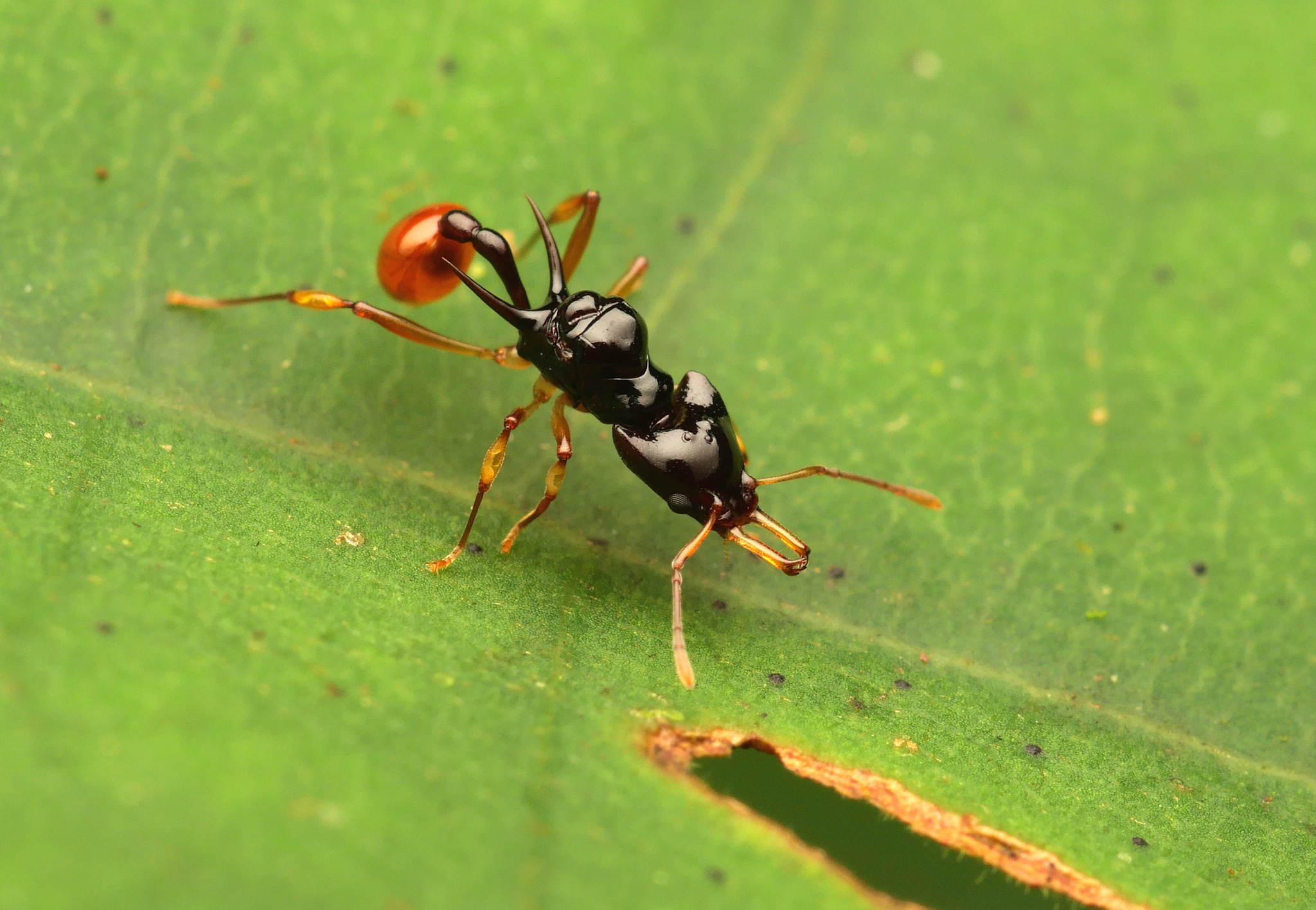
O. szentivanyi

- Orectognathus velutinus Taylor, 1977
- Orectognathus versicolor Donisthorpe, 1940

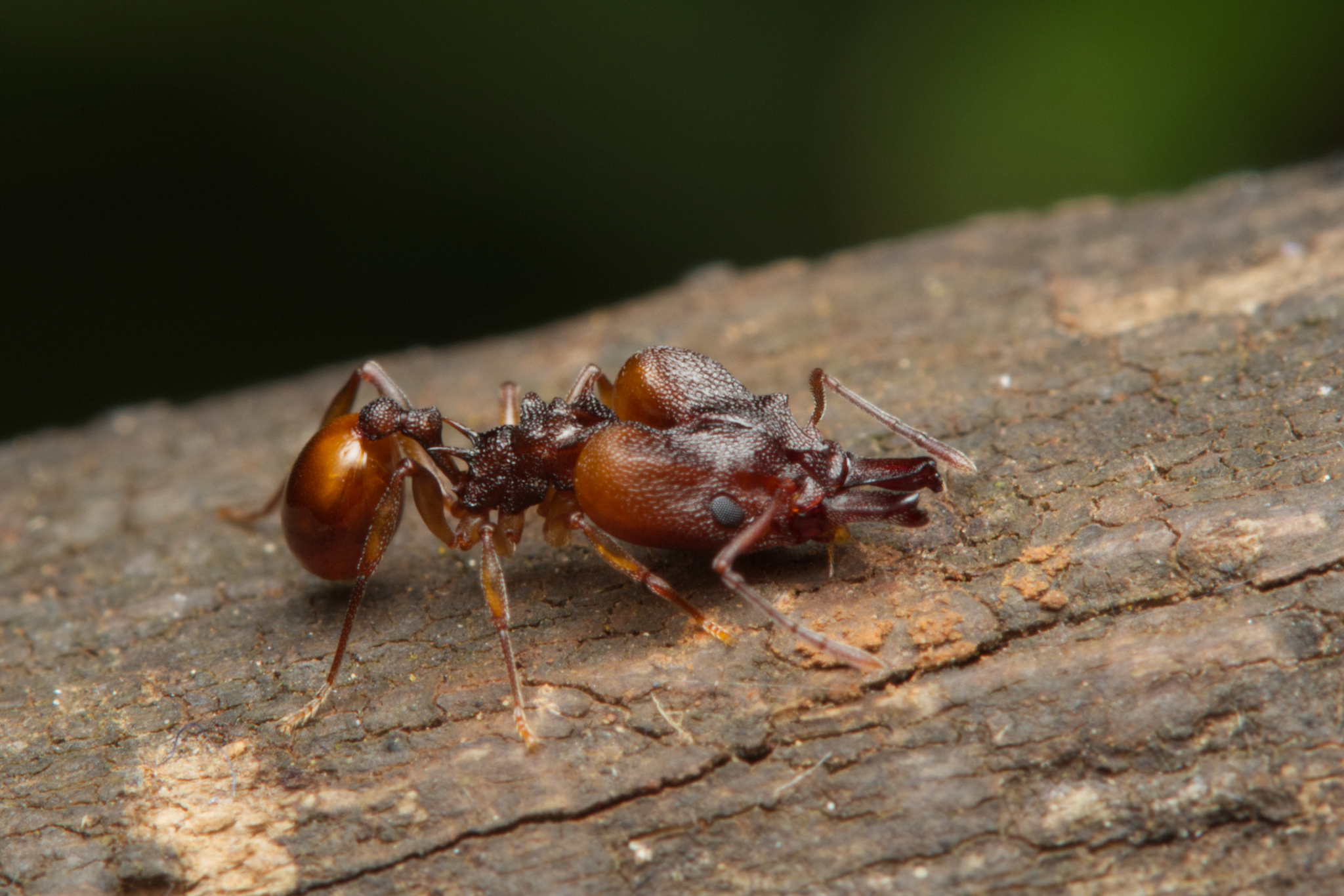
O. versicolor
