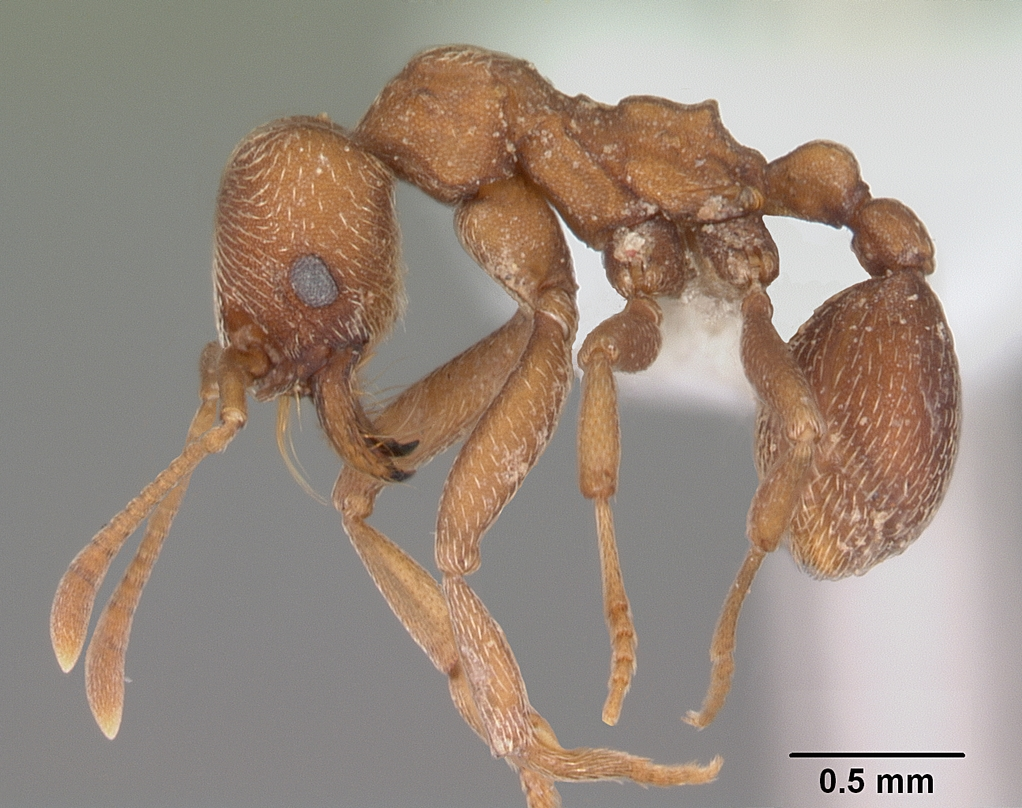
- Kalathomyrmex emeryi worker

Scientific classification
- Domain: Eukaryota
- Kingdom: Animalia
- Phylum: Arthropoda
- Class: Insecta
- Order: Hymenoptera
- Family: Formicidae
- Subfamily: Myrmicinae
- Tribe: Attini
- Genus: Kalathomyrmex; Klingenberg, C. & Brandao, C. R. F., 2009
- Species: K. emeryi

Binomial name
- Kalathomyrmex emeryi (Forel, 1907)

Synonyms
- Myrmicocrypta emeryi Forel (type species of Kalathomyrmex)

= Kalathomyrmex =

Genus of ants

Kalathomyrmex is a genus of ant in the subfamily Myrmicinae containing the single species Kalathomyrmex emeryi. First described as Myrmicocrypta emeryi by Forel in 1907, the species was most recently moved to its current genus by Klingenberg and Brandao in 2009.
