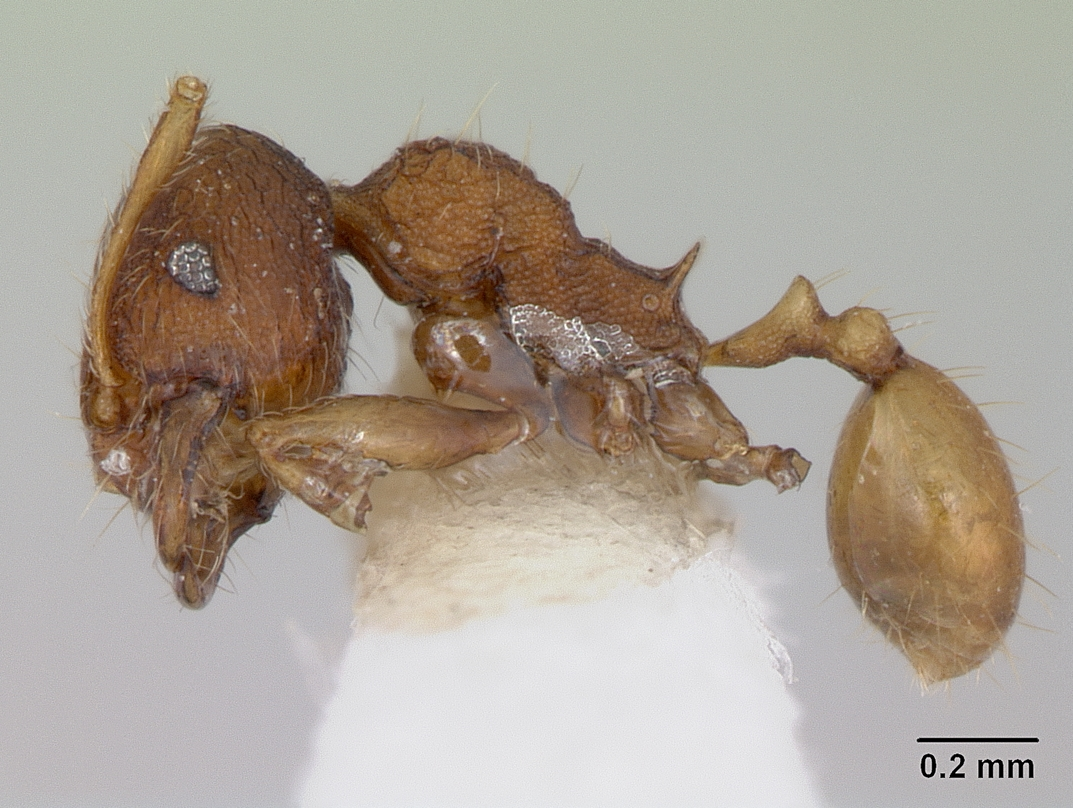
- Chimaeridris boltoni worker

Scientific classification
- Domain: Eukaryota
- Kingdom: Animalia
- Phylum: Arthropoda
- Class: Insecta
- Order: Hymenoptera
- Family: Formicidae
- Subfamily: Myrmicinae
- Tribe: Attini
- Genus: Chimaeridris; Wilson, 1989

Type species
- Chimaeridris boltoni Wilson, 1989

Diversity
- 2 species

= Chimaeridris =

Genus of ants

Chimaeridris is a small genus of ants in the subfamily Myrmicinae. The genus contains two species known from tropical Asia. Their unique hook-shaped mandibles and similar appearance to Pheidole minor workers raises the possibility that the genus is a slave-maker of Pheidole ants or a specialized predator.

== Species ==
- Chimaeridris boltoni Wilson, 1989 – Sulawesi
- Chimaeridris burckhardti Wilson, 1989 – Sabah
