= Symmetry breaking of escaping ants =

Pattern in ant behaviour

Symmetry breaking of escaping ants is a herd behavior phenomenon observed when ants are constrained to a cell with two equidistant exits and then sprayed with an insect repellent. The ants tend to crowd one door more while trying to escape (i.e., there is a symmetry breaking in their escape behavior), thereby decreasing evacuation efficiency.

== Description ==
This phenomenon arises in experiments where worker ants are enclosed in circular cells with a glass cover in such a way that they can only move in two dimensions (i.e., ants cannot pass over one other). The cell has two exits located symmetrically relative to its center. The experiments consisted of two different sets of trials. In the first set of trials, both exits were opened at the same time, letting the ants escape. After 30 repetitions, one door was used 13.666% more than the other. In the second set of trials, the configuration was identical, but a few seconds before opening the doors, a dose of 50 μL of insect repellent was injected into the cell at its center through a small hole in the glass cover. After 30 repetitions, one door was used 38.3% more than the other.

== History ==
Inspired by earlier computer simulations that predicted a symmetry-breaking phenomenon when panicked humans escape from a room with two equivalent exits, a team of researchers led by E. Altschuler carried out the two experiments described above, which revealed the symmetry-breaking effect in the leafcutter ant Atta insular in the presence of insect repellent.

Another team of researchers led by Geng Li investigated the influence of the ant group's density on the symmetry breaking. They used the red imported fire ant to repeat the experiment with different amounts of ants. The results show that symmetry breaking is high at low densities of ants, but decreases beyond a certain point in the density of ants. In other words, when density is low, the ant group produces a collective escaping behavior, while at high density, their behavior is more like random particles.

== Explanations ==
The common idea is that the action of injecting the insect repellent induces herd behavior in the ants. When ants are in "panic", they experience a strong tendency to follow each other. As a result, if a random fluctuation in the system produces a locally large amount of ants trying to reach one of the two doors, the fluctuation can be amplified because ants tend to follow the direction of the majority of individuals, resulting in that door getting crowded.

Altshuler and coworkers were able to reproduce their symmetry-breaking experiments previously done in ants in humans, using a simplified version of the theoretical model proposed earlier by Helbing et al. based on the fact that walkers tend to follow the general direction of motion of their neighbors ("Vicsek's rule"), and such herd behavior increases as the so-called "panic parameter" increases. In the case of ants, the panic parameter is supposed to be low when no repellent is used and high when the repellent is used.

A more "biologically sensible" model based on the deposition of an alarm pheromone by ants under stress also reproduces the symmetry-breaking phenomenon, with the advantage that it also predicts the experimental output for different concentrations of ants in the cell. The pheromone mechanism shares the key elements of the previous models: stressed ants tend to "follow the crowd".
