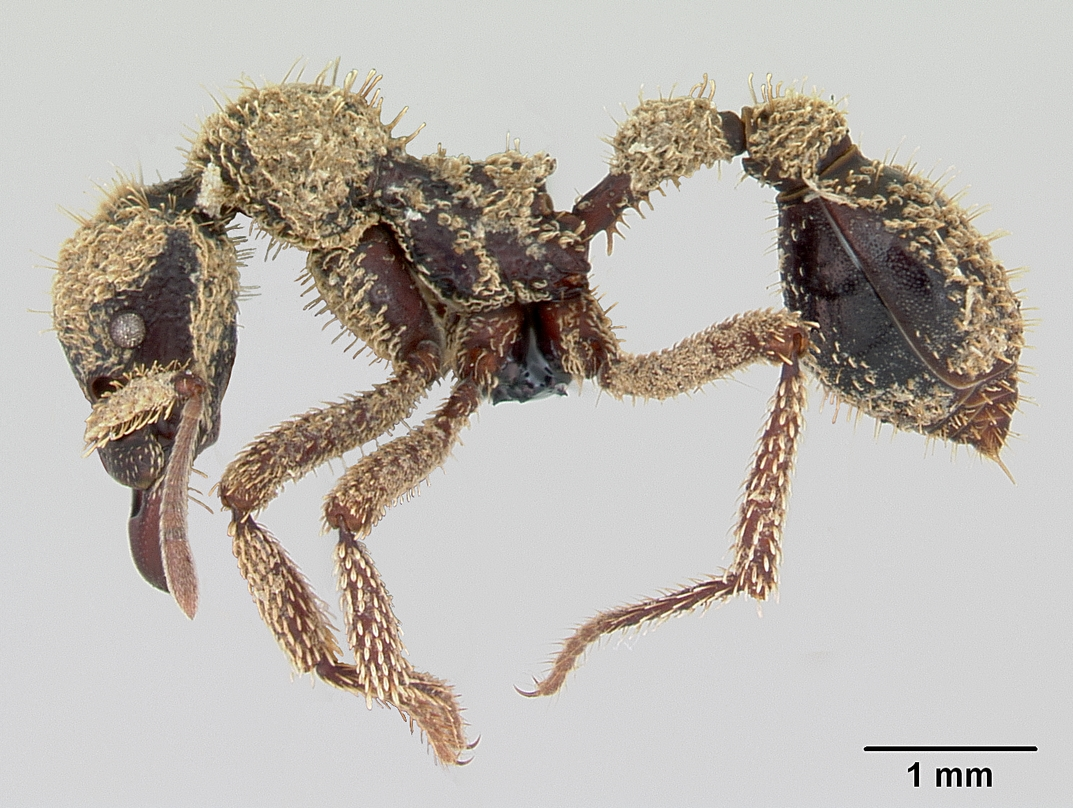
- Basiceros manni worker

Scientific classification
- Domain: Eukaryota
- Kingdom: Animalia
- Phylum: Arthropoda
- Class: Insecta
- Order: Hymenoptera
- Family: Formicidae
- Subfamily: Myrmicinae
- Tribe: Attini
- Genus: Basiceros; Schulz, 1906

Diversity
- 9 species

Synonyms
- Ceratobasis Smith, F., 1860 (Preocc.); Creightonidris Brown, 1949 Aspididris Weber, 1950

= Basiceros =

Genus of ants

Basiceros is a genus of ants in the subfamily Myrmicinae.

== Species ==
- Basiceros browni Probst & Brandão, 2022
- Basiceros conjugans Brown, 1974
- Basiceros convexiceps (Mayr, 1887)
- Basiceros disciger (Mayr, 1887)
- Basiceros manni Brown & Kempf, 1960
- Basiceros militaris (Weber, 1950)
- Basiceros scambognathus (Brown, 1949)
- Basiceros singularis (Smith, 1858)
- Basiceros tumucumaquensis Probst & Brandão, 2022
