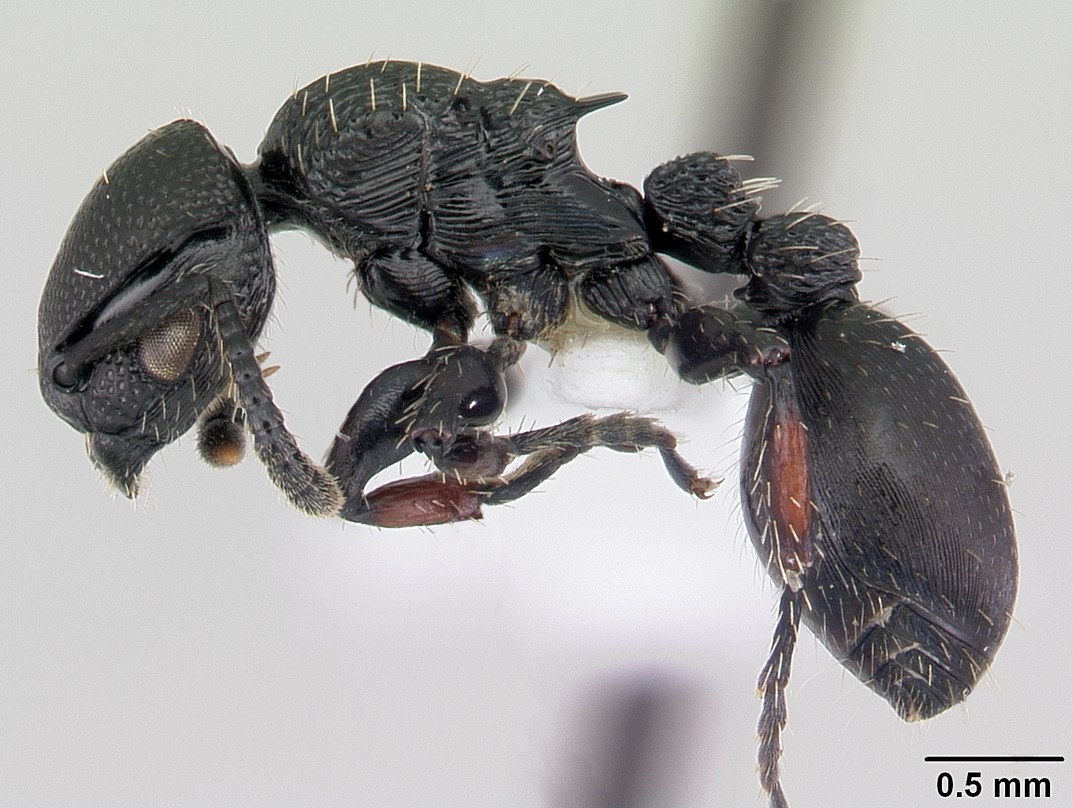
- Procryptocerus hylaeus worker from Paraguay

Scientific classification
- Domain: Eukaryota
- Kingdom: Animalia
- Phylum: Arthropoda
- Class: Insecta
- Order: Hymenoptera
- Family: Formicidae
- Subfamily: Myrmicinae
- Tribe: Attini
- Genus: Procryptocerus; Emery, 1887

Type species
- Meranoplus striatus Smith, 1860

Diversity
- 45 species

= Procryptocerus =

Genus of ants

Procryptocerus is a Neotropical genus of gliding ants, with the ability to "parachute" by steering their fall if they drop off of the tree they were on.

== Distribution ==
Procryptocerus inhabits rainforests from the Isthmus of Tehuantepec in Mexico to northern Argentina. Due to their cryptic habits, living inside twigs, these ants are rarely collected. At present, most species are known from Central America, Colombia and Brazil.

== Taxonomy ==
The genus was created by Emery (1887) to include species of Neotropical ants that were considered similar to those of the Paleotropical genus Cataulacus.

Procryptocerus has been the object of two revisionary studies. Kempf (1951) revised the entire genus and Longino and Snelling (2002) the Central American species. Kempf (1951) recognized 28 species, and 8 subspecies, while for Central America Longino and Snelling (2002) recognized 14 species, described four new species, synonymized two species, and elevated two subspecies to species level. Currently, 45 species are included in the genus.

== Description ==
The genus is characterized by the protrusion of the clypeus forming a broad nasus and antennal scrobes over the eyes. The toruli are located right posterior to the flanks of the nasus opposite to each other. The vertex is deflexed posteriorly in most species. Procryptocerus ants possess notoriously variable morphology. Different characters, such as propodeal spine length, form of the clypeus, type of sculpture, and other such characters vary remarkably, sometimes even within the same species. Knowledge of morphology and anatomy is incomplete for all species.

Adult workers are mostly black in color, body variously sculptured and monomorphic, ranging from 3.5 to 8.5 mm. Although similar to workers, gyne are larger (3.7–9.5 mm) with thoracic sclerites corresponding to alates in other apocritans. Males are longer and more slender than gynes, ranging from 4.8 mm to 9.9 mm in length.

== Species ==
- Procryptocerus adlerzi (Mayr, 1887)
- Procryptocerus attenuatus (Smith, 1876)
- Procryptocerus balzani Emery, 1894
- Procryptocerus batesi Forel, 1899
- Procryptocerus belti Forel, 1899
- Procryptocerus carbonarius (Mayr, 1870)
- Procryptocerus clathratus Emery, 1896
- Procryptocerus convergens (Mayr, 1887)
- Procryptocerus convexus Forel, 1904
- Procryptocerus coriarius (Mayr, 1870)
- Procryptocerus curvistriatus Kempf, 1949
- Procryptocerus eladio Longino & Snelling, 2002
- Procryptocerus elegans Santschi, 1921
- Procryptocerus ferreri Forel, 1912
- Procryptocerus gibbosus Kempf, 1949
- Procryptocerus goeldii Forel, 1899
- Procryptocerus gracilis (Smith, 1858)
- Procryptocerus hirsutus Emery, 1896
- Procryptocerus hylaeus Kempf, 1951
- Procryptocerus impressus Forel, 1899
- Procryptocerus kempfi Longino & Snelling, 2002
- Procryptocerus lenkoi Kempf, 1969
- Procryptocerus lepidus Forel, 1908
- Procryptocerus marginatus Borgmeier, 1948
- Procryptocerus mayri Forel, 1899
- Procryptocerus montanus Kempf, 1957
- Procryptocerus nalini Longino & Snelling, 2002
- Procryptocerus paleatus Emery, 1896
- Procryptocerus petiolatus (Smith, 1853)
- Procryptocerus pictipes Emery, 1896
- Procryptocerus regularis Emery, 1888
- Procryptocerus rudis (Mayr, 1870)
- Procryptocerus sampaioi Forel, 1912
- Procryptocerus scabriusculus Forel, 1899
- Procryptocerus schmalzi Emery, 1894
- Procryptocerus schmitti Forel, 1901
- Procryptocerus seabrai Kempf, 1964
- Procryptocerus spiniperdus Forel, 1899
- Procryptocerus spinosus (Smith, 1859)
- Procryptocerus striatus (Smith, 1860)
- Procryptocerus subpilosus (Smith, 1860)
- Procryptocerus sulcatus Emery, 1894
- Procryptocerus tortuguero Longino & Snelling, 2002
- Procryptocerus victoris Kempf, 1960
- Procryptocerus virgatus Kempf, 1964
