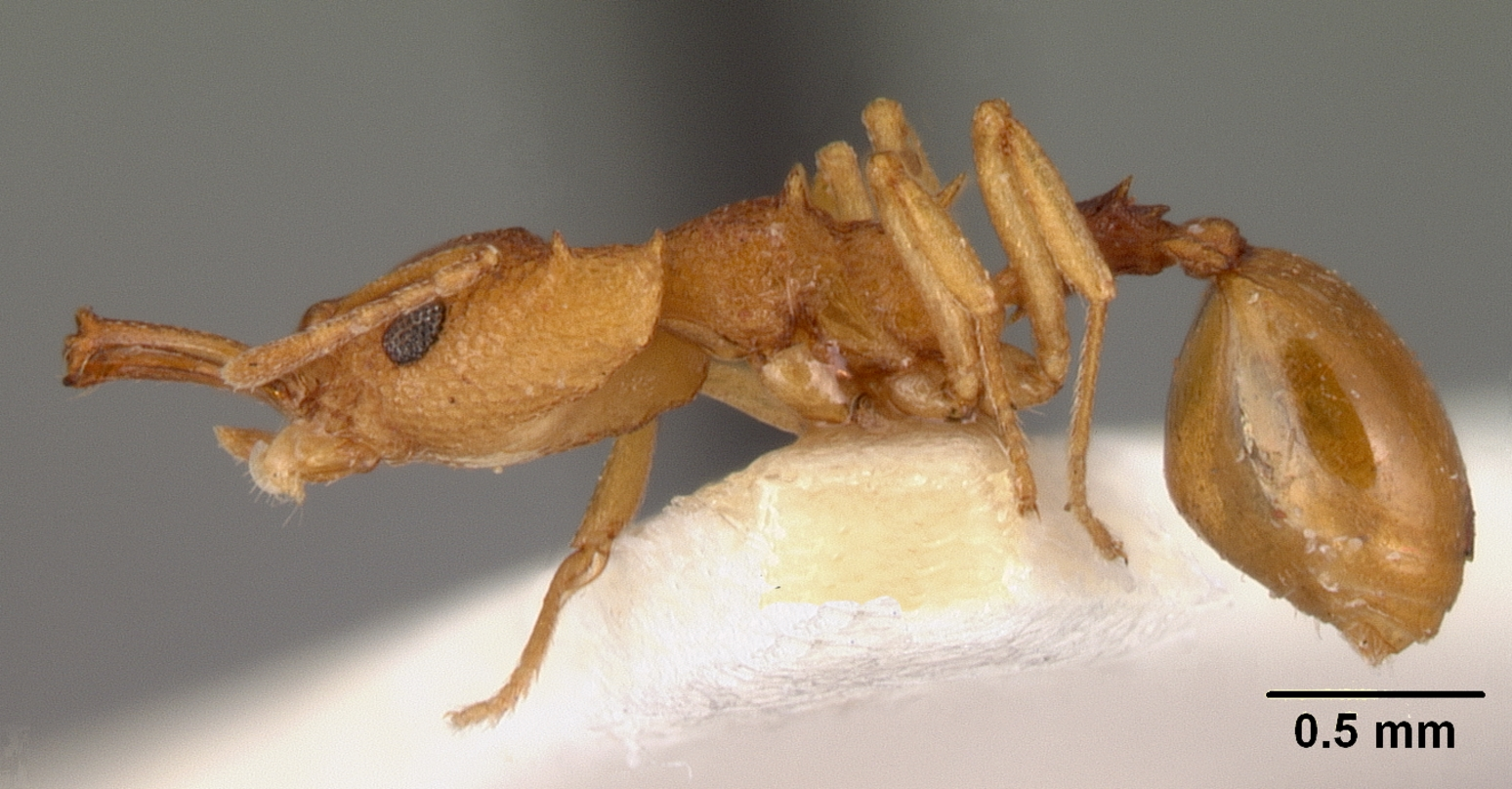
- Microdaceton exornatum worker

Scientific classification
- Domain: Eukaryota
- Kingdom: Animalia
- Phylum: Arthropoda
- Class: Insecta
- Order: Hymenoptera
- Family: Formicidae
- Subfamily: Myrmicinae
- Tribe: Attini
- Genus: Microdaceton; Santschi, 1913

Type species
- Microdaceton exornatum Santschi, 1913

Diversity
- 4 species

= Microdaceton =

Genus of ants

Microdaceton is an African genus of ants in the subfamily Myrmicinae. The genus consists of four species restricted to the Afrotropics. They nest in the leaf litter and seems to be fairly common. However, little is known about their biology.

== Species ==
- Microdaceton exornatum Santschi, 1913
- Microdaceton tanyspinosum Bolton, 2000
- Microdaceton tibialis Weber, 1952
- Microdaceton viriosum Bolton, 2000
