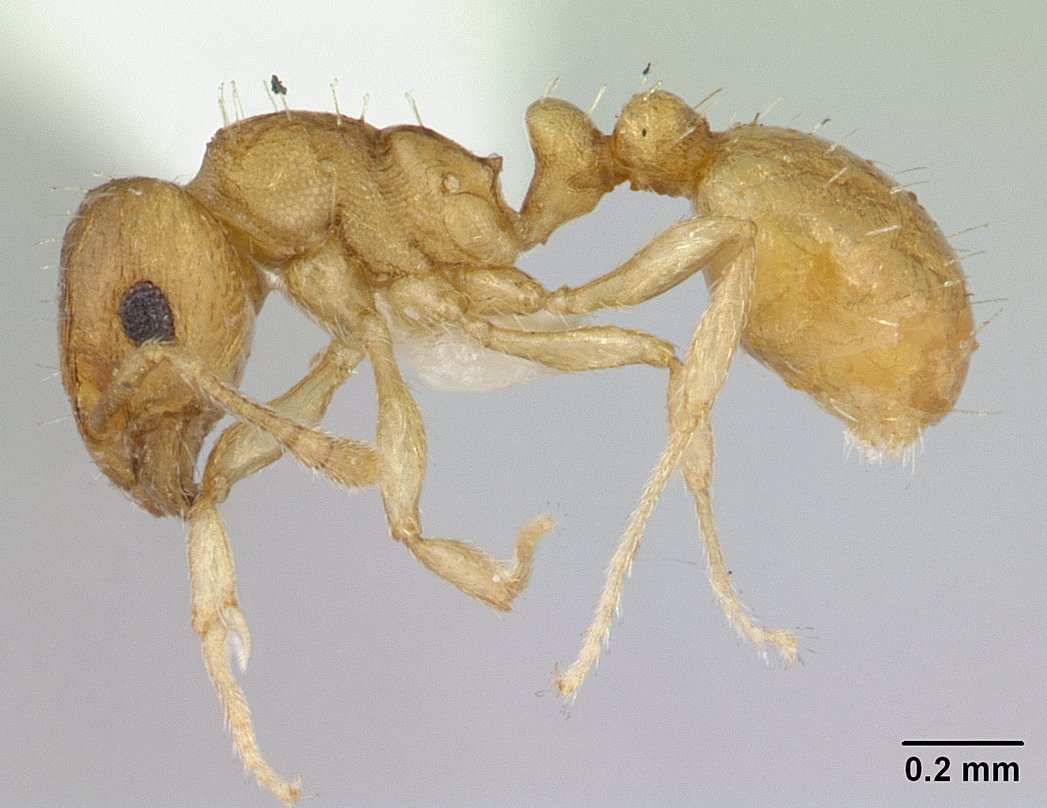
- Ochetomyrmex semipolitus worker

Scientific classification
- Domain: Eukaryota
- Kingdom: Animalia
- Phylum: Arthropoda
- Class: Insecta
- Order: Hymenoptera
- Family: Formicidae
- Subfamily: Myrmicinae
- Tribe: Attini
- Genus: Ochetomyrmex; Mayr, 1878

Type species
- Ochetomyrmex semipolitus Mayr, 1878

Diversity
- 2 species

= Ochetomyrmex =

Genus of ants

Ochetomyrmex is a Neotropical genus of ants in the subfamily Myrmicinae.

== Distribution ==
The genus is restricted to the Neotropical region, where the ants nest in soil or in the leaf litter. Ochetomyrmex neopolitus is known from northern South America, from Colombia and Guyana to the Brazilian Amazon. Ochetomyrmex semipolitus has a wider distribution, ranging from Guyana and Brazil to northern Argentina.

== Species ==
- Ochetomyrmex neopolitus Fernández, 2003
- Ochetomyrmex semipolitus Mayr, 1878
