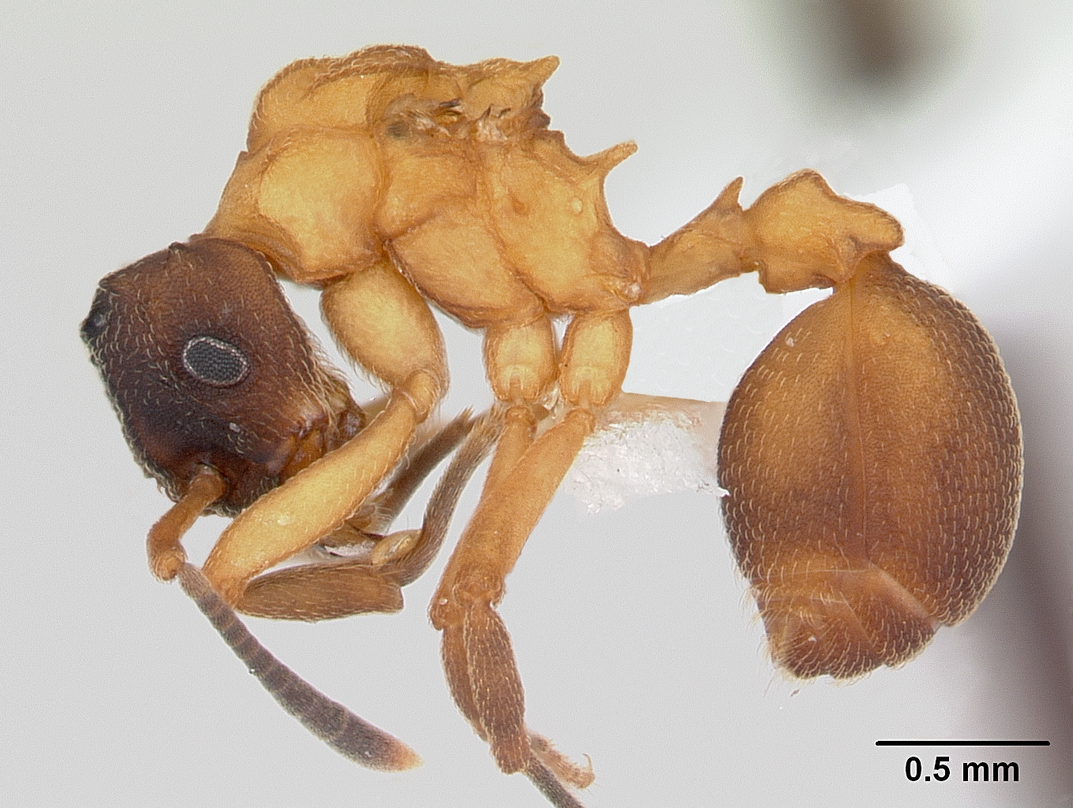
- Mycetarotes parallelus queen

Scientific classification
- Domain: Eukaryota
- Kingdom: Animalia
- Phylum: Arthropoda
- Class: Insecta
- Order: Hymenoptera
- Family: Formicidae
- Subfamily: Myrmicinae
- Tribe: Attini
- Genus: Mycetarotes; Emery, 1913

Type species
- Cyphomyrmex parallelus Emery, 1906

Diversity
- 4 species

= Mycetarotes =

Genus of ants

Mycetarotes is a genus of fungus-growing ants in the subfamily Myrmicinae.

== Species ==
- Mycetarotes acutus Mayhé-Nunes, 1995
- Mycetarotes carinatus Mayhé-Nunes, 1995
- Mycetarotes parallelus (Emery, 1906)
- Mycetarotes senticosus Kempf, 1960
