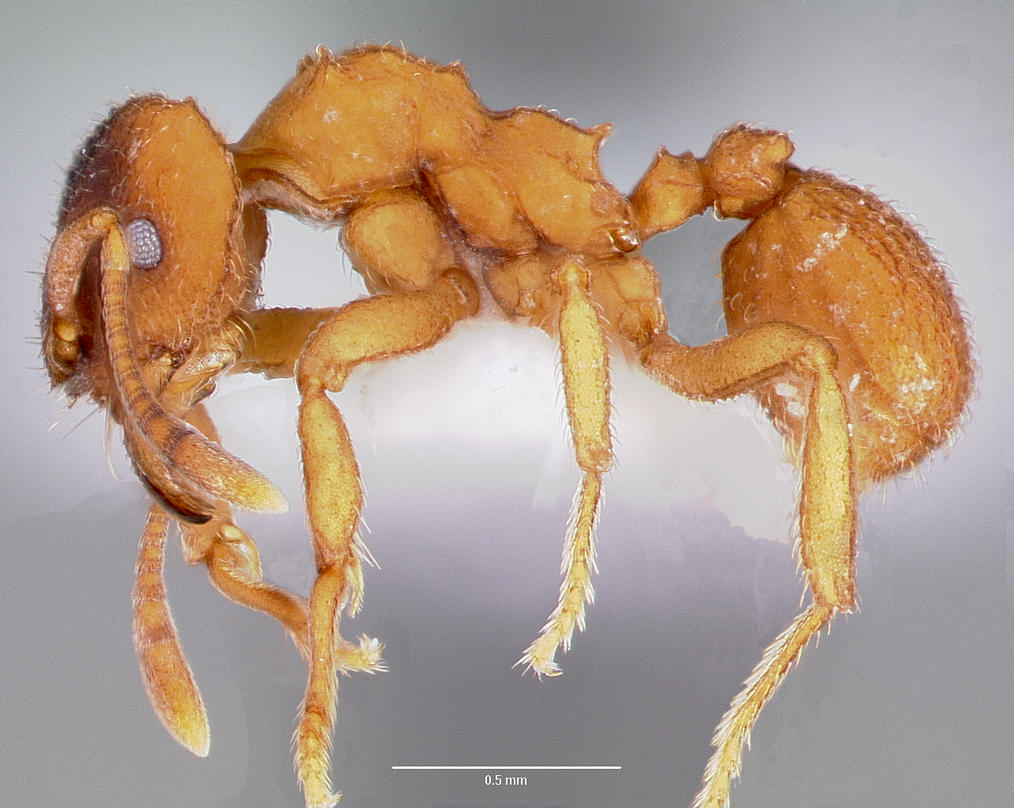
- Mycetosoritis hartmanni worker

Scientific classification
- Kingdom: Animalia
- Phylum: Arthropoda
- Class: Insecta
- Order: Hymenoptera
- Family: Formicidae
- Subfamily: Myrmicinae
- Tribe: Attini
- Genus: Mycetosoritis; Wheeler, 1907

Type species
- Atta hartmanni Wheeler, 1907

Diversity
- 5 species

= Mycetosoritis =

Genus of ants

Mycetosoritis is a genus of fungus-growing ants in the subfamily Myrmicinae.

== Species ==
- Mycetosoritis aspera (Mayr, 1887)
- Mycetosoritis clorindae (Kusnezov, 1949)
- Mycetosoritis explicata Kempf, 1968
- Mycetosoritis hartmanni (Wheeler, 1907)
- Mycetosoritis vinsoni Mackay, 1998
