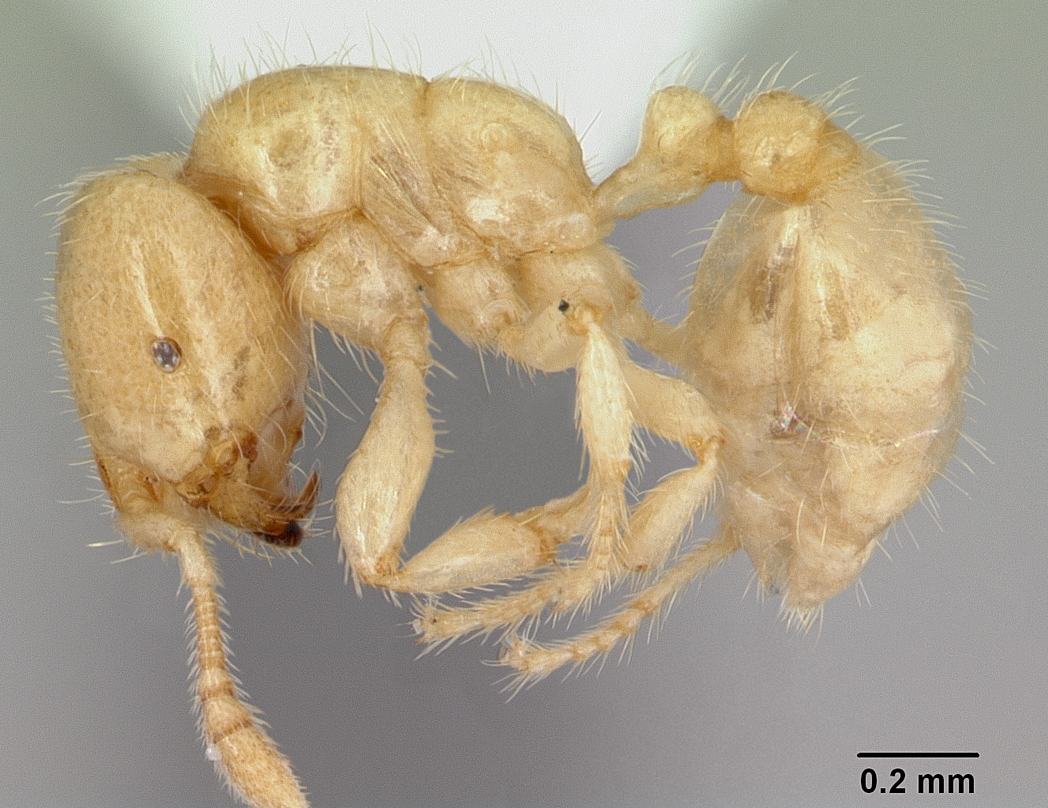
- Tranopelta gilva worker

Scientific classification
- Domain: Eukaryota
- Kingdom: Animalia
- Phylum: Arthropoda
- Class: Insecta
- Order: Hymenoptera
- Family: Formicidae
- Subfamily: Myrmicinae
- Tribe: Attini
- Genus: Tranopelta; Mayr, 1866

Type species
- Tranopelta gilva

Diversity
- 4 species

= Tranopelta =

Genus of ants

Tranopelta is a Neotropical genus of ants in the subfamily Myrmicinae.

== Distribution ==
The genus is restricted to the Neotropical region, where the ants nest in soil or in the leaf litter. Tranopelta gilva is known from Costa Rica to Brazil, Tranopelta subterranea is found in Ecuador, Bolivia and Brazil.

== Species ==
- Tranopelta gilva Mayr, 1866 (synonyms Tranopelta amblyops (Emery, 1894) Tranopelta heyeri (Forel, 1901))
- Tranopelta subterranea (Mann, 1916)
