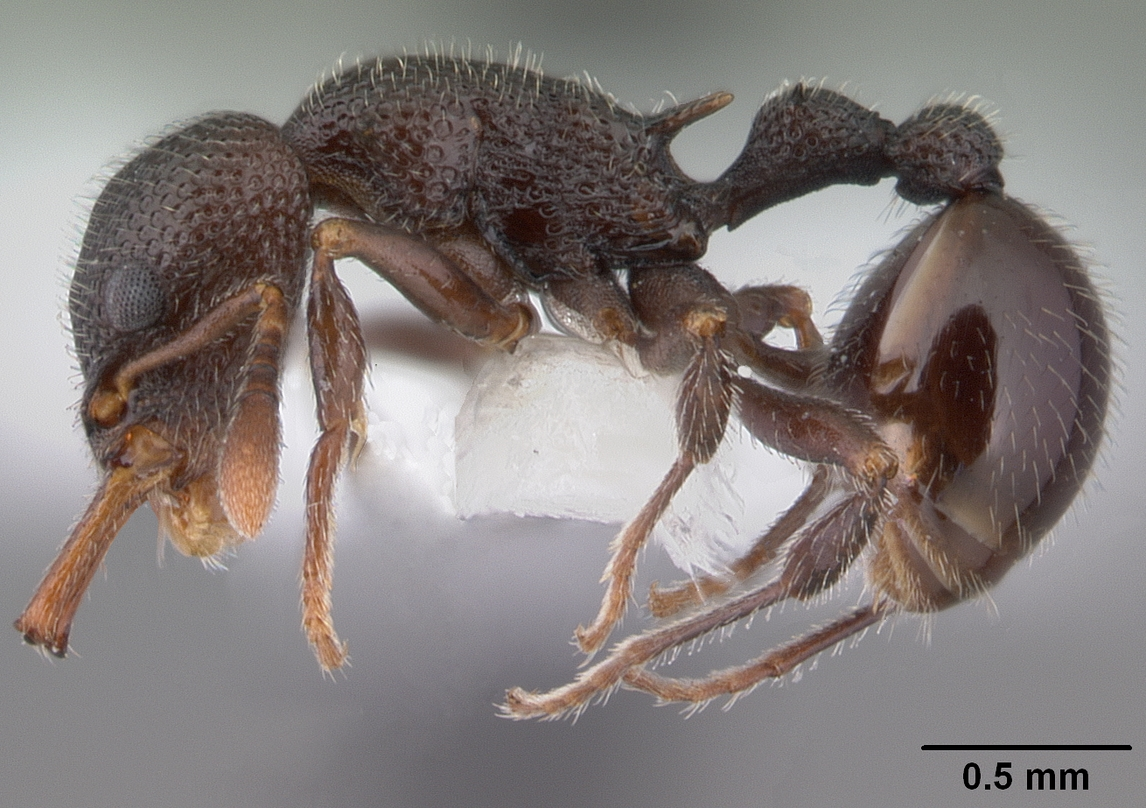
- Epopostruma natalae worker

Scientific classification
- Kingdom: Animalia
- Phylum: Arthropoda
- Class: Insecta
- Order: Hymenoptera
- Family: Formicidae
- Subfamily: Myrmicinae
- Tribe: Attini
- Genus: Epopostruma; Forel, 1895

Type species
- Strumigenys quadrispinosa Forel, 1895

Diversity
- 19 species

Synonyms
- Hexadaceton Brown, 1948

= Epopostruma =

Genus of ants

Epopostruma is a genus of ants in the subfamily Myrmicinae. It is restricted to Australia.

== Species ==
- Epopostruma alata Shattuck, 2000
- Epopostruma angela Shattuck, 2000
- Epopostruma angulata Shattuck, 2000
- Epopostruma areosylva Shattuck, 2000
- Epopostruma avicula Shattuck, 2000
- Epopostruma curiosa Shattuck, 2000
- Epopostruma frosti (Brown, 1948)
- Epopostruma infuscocephala Shattuck, 2000
- Epopostruma inornata Shattuck, 2007
- Epopostruma kangarooensis Shattuck, 2000
- Epopostruma lattini Shattuck, 2000
- Epopostruma mercurii Shattuck, 2000
- Epopostruma monstrosa Viehmeyer, 1925
- Epopostruma natalae Shattuck, 2000
- Epopostruma quadrispinosa (Forel, 1895)
- Epopostruma sowestensis Shattuck, 2000
- Epopostruma terrula Shattuck, 2000
- Epopostruma vitta Shattuck, 2000
- Epopostruma wardi Shattuck, 2000
