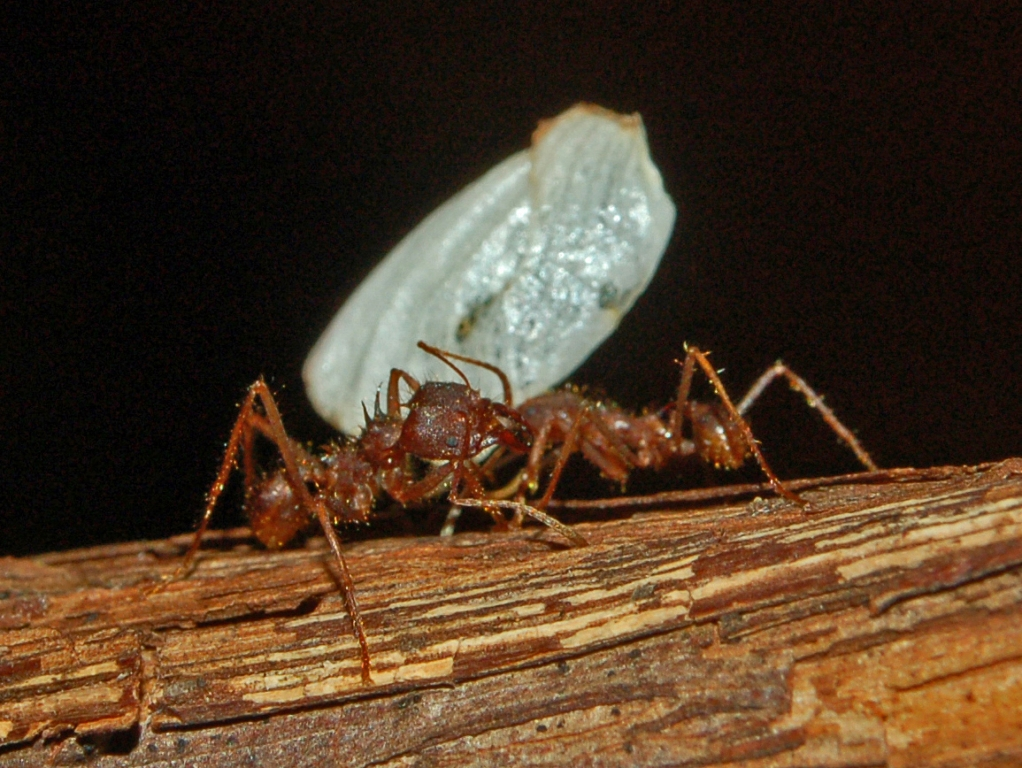
- Atta mexicana workers carrying a leaf section

Scientific classification
- Kingdom: Animalia
- Phylum: Arthropoda
- Clade: Pancrustacea
- Class: Insecta
- Order: Hymenoptera
- Family: Formicidae
- Subfamily: Myrmicinae
- Tribe: Attini; Smith, 1858

Type genus
- Atta Fabricius, 1804

Genera
- See text

Diversity
- 46 genera

= Fungus-growing ants =

Attini

Tribe of ants

Fungus-growing ants (tribe Attini) comprise all the known fungus-growing ant species participating in ant–fungus mutualism. They are known for cutting grasses and leaves, carrying them to their colonies' nests, and using them to grow fungus, on which they later feed.

Their farming habits typically have large effects on their surrounding ecosystem. Many species farm large areas surrounding their colonies and leave walking trails that compress the soil, which handicaps the growth of plants. Attine colonies commonly have millions of individuals, though some species only house a few hundred.

They are the sister group to the subtribe Dacetina. Leafcutter ants, including Atta and Acromyrmex, make up two of the genera. Their cultivars mostly come from the fungal tribe Leucocoprineae of family Agaricaceae.

Attine gut microbiota are often not diverse due to their primarily monotonous diets, leaving them at a higher risk than other beings for certain illnesses. They are especially at risk of death if their colony's fungal garden is affected by disease, as it is most often the only food source used for developing larvae. Many species of ants, including several Megalomyrmex, invade fungus-growing ant colonies and either steal from and destroy these fungal gardens, or they live in the nest and take food from the species.

Fungus-growing ants are only found in the Western Hemisphere. Some species stretch as far north as the pine barrens in New Jersey, USA (Trachymyrmex septentrionalis) and as far south as the cold deserts in Argentina (several species of Acromyrmex). This New World ant clade is thought to have originated about 60 million years ago in the South American rainforest. This is disputed, though, as they could have possibly evolved in a drier habitat while still evolving to domesticate their crops.

== Evolution ==
Early ancestors of attine ants were probably insect predators. They likely began foraging for leaf sections, but then converted their primary food source to the fungus these leaf cuts grew. Higher attines, such as Acromyrmex and Atta, are believed to have evolved in Central and North America about 20 million years ago (Mya), starting with Trachymyrmex cornetzi. While the fungal cultivars of the 'lower' attine ants can survive outside an ant colony, those of 'higher' attine ants are obligate mutualists.

Generalized fungus farming in ants appears to have evolved about 55–60 Mya, but early 25 Mya ants seemed to have domesticated a single fungal lineage with gongylidia to feed colonies. This evolution of using gongylidia appears to have developed in the dry habitats of South America, away from the rainforests where fungus-farming evolved. About 10 million years later, leaf-cutting ants likely arose as active herbivores and began industrial-scaled farming. The fungus the ants grew eventually became reproductively isolated and co-evolved with the ants. These fungi gradually began decomposing more nutritious material like fresh plant-material.

Shortly after attine ants began keeping their fungus gardens in dense aggregations, their farms likely began suffering from a specialized genus of Escovopsis, which are mycopathogens. The ants evolved cuticular cultures of Actinomycetota that suppress Escovopsis and possibly other bacteria. These cuticular cultures are both antibiotics and antifungals. The mature worker ants wear these cultures on their chest plates and sometimes on their surrounding thoraces and legs as a biofilm.

== Behavior ==
=== Mating ===
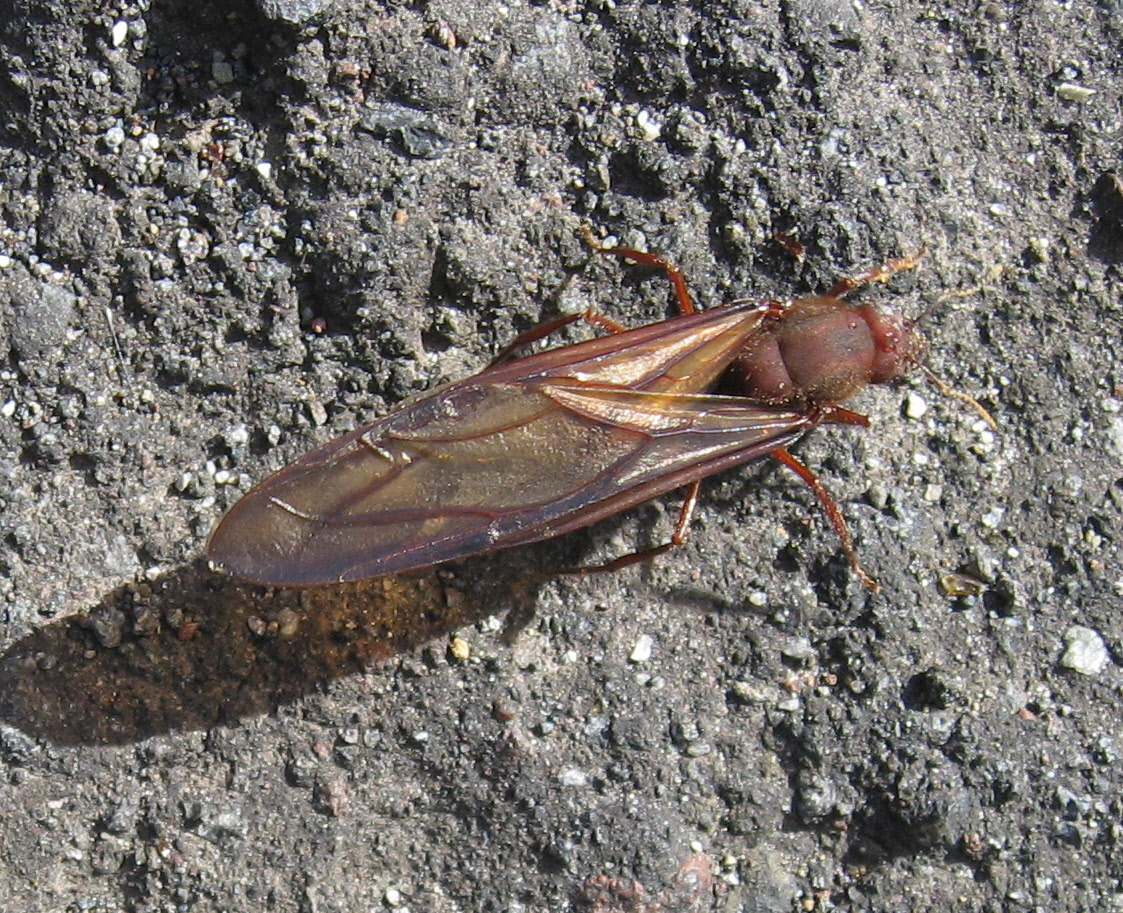
A still-winged fungus-growing alate

Typically, one queen ant lives per colony. Every year after the colony is about three years old, the queen lays eggs of female and male alates, the reproductive ants that will pass on the genes of the queens. Before leaving the nest, queens stuff some of the fungus' mycelia in her cibarium. These winged males and queens then take their nuptial flights to mate high in the air. In some areas, species flights are synchronized with all local colonies' virgin royalty flying at the same time on the same day, such as Atta sexdens and Atta texana.

Some species' queens mate with only one male, as in Seriomyrmex and Trachymyrmex, while some are known to mate with as many as eight or 10, such as Atta sexdens and many Acromyrmex species. After mating, all males die, but their sperm stays alive and usable for a long time in the spermatheca, or sperm bank, of their mate, meaning that many male ant's offspring hatch years after their death.

=== Colony foundation ===
After their mating flights, queens cast off their wings and begin their descent into the ground. After creating a narrow entrance and digging 20–30 cm (7.9–11.8 in) straight down, she creates a small 6 cm (2.4 in) chamber. In here, she spits on a small wad of fungus and starts her colony's fungal garden. After about three days, fresh mycelia are growing out of the fungus wad and the queen has lain three to six eggs. In a month, the colony has eggs, larvae, and often pupae surrounding the ever-growing garden.

Until the first workers have matured, the ant queen is the sole worker. She grows the garden, fertilizing it with her fecal liquid, but does not eat from it. Instead, she gains energy from eating 90% of the eggs she lays, in addition to catabolizing her wing muscles and fat reserves.

Though the first larvae feed on the eggs of the queen, the first workers begin growing and eating from the garden. Workers feed malformed eggs to the hungry larvae while the garden is still fragile. After about a week of this underground growth, workers open the closed entrance and begin foraging, staying close to the nest. The fungus begins growing at a much faster rate [13 μm (0.00051 in) per hour]. From this point on, the only work the queen does is egg-laying.

Colonies grow slowly for the first two years of existence, but then accelerate for the next three years. After around five years, growth levels out and the colony begins to produce winged males and queens.

The founding of a nest by these queens is highly difficult, and successful cases are not likely. After three months, newly founded colonies of Atta capiguara and Atta sexdens are 0.09% and 2.53% likely to still exist, respectively. Some species have better odds, such as Atta cephalotes, which are 10% likely to survive a few months.

== Caste system ==
Attines have seven castes performing roughly 20–30 tasks, meaning the potential exists for development of more specialized castes performing individual tasks for Atta's future. For now, a reproductive caste, made of male drones and female queens, and a worker class, that vary greatly in size, are known. Queens have much larger ovaries than females in the working castes. Since their needs are constantly taken care of, queens rarely move from a single location, which is typically in a centralized fungal garden. Workers take their eggs and move them to other fungal gardens. Differences in size between worker castes begin to develop after a colony is well established.

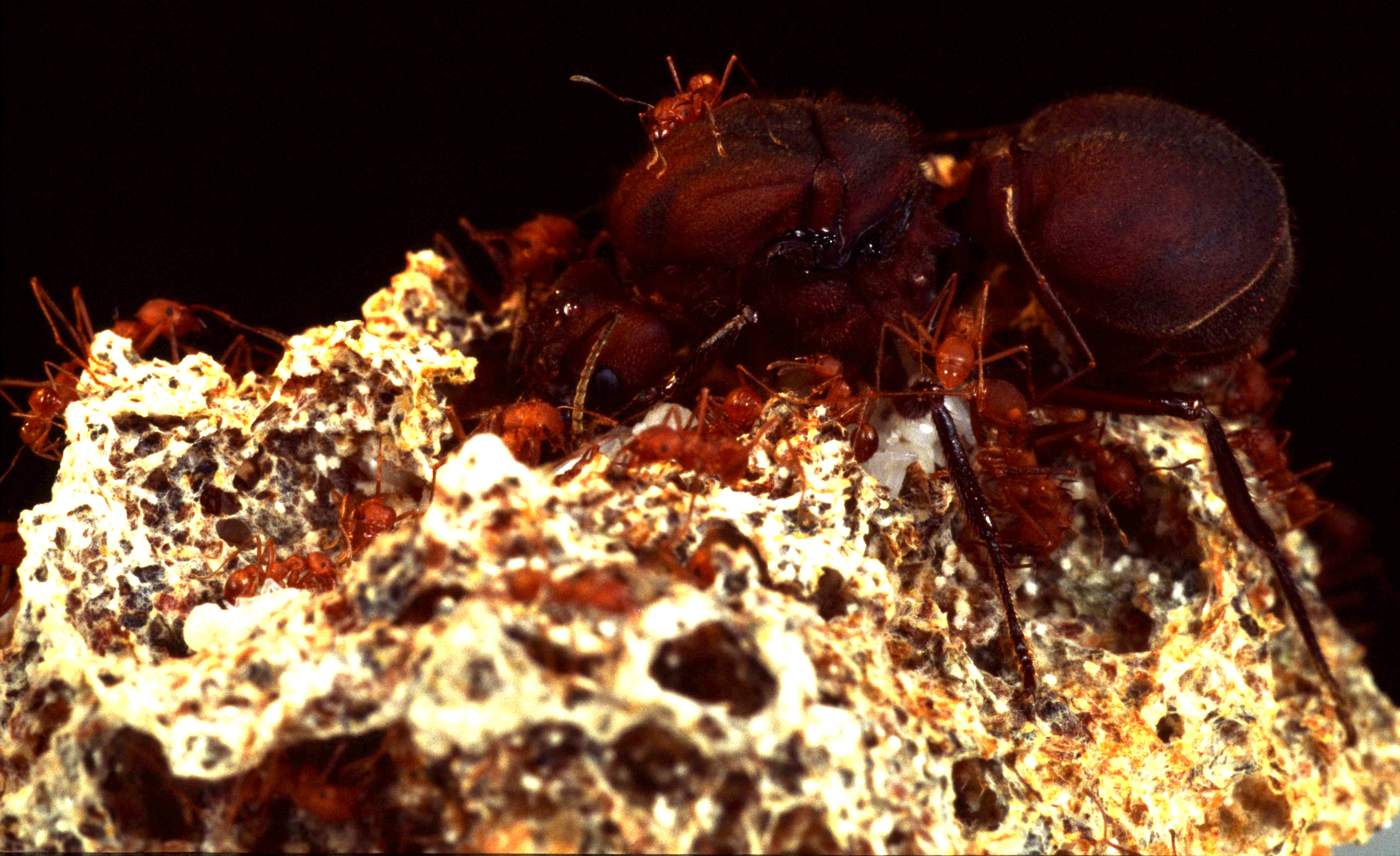
An Atta colombica queen surrounded by workers in a fungus garden

=== Workers ===
==== Description ====
Lower attines have very minor polymorphism within the minor workers, though higher attines commonly have very different sizes of worker ants. In the higher attines, though, head width varies eight-fold and dry weight 200-fold between different castes of workers. The size differences in workers is nearly nonexistent in newly founded colonies.

Due to the variety of tasks needed to be performed by a colony, the widths of workers heads are important and good measures of what jobs workers are likely to perform. Those with the heads about 0.8–1.0 mm (0.031–0.039 in) wide tend to work as gardeners, although many with heads 0.8–1.6 mm (0.031–0.063 in) wide participate in brood care.

Workers need heads only about 0.8 mm wide to do the work of caring for the very delicate hyphae of the fungus, which they care for by stroking with their antennae and moving with their mouths. These tiny workers are the smallest and most abundant and are called minim. Ants of 1.6 mm (0.063 in) appear to be the smallest workers that cut vegetation, but they cannot cut very hard or thick leaves. Most foragers have heads around 2.0–2.2 mm (0.079–0.087 in) wide.

Attines, particularly the workers that cut leaves and grass, have large mandibles powered by strong muscles. On average, 50% of worker ants' head mass and 25% of their full body mass is the mandibular muscles alone.

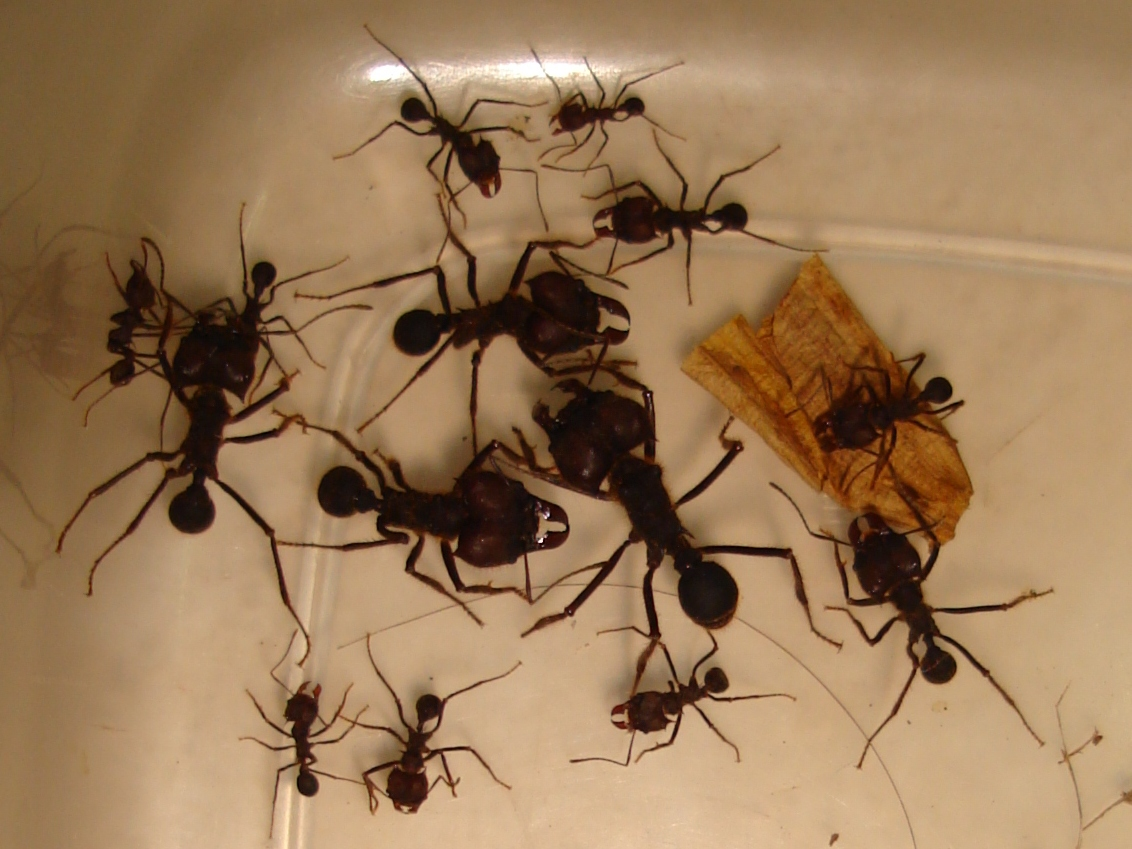
Different sizes of Atta insularis workers demonstrating the common polymorphism of higher attines

==== Behavior ====
Though all castes defend their nests in the event of invasion, a true soldier caste, with individuals called majors, exists. They are larger than other workers, and use their large, sharp mandibles, powered by huge adductor muscles, to defend their colonies from large enemies, such as vertebrates. When a foraging area is threatened by conspecific or interspecific ant competitor, the majority of respondents are smaller workers from other castes, since they are more numerous, and therefore better suited for territorial combat.

Tasks are divided not only by size, but by the age of individuals workers, as well. Young workers of most subcastes tend to work inside the nest, but many older workers take on tasks outside. Minims, which are too small to cut or carry leaf fragments, are commonly found at foraging sites. They often ride from the foraging site to the nest by climbing onto the fragments carried by other workers. Most likely, they are older workers that defend carriers from parasitic phorid flies that attempt to lay eggs on the backs of the foragers.

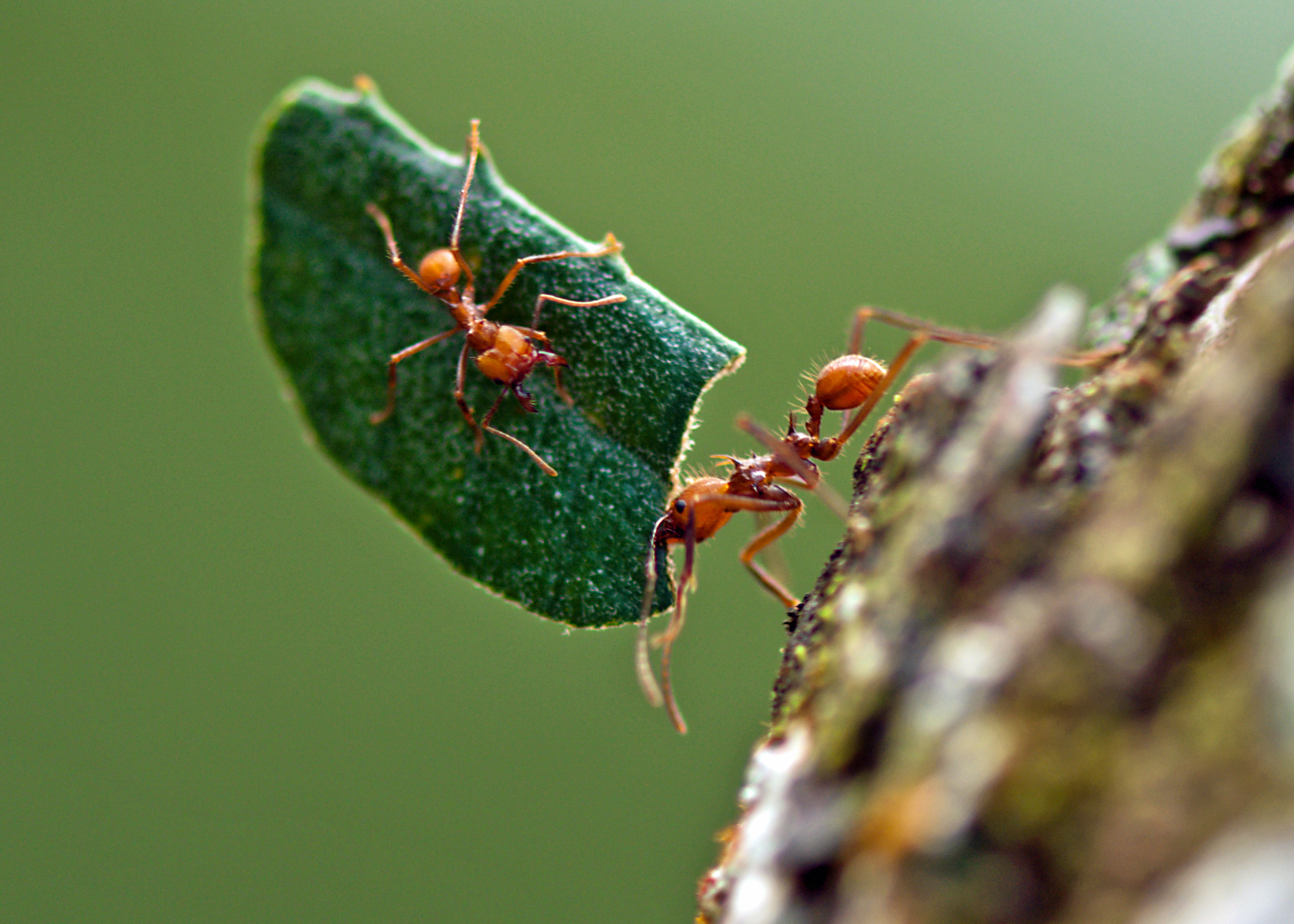
Smaller worker riding back to the nest on a leaf fragment carried by a forager

All size groups defend their colonies from invaders, but older workers have been found to attack and defend territories most often. At least three of four physical castes of A. sexdens change their behavior based on their age.

== Habitat ==
Lower attines mostly live in inconspicuous nests with 100–1000 individuals and relatively small fungus gardens in them. Higher attines, in contrast, live in colonies made of 5–10 million ants that live and work within hundreds of interconnected fungus-bearing chambers in huge subterranean nests. Some colonies are so large, they can be seen from satellite photos, measuring up to 600 m^{3} (21,000 ft^{3}).

== Farming ==
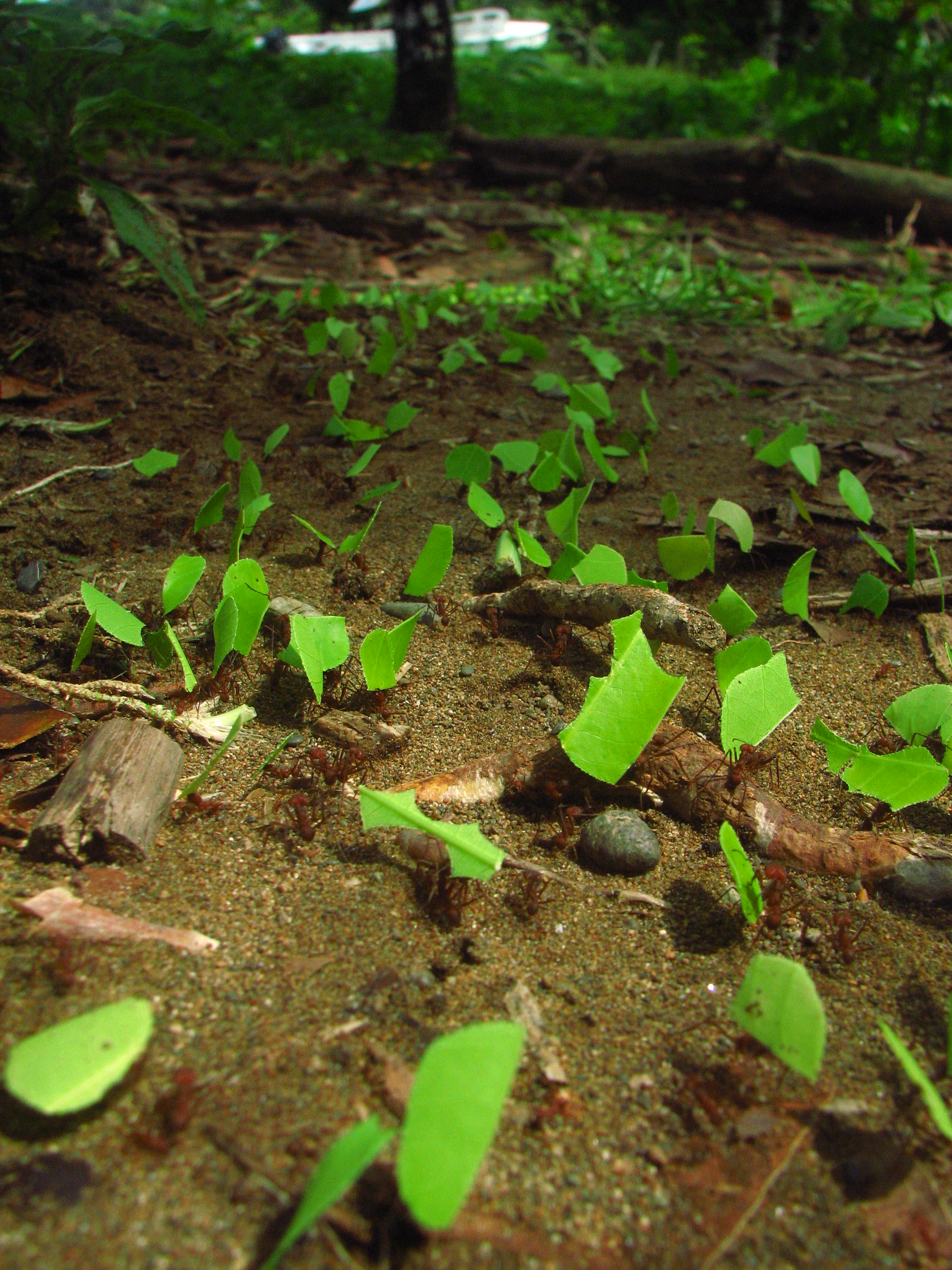
Workers carrying leaf fragments

The majority of fungi that are farmed by attine ants come from the family Agaricaceae, mostly from the genera Leucoagaricus and Leucocoprinus, though variance occurs within the tribe. Some species in the genus Apterostigma have changed their food source to fungi in the family Tricholomataceae. Some species cultivate yeast, such as Cyphomyrmex rimosus.

Some fungi that have supposedly been vertically transmitted are believed to be millions of years old. It was previously assumed that the cultures are always transmitted vertically from colony to young queen, but some lower attines have been found to be growing recently domesticated Lepiotaceae. Some species transfer cultures laterally, such as Cyphomyrmex and occasionally some species of Acromyrmex, whether by joining a neighboring tribe, stealing, or invading another colony's garden.

A leafcutter worker taking a leaf to its colony

Lower attines do not use leaves for the majority of the substrate for their gardens, and instead prefer dead vegetation, seeds, fruits, insect feces, and corpses. The lower attine ant species Mycocepurus goeldii has been found to farm Leucocoprinus attinorum whilst the sand dwelling Mycetophylax morschi farms the closely related species Leucocoprinus dunensis. Apterostigma dentigerum cultivates Myrmecopterula velohortorum in veiled hanging gardens whereas Apterostigma manni cultivates Myrmecopterula nudihortorum in spongelike masses in cavities in the ground or under logs.

=== Worker recruitment ===
The number of ants that are recruited to cut varies greatly based on the leaf quality available in addition to the species and location of the colony. Leaf quality is complex to measure because many variables exist, including "leaf tenderness, nutrient composition, and the presence and quantity of secondary plant chemicals" such as sugar.

Early studies found the pheromones used to mark foraging trails come from poison gland sacs. Studies suggest there are two purposes for marking the trails this way: worker recruitment and orientation cues. The trail recruitment pheromone methyl-4-methylpyrrole-2-carboxylate (MMPC), was the first whose chemical structure was identified. It is also the main trail recruitment pheromone in all Atta species except Atta sexdens, which uses 3-ethyl-2,5-dimethylpyrazine.

MMPC is incredibly potent and effective at attracting ants. One milligram is theoretically powerful enough to create a path that A. texana and A. cephalotes would follow three times the Earth's circumference [74,703 miles (120,223 km)] and that 50% of A. vollenweideri foragers would follow 60 times around the Earth [1,494,060 miles (2,404,460 km)].

=== Harvesting vegetation ===
Most harvesting sites are in tree canopies or patches of savanna grasses.

After following the pheromone trail to vegetation, ants climb onto leaves or grass and begin cutting off sections. To do this, they place one mandible, called the fixed mandible, onto a leaf and anchor it. Then they open the other, called the motile mandible, and place it on the leaf tissue. The ant moves the motile jaw and pulls the fixed jaw behind it by closing them together until the fragment detaches. Which jaw is fixed and which is motile varies depending on the direction in which the ant chooses to cut a fragment.

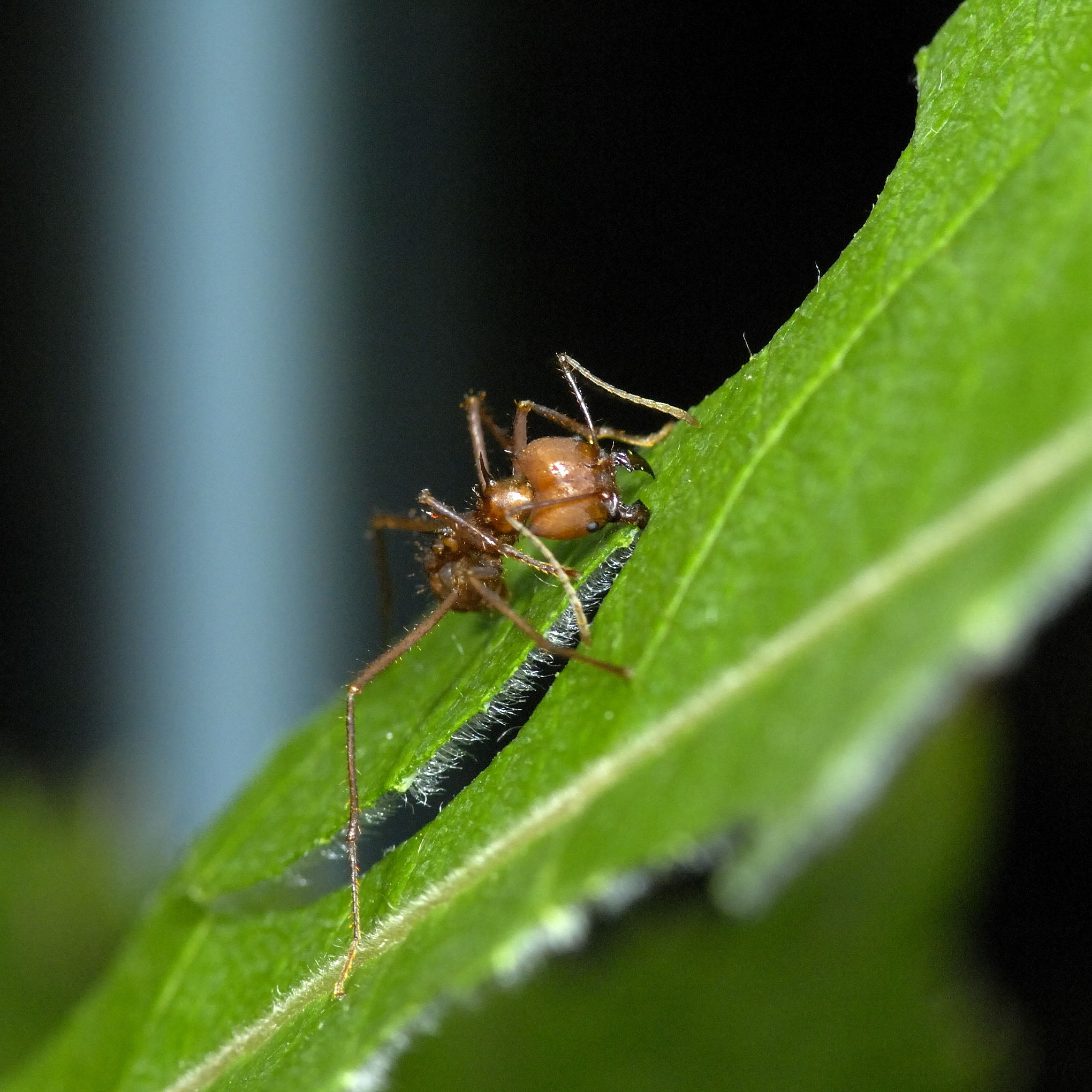
An A. colombica worker using its mandibles to cut a leaf

The sizes of leaf fragments have been found in some studies to vary based on the size of ants due to the ants' anchoring of their hind legs while cutting, though other studies have not found correlations. This is likely because many factors affect how ants cut leaves, including neck flexibility, body axis location, and leg length. Load sizes that do not impact the running speed of the collecting ants are favored.

Often, ants stridulate while cutting vegetation by raising and lowering their gasters in a way that makes a cuticular file on the first gastric tergite and a scraper on the postpetiole rub together. This makes a noise, audible by people with great hearing sitting very close to them and visible using laser-Doppler vibrometry. It also causes the mandibles to move like a vibratome and cut through tender leaf tissue more smoothly.

The metabolic rate of the ants while and after cutting vegetation is above standard. Their aerobic scope is in the range of flying insects, which are among the most metabolically active animals.

The behavior of the foragers that bring the material back to the nest varies greatly among species. In some species, especially those that harvest close to their nests, the harvesters bring the litter back to their colony themselves. Species such as A. colombica have one or more cache sites along a trail for foragers to grab litter. Other species, such as A. vollenweideri, that carry leaves as far as 150 m (490 ft), have two to five carriers per leaf. The first carrier takes the segment a short distance toward the nest and then drops it. Another picks it up and drops it, and this repeats until the last carrier brings it the greatest distance until reaching the nest. Data does not show that this behavior maximizes load transportation, so scientists have explained this behavior in other ways, though the data are still inconclusive. One theory is that this type of task partitioning increases the efficiency of individual workers as they become specialists. Another is that the chains accelerate communication between ants about the quality and species of the plants being cut, recruits more workers, and reinforces territorial claims by reinforcing the scent markings.

=== Gardening process ===
First, foragers bring in to and drop leaf fragments on the nest's chamber floor. Workers that are usually slightly smaller clip these pieces into segments that are about 1–2 mm (0.039–0.079 in) across. Smaller ants then crush these fragments and mold them into damp pellets by adding fecal droplets and kneading them. They add the pellets into a larger pile of other prill.

Smaller workers then pluck loose strands of fungus from dense patches and plant them on the surface of the freshly made pile. The smallest workers, the minim, move around and keep up the garden by delicately prodding the piles with their antennae, licking the surfaces, and plucking out the spores and hyphae of unwanted mold species.

=== Nutrition ===
Higher attine fungi grow gongylidia, which form clusters called staphylae. The staphylae are rich in carbohydrates and lipids. Though workers can also eat the hyphae of the fungi, which is richer in protein, they prefer staphylae and appear to live longer while eating them.

Cellulose has been found to be poorly degraded and assimilated by fungus, if at all, meaning that the ants that eat the fungus do not get much energy from the cellulose in plants. Xylan, starch, maltose, sucrose, laminarin, and glycoside apparently play the important roles in ant nutrition. It is not known yet how ants can digest laminarin, but myrmecologists E.O. Wilson and Bert Hölldobler hypothesize that fungal enzymes may occur in the ants' guts, as evidenced by the enzymes found in larval extract.

In a laboratory experiment, only 5% of workers' energy needs were met by fungal staphylae, and the ants also feed on tree sap as they collect greens. Larvae seem to grow on all or nearly all fungi, whereas queens obtain their energy from the eggs nonqueen females lay and workers feed to them.

=== Bacterial symbionts ===
Aside from the fungal symbionts that they grow, the attine also have a symbiotic relationship with the actinomycete bacterium Pseudonocardia. Pseudonocardia has been identified as a defensive symbiont for the Attinae ants. It is a filamentous and sporulating bacteria that grows slowly in aerobic conditions. Pseudonocardia spp. has a global distribution but is primarily studied for its role in fungal farming. It is usually transmitted vertically meaning that it is passed from the mother to the offspring. Like the fungus, virgin queens take a culture of the bacterial symbiont that they then pass to their new workers when establishing a colony. However, this relationship has not always existed and can be gained or lost in the attine phylogeny.

Pseudonocardia lives on the cuticles of the ants near exocrine glands. In the past, the cuticle was described to have a waxy or crusty layer but it wasn't until it was examined closer that it was identified as a bacterial biofilm. The ants provide nutrients and the Pseudonocardia works in a defensive capacity against Escovopsis which is a fungal pathogen of the fungus the ants farm. Depending on the species, there is a range in the types of anti-fungal compounds that can be produced that may not be specific to Escovopsis but is an area of ongoing research. The compounds seem to be applied during the process of grooming of the fungal cultivars leading to their selection. In addition to the anti-fungal compounds, there is some evidence that the Pseudonocardia also produces anti-bacterial compounds. This is suggested to confer a competitive advantage between different bacteria and species of the Pseudonocardia. Additionally, the production of antimicrobial compounds (both anti-fungal and anti-bacterial), may be tied to specific metabolic gene clusters that can be shared horizontally. By picking up these genetic tools from other actinomycetes, the native Pseudonocardia may be outcompeting and maintaining their symbiotic relationship.

=== Impact of farming ===
The scale of the farming done by fungus-farming ants can be compared to human's industrialized farming. A colony can "[defoliate] a mature eucalyptus tree overnight". The cutting of leaves to grow fungus to feed millions of ants per colony has a large ecological impact in the subtropical areas in which they reside.

Leafcutters transporting yellow flowers

== Genera ==
=== Extant ===
- Acanthognathus Mayr, 1887
- Acromyrmex Mayr, 1865
- Allomerus Mayr, 1878
- Amoimyrmex Cristiano et al., 2020
- Apterostigma Mayr, 1865
- Atta Fabricius, 1804
- Basiceros Schulz, 1906
- Blepharidatta Wheeler, 1915
- Cephalotes Latreille, 1802
- Chimaeridris Wilson, 1989
- Colobostruma Wheeler, 1927
- Cyatta Sosa-Calvo et al., 2013
- Cyphomyrmex Mayr, 1862
- Daceton Perty, 1833
- Diaphoromyrma Fernández et al., 2009
- Epopostruma Forel, 1895
- Eurhopalothrix Brown & Kempf, 1961
- Ishakidris Bolton, 1984
- Kalathomyrmex Klingenberg & Brandão, 2009
- Lachnomyrmex Wheeler, 1910
- Lenomyrmex Fernández & Palacio, 1999
- Mesostruma Brown, 1948
- Microdaceton Santschi, 1913
- Mycetagroicus Brandão & Mayhé-Nunes, 2001
- Mycetarotes Emery, 1913
- Mycetomoellerius Solomon et al., 2019
- Mycetophylax Emery, 1913
- Mycetosoritis Wheeler, 1907
- Mycocepurus Forel, 1893
- Myrmicocrypta Smith, 1860
- Ochetomyrmex Mayr, 1878
- Octostruma Forel, 1912
- Orectognathus Smith, 1853
- Paramycetophylax Kusnezov, 1956
- Phalacromyrmex Kempf, 1960
- Pheidole Westwood, 1839
- Pilotrochus Brown, 1978
- Procryptocerus Emery, 1887
- Protalaridris Brown, 1980
- Pseudoatta Gallardo, 1916
- Rhopalothrix Mayr, 1870
- Sericomyrmex Mayr, 1865
- Strumigenys Smith, 1860
- Talaridris Weber, 1941
- Trachymyrmex Forel, 1893
- Tranopelta Mayr, 1866
- Xerolitor Sosa-Calvo et al., 2018

=== Extinct ===
- †Attaichnus Laza, 1982 (trace fossil)

== See also ==
- Ant–fungus mutualism
- Fungus-growing termites
- List of leafcutter ants
- Leucoagaricus gongylophorus
- Myrmecopterula
- Non-human agriculture
