= Leucocoprinus attinorum =

Scientific classification
- Domain: Eukaryota
- Kingdom: Fungi
- Division: Basidiomycota
- Class: Agaricomycetes
- Order: Agaricales
- Family: Agaricaceae
- Genus: Leucocoprinus
- Species: L. attinorum

Binomial name
- Leucocoprinus attinorum S. Urrea-Valencia, A. Rodrigues & R.J. Bizarria (2023)

Species of fungus

Leucocoprinus attinorum Mycological characteristics
- Gills on hymenium
- Cap is campanulate or flat
- Hymenium is free
- Stipe has a ring
- Spore print is white
- Ecology is saprotrophic
- Edibility is unknown

Leucocoprinus attinorum is a species of mushroom-producing fungus in the family Agaricaceae.

== Taxonomy ==
It was described in 2023 by the mycologists Salomé Urrea‑Valencia, Rodolfo Bizarria Júnior, Pepijn W. Kooij, Quimi Vidaurre Montoya and Andre Rodrigues who conducted a study on fungal species cultivated by lower attine ants which described the new species Leucocoprinus attinorum and L. dunensis.

== Description ==
Leucocoprinus attinorum is a fungus cultivated by Mycocepurus goeldii ants.

Cap: 3-4cm wide, starting campanulate before expanding to applanate with age. The surface is coated in small brown scales with a darker brown centre disc. Gills: Free with a collar, crowded and whitish. Stem: 2.5-8cm long and 4-8mm thick with a slightly bulbous base but otherwise generally consistent thickness across the length and solid inner flesh. The surface light brown and is coated in fine fibrils but turns dark brown when bruised or touched. The movable stem ring is white with a dark brown margin of a similar colour to the cap centre. Spore print: Pale white. Spores: 7-8 x 5-6 (6.5) μm. Ellipsoid to amygdaliform with a rounded apex and germ pore covered with a hyaline cap. Smooth, thick walled and hyaline with no colour change in KOH. Congophilous, dextrinoid, metachromatic in cresyl blue. Basidia: 22-30 x 10-11 μm. Clavate, 4-spored, hyaline.

== Etymology ==
The specific epithet attinorum is named in reference to the subtribe Attina to which the Mycocepurus goeldii ants belong.

== Habitat and distribution ==
The species is cultivated by the fungus farming ant species Mycocepurus goeldii, the geographical range of which includes Brazil, parts of Bolivia, Paraguay and Northern Argentina. so this fungus may possibly extend over this same range.
