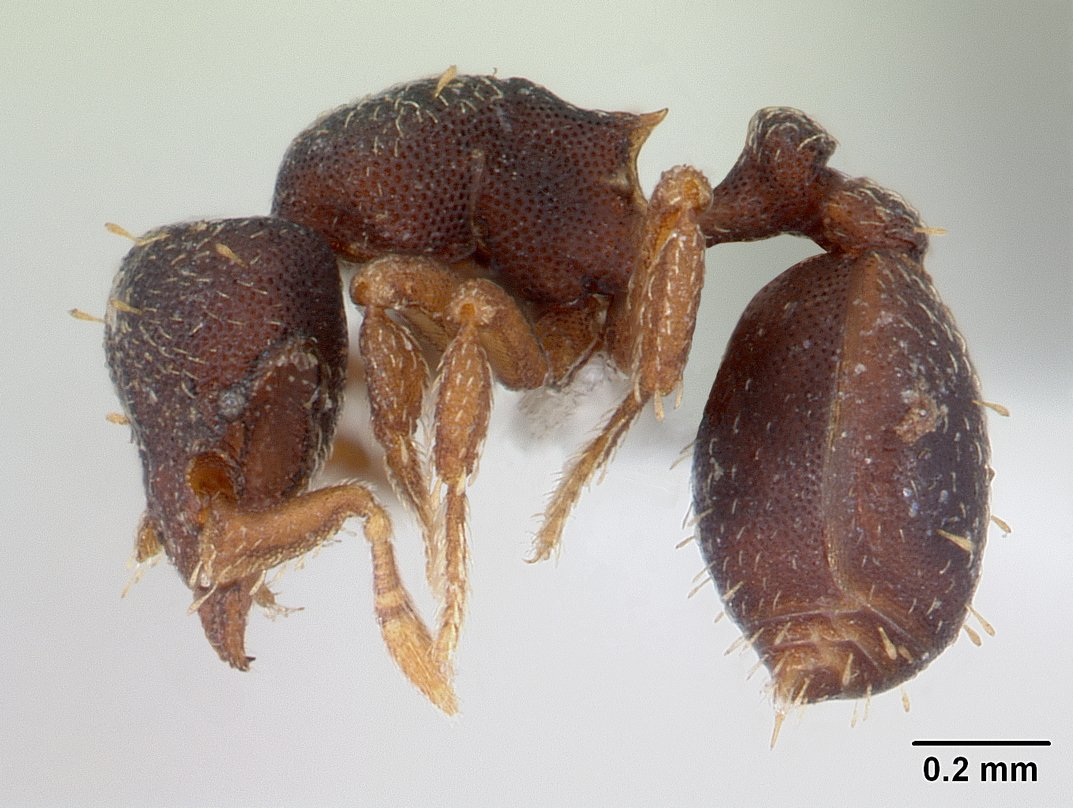
- O. balzani worker from Venezuela

Scientific classification
- Domain: Eukaryota
- Kingdom: Animalia
- Phylum: Arthropoda
- Class: Insecta
- Order: Hymenoptera
- Family: Formicidae
- Subfamily: Myrmicinae
- Tribe: Attini
- Genus: Octostruma; Forel, 1912

Type species
- Rhopalothrix simoni Emery, 1890

Diversity
- 34 species

= Octostruma =

Genus of ants

Octostruma is a genus of ants in the subfamily Myrmicinae. The genus is found in the Neotropics.

== Species ==
- Octostruma amrishi (Makhan, 2007)
- Octostruma ascrobicula Longino, 2013
- Octostruma ascrobis Longino, 2013
- Octostruma balzani (Emery, 1894)
- Octostruma batesi (Emery, 1894)
- Octostruma betschi Perrault, 1988
- Octostruma convallis Longino, 2013
- Octostruma convallisur Longino, 2013
- Octostruma cyrtinotum Longino, 2013
- Octostruma excertirugis Longino, 2013
- Octostruma gymnogon Longino, 2013
- Octostruma gymnosoma Longino, 2013
- Octostruma iheringi (Emery, 1888)
- Octostruma impressa Palacio, 1997
- Octostruma inca Brown & Kempf, 1960
- Octostruma leptoceps Longino, 2013
- Octostruma limbifrons Longino, 2013
- Octostruma lutzi (Wheeler, 1913)
- Octostruma megabalzani Longino, 2013
- Octostruma montanis Longino, 2013
- Octostruma obtusidens Longino, 2013
- Octostruma onorei (Baroni Urbani & De Andrade, 2007)
- Octostruma petiolata (Mayr, 1887)
- Octostruma pexidorsum Longino, 2013
- Octostruma planities Longino, 2013
- Octostruma reducta (Donisthorpe, 1939)
- Octostruma rugifera (Mayr, 1887)
- Octostruma rugiferoides Brown & Kempf, 1960
- Octostruma schusteri Longino, 2013
- Octostruma stenognatha Brown & Kempf, 1960
- Octostruma stenoscapa Palacio, 1997
- Octostruma triangulabrum Longino, 2013
- Octostruma triquetrilabrum Longino, 2013
- Octostruma trithrix Longino, 2013
- Octostruma wheeleri (Mann, 1922)
