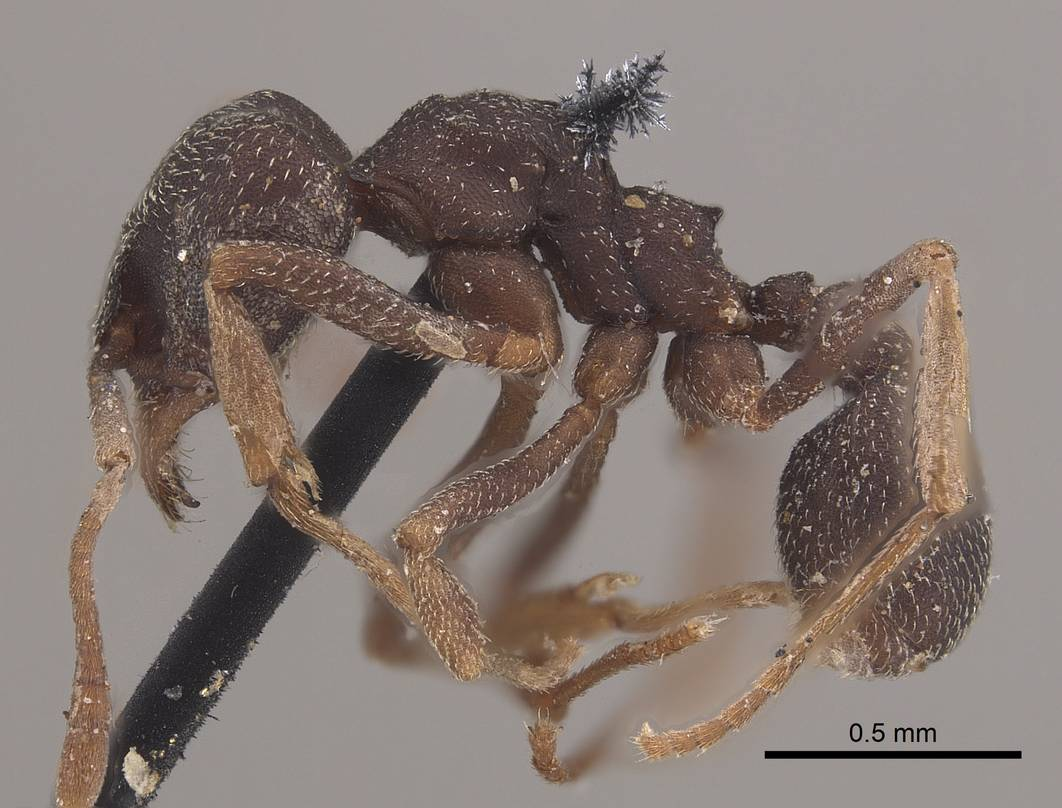
- Mycetophylax conformis worker

Scientific classification
- Domain: Eukaryota
- Kingdom: Animalia
- Phylum: Arthropoda
- Class: Insecta
- Order: Hymenoptera
- Family: Formicidae
- Subfamily: Myrmicinae
- Tribe: Attini
- Genus: Mycetophylax; Emery, 1913

Type species
- Myrmicocrypta brittoni

Diversity
- 21 species

= Mycetophylax =

Genus of ants

Mycetophylax is a genus of fungus-growing ants. The genus is characterized exclusively for the New World and is only found on coastal sandy beaches and shallow waters of Brazil.

== Species ==
- Mycetophylax andersoni
- Mycetophylax asper
- Mycetophylax auritus
- Mycetophylax bigibbosus
- Mycetophylax bruchi
- Mycetophylax clorindae
- Mycetophylax conformis (Mayr, 1884)
- Mycetophylax daguerrei
- Mycetophylax faunulus
- Mycetophylax lectus
- Mycetophylax lilloanus
- Mycetophylax morschi (Emery, 1888)
- Mycetophylax nemei
- Mycetophylax occultus
- Mycetophylax olitor
- Mycetophylax paniscus
- Mycetophylax plaumanni
- Mycetophylax simplex (Emery, 1888)
- Mycetophylax snellingi
- Mycetophylax strigatus
- Mycetophylax vallensis
