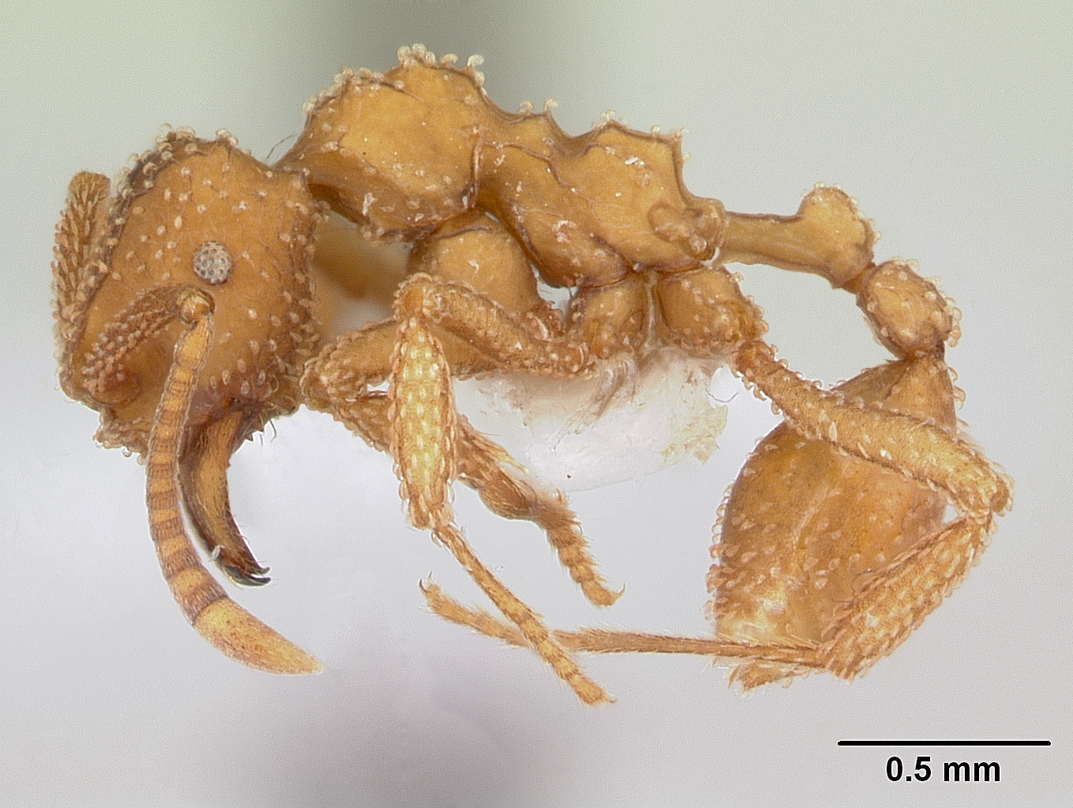
- Myrmicocrypta squamosa

Scientific classification
- Domain: Eukaryota
- Kingdom: Animalia
- Phylum: Arthropoda
- Class: Insecta
- Order: Hymenoptera
- Family: Formicidae
- Subfamily: Myrmicinae
- Tribe: Attini
- Genus: Myrmicocrypta; Smith, 1860

Type species
- Myrmicocrypta squamosa

Diversity
- 27 species

= Myrmicocrypta =

Genus of ants

Myrmicocrypta is a Neotropical genus of fungus-growing ants in the subfamily Myrmicinae. The genus is known from Mexico to Argentina. Their colonies are generally small, consisting of fewer than 200 individuals.

== Species ==
- Myrmicocrypta boliviana Weber, 1938
- Myrmicocrypta bruchi Santschi, 1936
- Myrmicocrypta bucki Sosa-Calvo & Schultz, 2010
- Myrmicocrypta buenzlii Borgmeier, 1934
- Myrmicocrypta camargoi Sosa-Calvo & Schultz, 2010
- Myrmicocrypta collaris Emery, 1913
- Myrmicocrypta dilacerata (Forel, 1885)
- Myrmicocrypta ednaella Mann, 1922
- Myrmicocrypta elisabethae Weber, 1937
- Myrmicocrypta erectapilosa Sosa-Calvo & Schultz, 2010
- Myrmicocrypta foreli Mann, 1916
- Myrmicocrypta godmani Forel, 1899
- Myrmicocrypta guianensis Weber, 1937
- Myrmicocrypta infuscata Weber, 1946
- Myrmicocrypta longinoda Weber, 1938
- Myrmicocrypta microphthalma Borgmeier, 1948
- Myrmicocrypta occipitalis Weber, 1938
- Myrmicocrypta ogloblini Santschi, 1936
- Myrmicocrypta rudiscapa Emery, 1913
- Myrmicocrypta spinosa Weber, 1937
- Myrmicocrypta squamosa Smith, 1860
- Myrmicocrypta subnitida Forel, 1899
- Myrmicocrypta triangulata Forel, 1912
- Myrmicocrypta tuberculata Weber, 1938
- Myrmicocrypta unidentata Weber, 1937
- Myrmicocrypta urichi Weber, 1937
- Myrmicocrypta weyrauchi Borgmeier, 1948
