= Crematogaster barbouri =

Scientific classification
- Domain: Eukaryota
- Kingdom: Animalia
- Phylum: Arthropoda
- Class: Insecta
- Order: Hymenoptera
- Family: Formicidae
- Subfamily: Myrmicinae
- Genus: Crematogaster
- Species: C. barbouri

Binomial name
- Crematogaster barbouri Weber, 1934

Species of ant

Crematogaster barbouri is a species of ant in tribe Crematogastrini. It was described by Weber in 1934.
