= Crematogaster armandi =

Scientific classification
- Domain: Eukaryota
- Kingdom: Animalia
- Phylum: Arthropoda
- Class: Insecta
- Order: Hymenoptera
- Family: Formicidae
- Subfamily: Myrmicinae
- Genus: Crematogaster
- Species: C. armandi

Binomial name
- Crematogaster armandi Forel, 1921

Species of ant

Crematogaster armandi is a species of ant in tribe Crematogastrini. It was described by Forel in 1921.
