= Crematogaster affabilis =

Scientific classification
- Domain: Eukaryota
- Kingdom: Animalia
- Phylum: Arthropoda
- Class: Insecta
- Order: Hymenoptera
- Family: Formicidae
- Subfamily: Myrmicinae
- Genus: Crematogaster
- Species: C. affabilis

Binomial name
- Crematogaster affabilis Forel, 1907

Species of ant

Crematogaster affabilis is a species of ant in tribe Crematogastrini. It was described by Forel in 1907.
