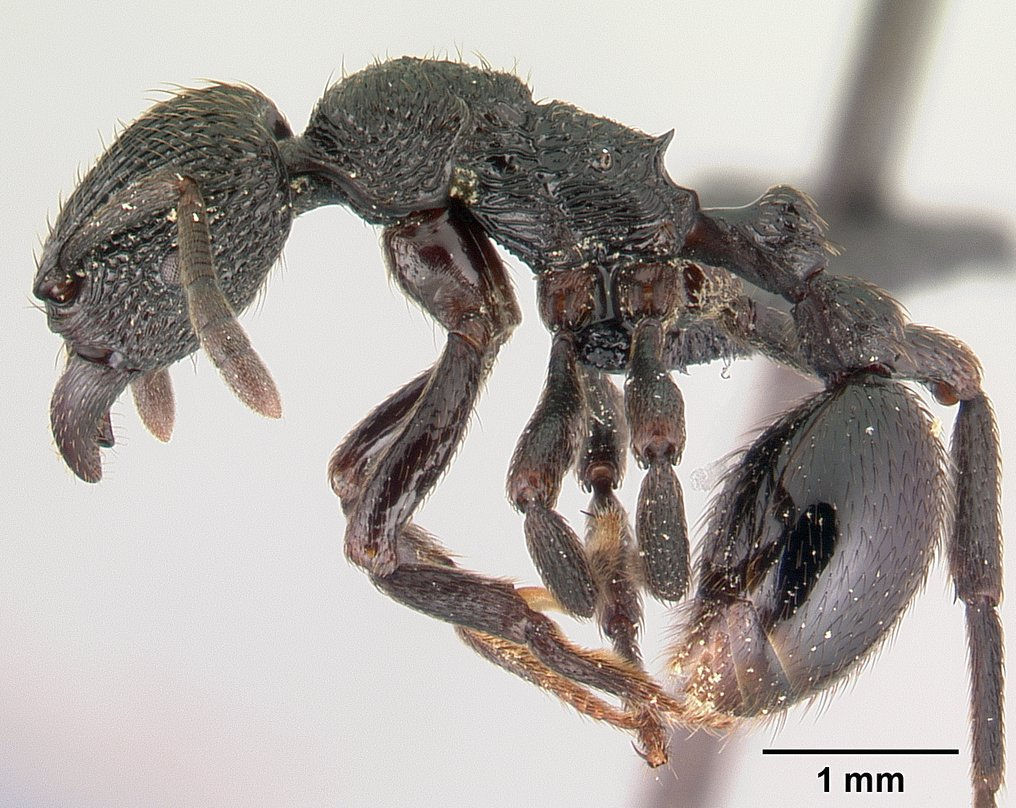
- Eutetramorium monticellii worker from Comoros

Scientific classification
- Domain: Eukaryota
- Kingdom: Animalia
- Phylum: Arthropoda
- Class: Insecta
- Order: Hymenoptera
- Family: Formicidae
- Subfamily: Myrmicinae
- Tribe: Crematogastrini
- Genus: Eutetramorium; Emery, 1899

Type species
- Eutetramorium mocquerysi Emery, 1899

Diversity
- 3 species

= Eutetramorium =

Genus of ants

Eutetramorium is a small genus of ants within the subfamily Myrmicinae. To date it contains three species found in Madagascar and Comoros.

== Species ==
- Eutetramorium mocquerysi Emery 1899 – Madagascar
- Eutetramorium monticellii Emery 1899 – Comoros
- Eutetramorium parvum Bolton & Fisher, 2014 – Madagascar

== Description ==
The queen is extremely ergatoid in E. mocquerysi, alate in E. monticellii. In E. parvum a normal dealate queen is present in the type-series, but there is also a specimen that may be an ergatoid or a worker-queen intercaste, or possibly merely an oversized worker. Males are known only for E. mocquerysi, where it is smaller than conspecific workers.

== Taxonomy ==
This small genus was established by Emery (1899) for two conspicuous, large, darkly coloured Madagascan species that superficially resemble Tetramorium. Initially, Emery (1912, 1914) was of the opinion that the genus was referable to the tribe Myrmecinini, but Ashmead (1905) and Wheeler (1910) had already referred it to Tetramoriini, an opinion that Emery (1915, 1924) also came to accept. Bolton (1976) excluded Eutetramorium from Tetramoriini on morphological grounds, and tentatively transferred it to Myrmicini. This placement persisted until recently, when a molecular analysis of Myrmicini by Jansen & Savolainen (2010) showed that the monophyly of the tribe was dubious, and that Eutetramorium formed a clade with Huberia. The yet unpublished, more detailed, DNA analysis of Myrmicinae by Philip S. Ward has established that Eutetramorium belongs in a strongly supported, endemic Madagascan clade that also includes the other four genera: Malagidris, Myrmisaraka, Royidris and Vitsika.
