= Crematogaster boliviana =

Scientific classification
- Kingdom: Animalia
- Phylum: Arthropoda
- Class: Insecta
- Order: Hymenoptera
- Family: Formicidae
- Subfamily: Myrmicinae
- Genus: Crematogaster
- Species: C. boliviana

Binomial name
- Crematogaster boliviana Wheeler, 1922

Species of ant

Crematogaster boliviana is a species of ant in tribe Crematogastrini. It was described by Wheeler in 1922.
