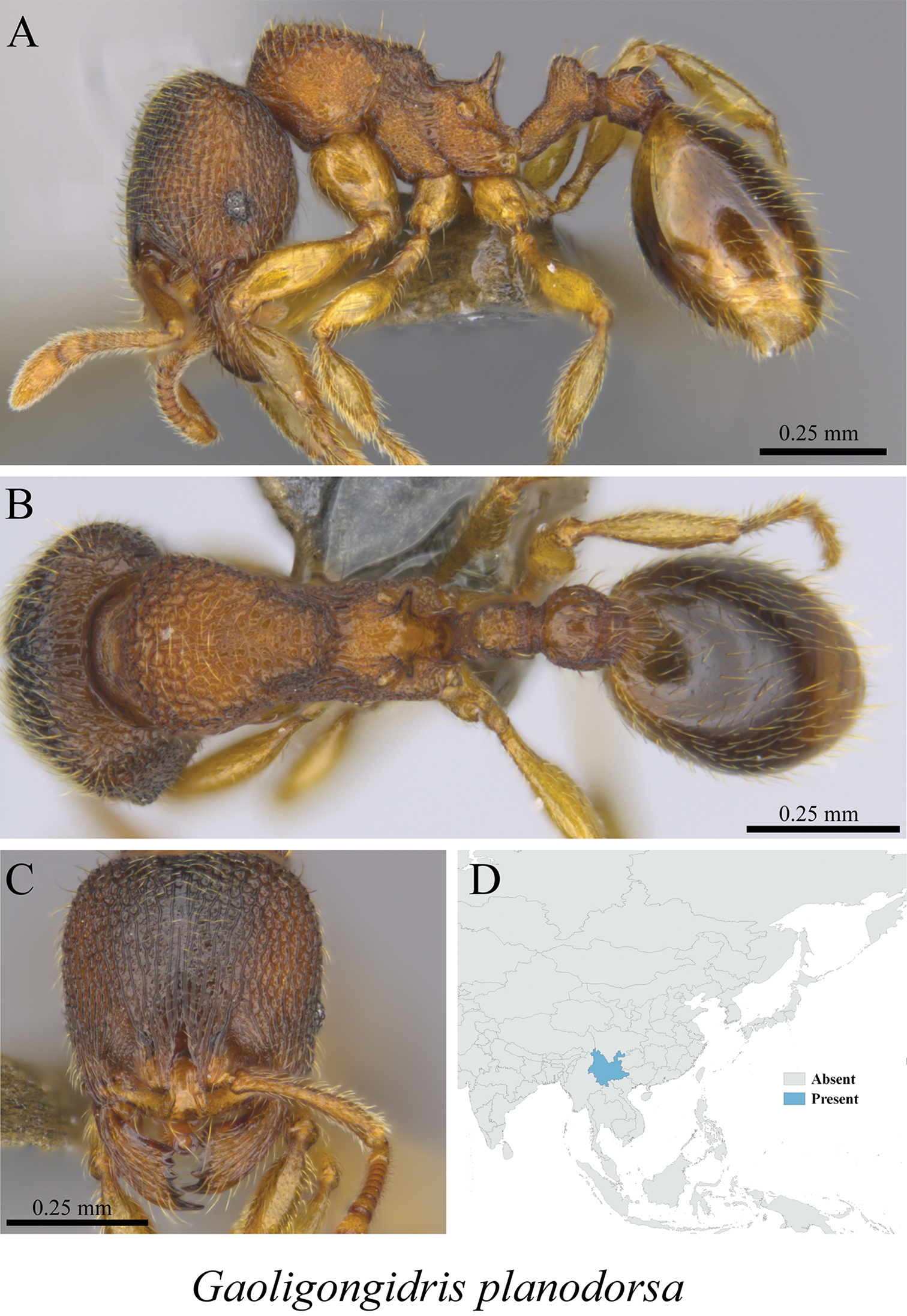
- Gaoligongidris planodorsa type specimen

Scientific classification
- Kingdom: Animalia
- Phylum: Arthropoda
- Class: Insecta
- Order: Hymenoptera
- Family: Formicidae
- Subfamily: Myrmicinae
- Tribe: Crematogastrini
- Genus: Gaoligongidris; Xu, 2012
- Species: G. planodorsa

Binomial name
- Gaoligongidris planodorsa Xu, 2012

= Gaoligongidris =

Genus of ants

Gaoligongidris (named after the type locality) is an Asian genus of ants in the subfamily Myrmicinae. It contains the single species Gaoligongidris planodorsa, collected in the Gaoligong Mountains, Yunnan Province, China. The genus is known only from workers, nests in the soil, and forages on the ground. While similar to the genus Lophomyrmex of the tribe Attini, Gaoligongidris is most closely related to the Indo-Australian Lasiomyrma, tribe Crematogastrini.
