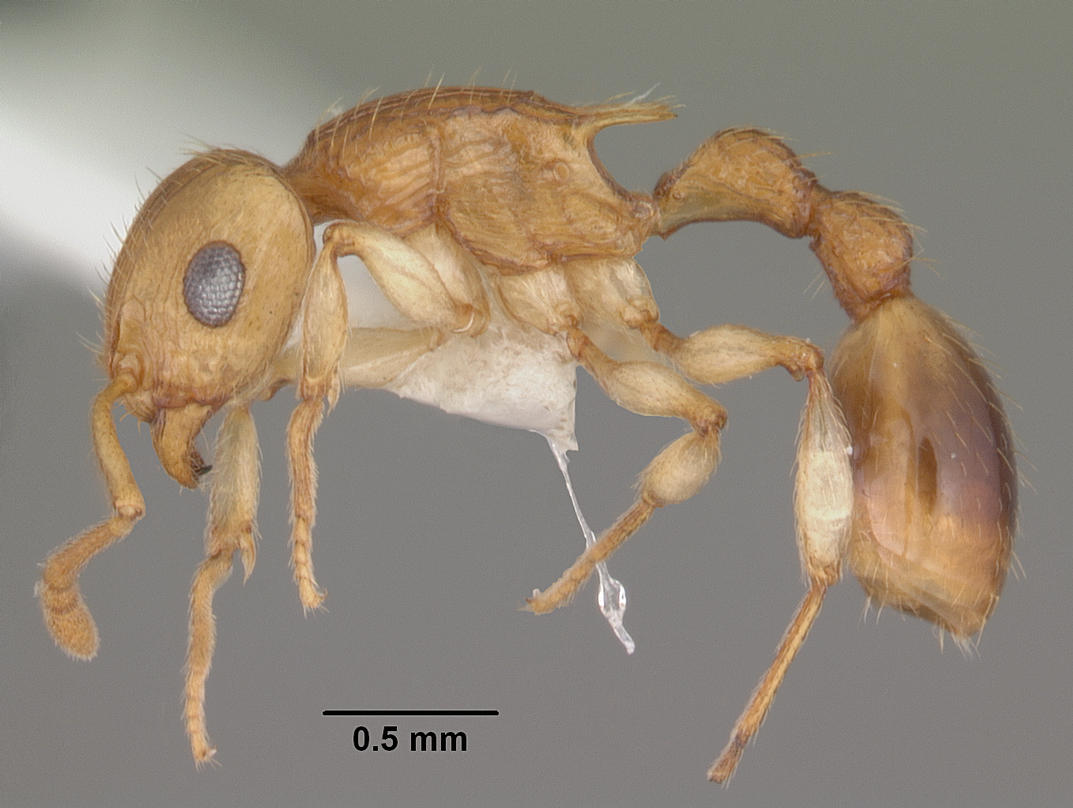
- Rotastruma recava worker

Scientific classification
- Domain: Eukaryota
- Kingdom: Animalia
- Phylum: Arthropoda
- Class: Insecta
- Order: Hymenoptera
- Family: Formicidae
- Subfamily: Myrmicinae
- Tribe: Crematogastrini
- Genus: Rotastruma; Bolton, 1991

Type species
- Rotastruma recava Bolton, 1991

Diversity
- 2 species

= Rotastruma =

Genus of ants

Rotastruma is a small genus of arboreal ants in the subfamily Myrmicinae. Its two species are known from the Oriental region: the type species Rotastruma recava is known from the Bukit Timah Nature Reserve, Singapore, and Rotastruma stenoceps is known from Guangdong, China.

Little is known about the genus, and like most other arboreal ants, their biology remains unknown. However, they seem to have affinities with Paratopula and Romblonella.

== Species ==
- Rotastruma recava Bolton, 1991
- Rotastruma stenoceps Bolton, 1991
