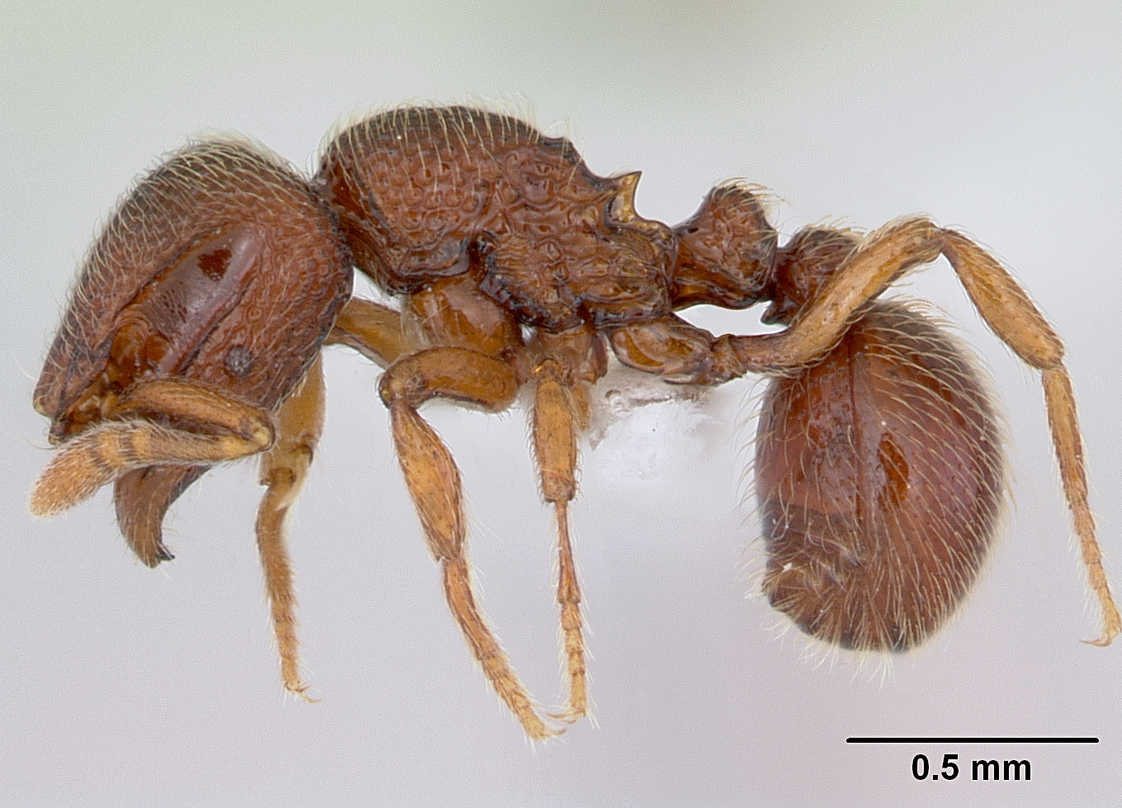
- Dicroaspis cryptocera worker from the Central African Republic

Scientific classification
- Domain: Eukaryota
- Kingdom: Animalia
- Phylum: Arthropoda
- Class: Insecta
- Order: Hymenoptera
- Family: Formicidae
- Subfamily: Myrmicinae
- Tribe: Crematogastrini
- Genus: Dicroaspis; Emery, 1908

Type species
- Dicroaspis cryptocera Emery, 1908

Diversity
- 2 species

Synonyms
- Geognomicus Menozzi, 1924

= Dicroaspis =

Genus of ants

Dicroaspis is an African genus of ants in the subfamily Myrmicinae.

== Distribution ==
Known from central Africa, the genus contains two species. However, due to the little material available, they may represent variations the same species. A third hitherto undescribed species is known from Kakamega Forest, Kenya.

== Description ==
The genus was first described by Emery (1908), but was reclassified a few years later as a subgenus of Calyptomyrmex by Emery (1915). The taxon was finally raised to genus rank by Bolton (1981). Workers are about 2.5–3 mm long and have small eyes. Their antennae with 11 segments can be used to separate Dicroaspis from the related and similar genus Calyptomyrmex. Little is known about their biology, but they appear to live in the leaf litter of rainforests.

== Species ==
- Dicroaspis cryptocera Emery, 1908
- Dicroaspis laevidens (Santschi, 1919)
