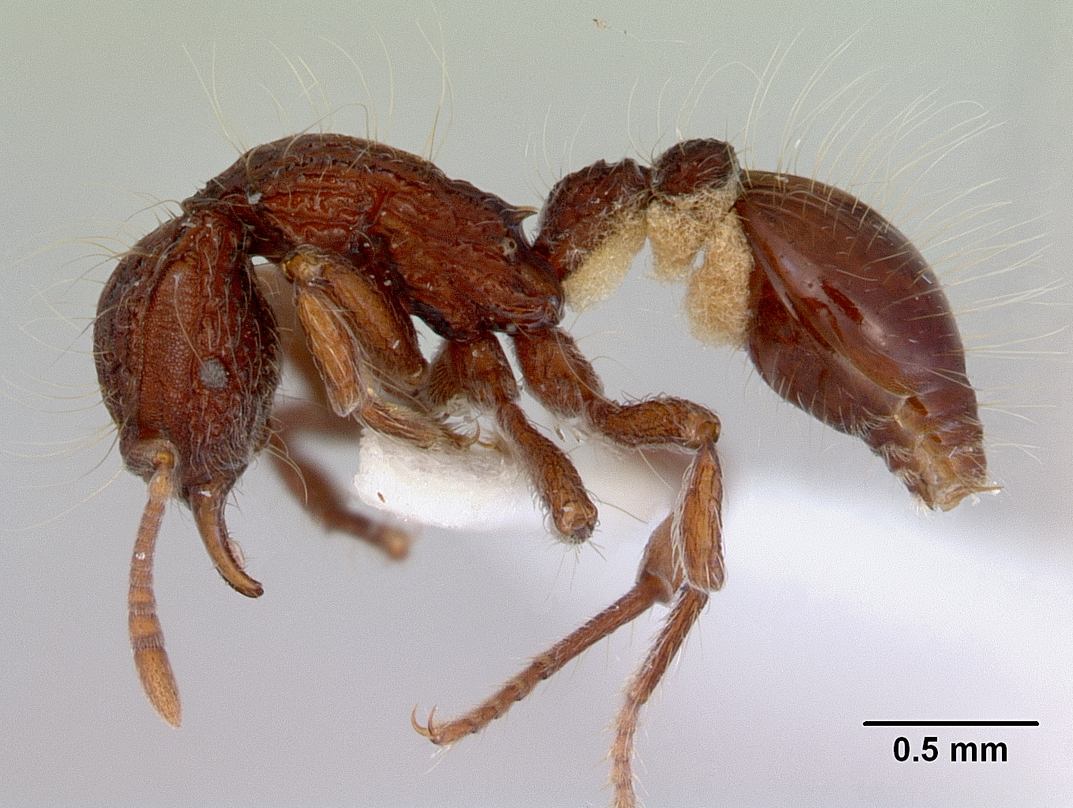
- Dacetinops cirrosus worker

Scientific classification
- Kingdom: Animalia
- Phylum: Arthropoda
- Class: Insecta
- Order: Hymenoptera
- Family: Formicidae
- Subfamily: Myrmicinae
- Tribe: Crematogastrini
- Genus: Dacetinops; Brown & Wilson, 1957

Type species
- Dacetinops cibdelus Brown & Wilson, 1957

Diversity
- 7 species

= Dacetinops =

Genus of ants

Dacetinops is a genus of ants in the subfamily Myrmicinae. Its seven species are known from Borneo (D. cirrosus, D. concinnus, D. solivagus and D. wilsoni), and Papua New Guinea (D. cibdelus, D. darlingtonl and D. ignotus). One species, D. cirrosus, is known also from Terengganu and Johor, West Malaysia.

The genus was first described with the type species D. cibdelus by Brown & Wilson (1957), based on workers, dealate queens and larvae collected by Wilson near Lae, Papua New Guinea. Ants of the genus had previously been collected 50 years earlier in the Astrolabe Bay area, Papua New Guinea, but the specimen were placed unsorted in the collections of the Hungarian Natural History Museum, where they remained until recognized by Taylor (1985).

== Species ==
- Dacetinops cibdelus Brown & Wilson, 1957
- Dacetinops cirrosus Taylor, 1985
- Dacetinops concinnus Taylor, 1965
- Dacetinops darlingtoni Taylor, 1985
- Dacetinops ignotus Taylor, 1985
- Dacetinops solivagus Taylor, 1985
- Dacetinops wilsoni Taylor, 1985
