= Aretidris =

Scientific classification
- Kingdom: Animalia
- Phylum: Arthropoda
- Class: Insecta
- Order: Hymenoptera
- Family: Formicidae
- Subfamily: Myrmicinae
- Tribe: Crematogastrini
- Alliance: Vollenhovia genus group
- Genus: Aretidris; General, 2015

Genus of ants

Aretidris is a genus of ants belonging to the family Formicidae.

The species of this genus are found in Southeastern Asia.

== Species ==
Species:

- Aretidris buenaventei General, 2015
- Aretidris clousei General, 2015
