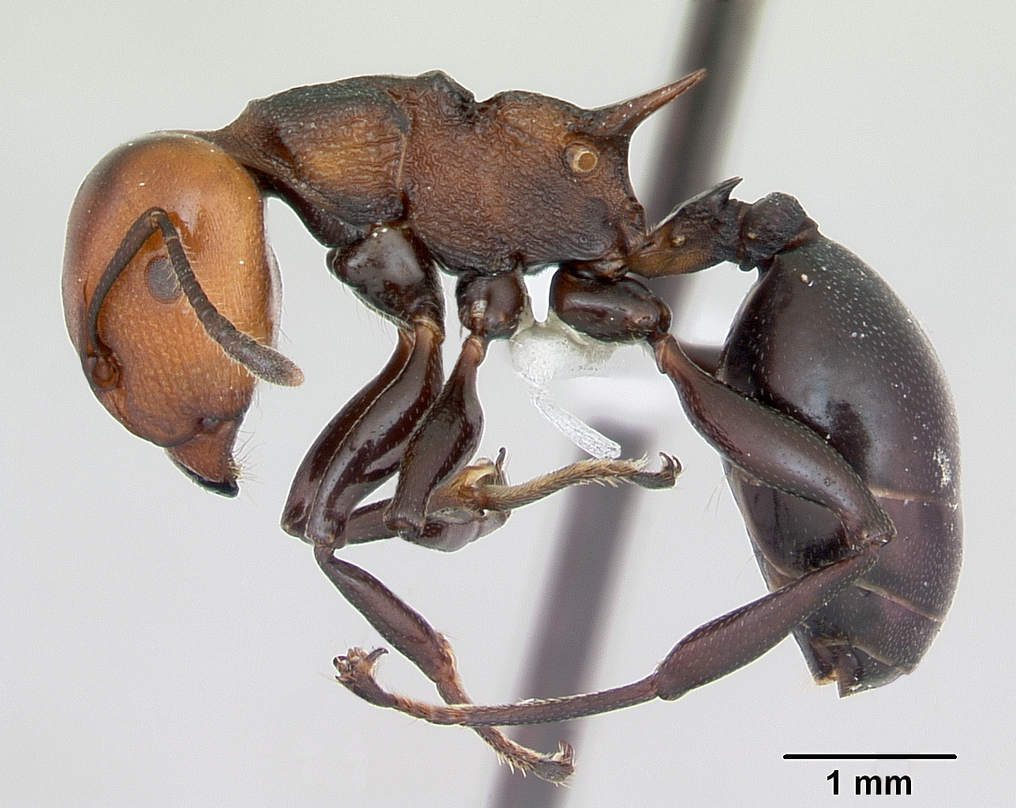
- Atopomyrmex mocquerysi worker from the Central African Republic

Scientific classification
- Kingdom: Animalia
- Phylum: Arthropoda
- Class: Insecta
- Order: Hymenoptera
- Family: Formicidae
- Subfamily: Myrmicinae
- Tribe: Crematogastrini
- Genus: Atopomyrmex; André, 1889

Type species
- Atopomyrmex mocquerysi André, 1889

Diversity
- 3 species

= Atopomyrmex =

Genus of ants

Atopomyrmex is a small genus of arboreal ants in the subfamily Myrmicinae. The genus is known from the Afrotropics, where they nest in living wood and forage in the vegetation or on the ground.

== Species ==
- Atopomyrmex calpocalycola Snelling, 1992
- Atopomyrmex cryptoceroides Emery, 1892
- Atopomyrmex mocquerysi André, 1889
