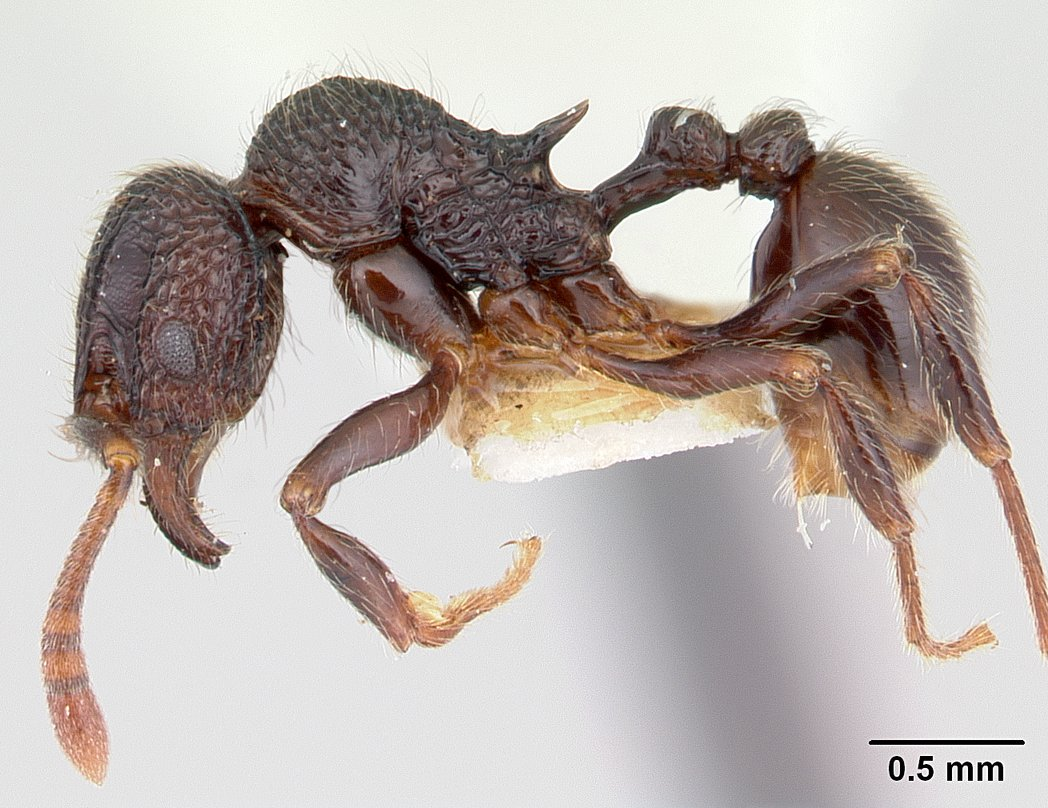
- Cyphoidris spinosa worker

Scientific classification
- Kingdom: Animalia
- Phylum: Arthropoda
- Class: Insecta
- Order: Hymenoptera
- Family: Formicidae
- Subfamily: Myrmicinae
- Tribe: Crematogastrini
- Genus: Cyphoidris; Weber, 1952

Type species
- Cyphoidris spinosa Weber, 1952

Diversity
- 4 species

= Cyphoidris =

Genus of ants

Cyphoidris is a genus of myrmicine ants known from Africa.

== Species ==
- Cyphoidris exalta Bolton, 1981 – Central Africa
- Cyphoidris parissa Bolton, 1981 – West Africa
- Cyphoidris spinosa Weber, 1952 – Central Africa
- Cyphoidris werneri Bolton, 1981 – East Africa
