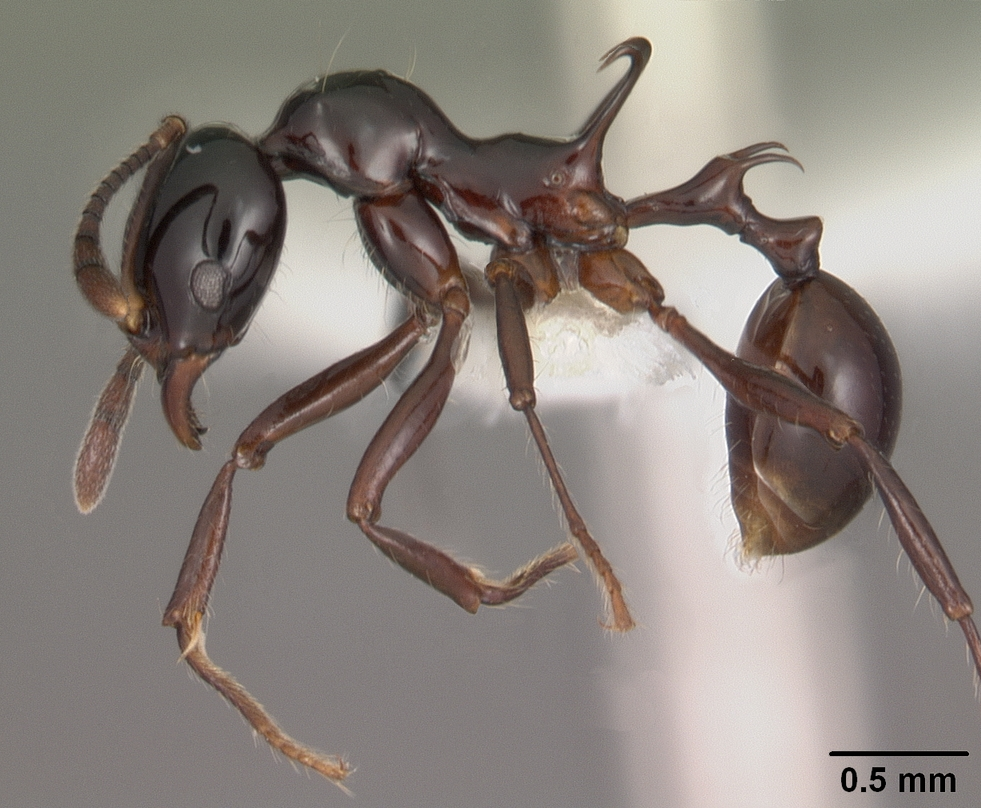
- A. polyrhachioides worker

Scientific classification
- Kingdom: Animalia
- Phylum: Arthropoda
- Clade: Pancrustacea
- Class: Insecta
- Order: Hymenoptera
- Family: Formicidae
- Subfamily: Myrmicinae
- Tribe: Crematogastrini
- Alliance: Lordomyrma genus group
- Genus: Ancyridris; Wheeler, 1935

Type species
- Ancyridris polyrhachioides Wheeler, 1935

Species
- A. polyrhachioides Wheeler, 1935; A. rupicapra (Stitz, 1938)

Diversity
- 2 species

= Ancyridris =

Genus of ants

Ancyridris is a small genus of myrmicine ants, with only two described species from New Guinea.

== Description ==
A. polyrhachioides worker: a) Lateral view b) Head, dorsal view c) Thorax and abdomen, dorsal view

The eyes are well developed. The long and narrow mesosoma is shaped somewhat as in Aphaenogaster. The propodeum bears two long, flattened, hooked spines resembling those of Polyrhachis bihamata. On the pronotum there are long hairs. The worker of A. polyrhachioides is almost 6 mm long. Apart from the curious anchor-like spines on its propodeum, Ancyridris bears a general resemblance to Aphaenogaster or certain worker forms of Pheidole. Wheeler suspected some aberrant or archaic group, "another of the living fossils which are continually turning up in the Papuan and Australian Regions". Ancyridris in fact seems close to Lordomyrma. It is the only ant genus currently thought to be endemic to the island of New Guinea.

A. rupicapra was originally described in the genus Pheidole (Pheidolacanthinus). Its workers are 4 mm long. A. polyrhachioides is black, and A. rupicapra reddish-brown (as implied by its specific epithet which translates as "red goat", referring as well to the goat-horn like propodeal spines. The sole known rupicapra specimen was collected in the mountains of the Sepik River catchment by the German colonial Kaiserin Augustafluss Expedition (1912–13).

The two original type specimens of A. polyrhachioides were recovered somewhat damaged from the stomach of an eastern blue-grey robin (Peneothello cyanus subcyaneus) which was caught on Mount Misim in the Morobe District of New Guinea.

== Name ==
The genus name is derived from the Ancient Greek ἄγκυρα "anchor" with the suffix of ant genera -idris, which comes from the Greek word ἴδρις (ídris) "knowledgeable".
