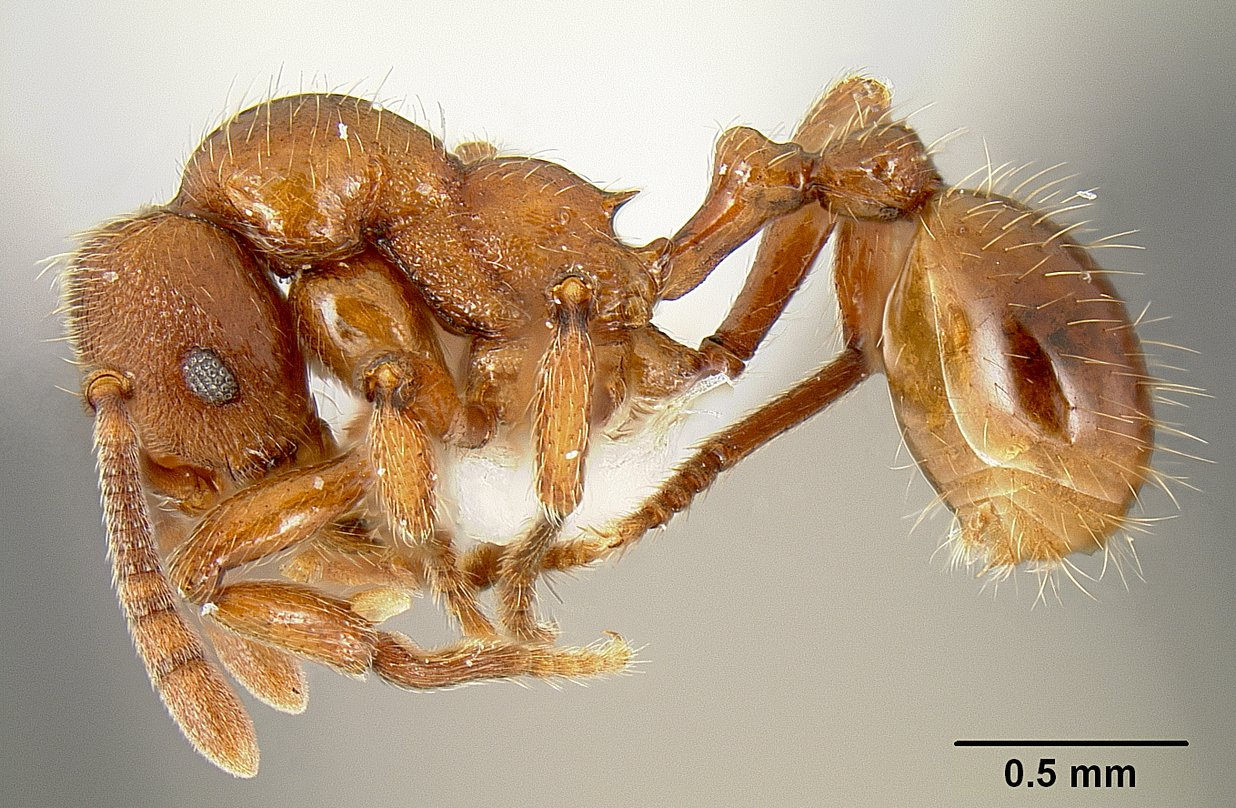

Scientific classification
- Domain: Eukaryota
- Kingdom: Animalia
- Phylum: Arthropoda
- Class: Insecta
- Order: Hymenoptera
- Family: Formicidae
- Subfamily: Myrmicinae
- Tribe: Crematogastrini
- Genus: Propodilobus; Branstetter, 2009
- Species: P. pingorum

Binomial name
- Propodilobus pingorum (DuBois, 2000)

= Propodilobus =

Genus of ants

Propodilobus is a genus of ants in the subfamily Myrmicinae. It contains the single species Propodilobus pingorum, known only from two localities on Borneo, Sarawak, Malaysia.
