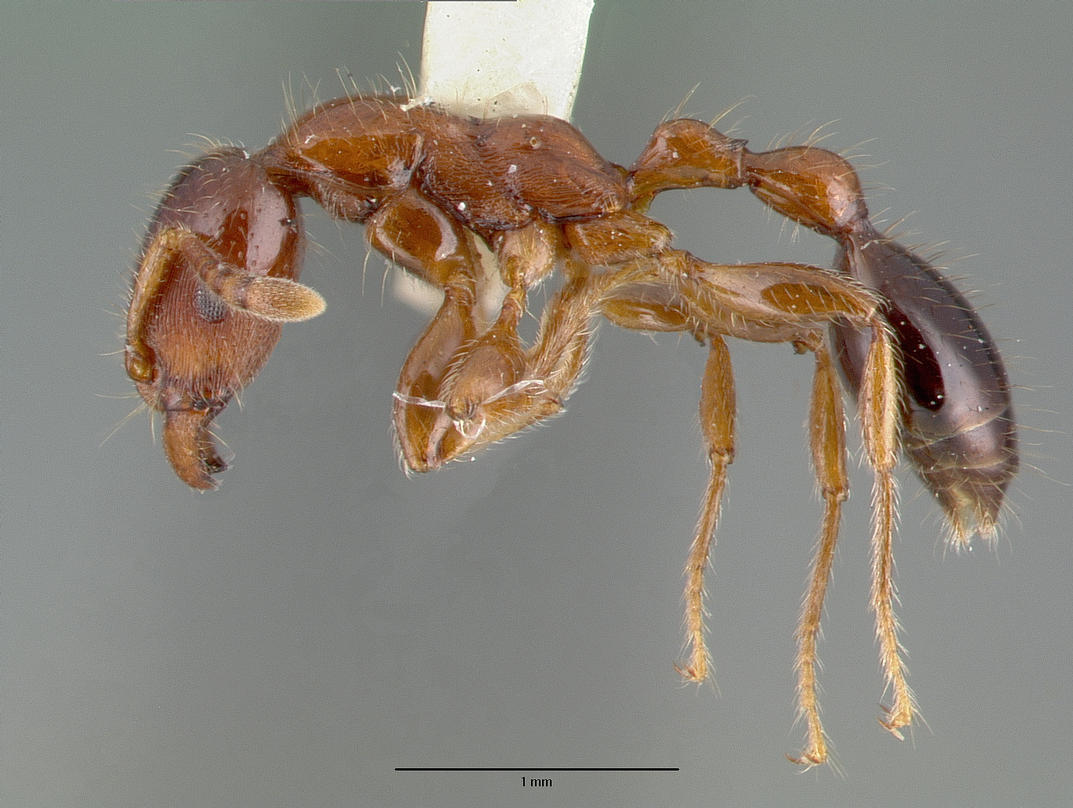
- Podomyrma minor worker from Indonesia

Scientific classification
- Kingdom: Animalia
- Phylum: Arthropoda
- Clade: Pancrustacea
- Class: Insecta
- Order: Hymenoptera
- Family: Formicidae
- Subfamily: Myrmicinae
- Tribe: Crematogastrini
- Alliance: Podomyrma genus group
- Genus: Podomyrma; Smith, 1859

Type species
- Podomyrma femorata Smith, 1859

Diversity
- 52 species

= Podomyrma =

Genus of ants

Podomyrma is a genus of ants in the subfamily Myrmicinae. They are relatively common and found across Australia, New Guinea, and its surrounding islands. The genus is commonly referred to as muscleman tree ants due to their widened leg segments that look like flexing muscles. These ants are frequently found in and around trees, especially Eucalyptus where they live. Most species have multiple colours, shades of red, brown, black and orange.

== Species ==
- Podomyrma abdominalis Emery, 1887
- Podomyrma adelaidae (Smith, 1858)
- Podomyrma alae Donisthorpe, 1949
- Podomyrma albertisi Emery, 1887
- Podomyrma basalis Smith, 1859
- Podomyrma bispinosa Forel, 1901
- Podomyrma carinata Donisthorpe, 1947
- Podomyrma chasei Forel, 1901
- Podomyrma christae (Forel, 1907)
- Podomyrma clarki (Crawley, 1925)
- Podomyrma delbrueckii Forel, 1901
- Podomyrma densestrigosa Viehmeyer, 1924
- Podomyrma elongata Forel, 1895
- Podomyrma femorata Smith, 1859
- Podomyrma ferruginea (Clark, 1934)
- Podomyrma formosa (Smith, 1858)
- Podomyrma gastralis Emery, 1897
- Podomyrma gibbula Viehmeyer, 1914
- Podomyrma gratiosa (Smith, 1858)
- Podomyrma grossestriata Forel, 1915
- Podomyrma inermis Mayr, 1876
- Podomyrma keysseri Viehmeyer, 1914
- Podomyrma kitschneri (Forel, 1915)
- Podomyrma kraepelini Forel, 1901
- Podomyrma laevifrons Smith, 1859
- Podomyrma laevissima Smith, 1863
- Podomyrma lampros Viehmeyer, 1924
- Podomyrma libra (Forel, 1907)
- Podomyrma macrophthalma Viehmeyer, 1925
- Podomyrma maculiventris Emery, 1887
- Podomyrma maligna (Smith, 1865)
- Podomyrma marginata (McAreavey, 1949)
- †Podomyrma mayri Emery, 1891
- Podomyrma micans Mayr, 1876
- Podomyrma minor Donisthorpe, 1949
- Podomyrma mjobergi (Forel, 1915)
- Podomyrma muckeli Forel, 1910
- Podomyrma novemdentata Forel, 1901
- Podomyrma obscurior Forel, 1915
- Podomyrma octodentata Forel, 1901
- Podomyrma odae Forel, 1910
- Podomyrma omniparens (Forel, 1895)
- Podomyrma overbecki Viehmeyer, 1924
- Podomyrma pulchella Donisthorpe, 1938
- Podomyrma ruficeps Smith, 1863
- Podomyrma rugosa (Clark, 1934)
- Podomyrma silvicola Smith, 1860
- Podomyrma simillima Smith, 1860
- Podomyrma testacea Donisthorpe, 1949
- Podomyrma tristis Karavaiev, 1935
- Podomyrma turneri (Forel, 1901)
- Podomyrma vidua Santschi, 1932
