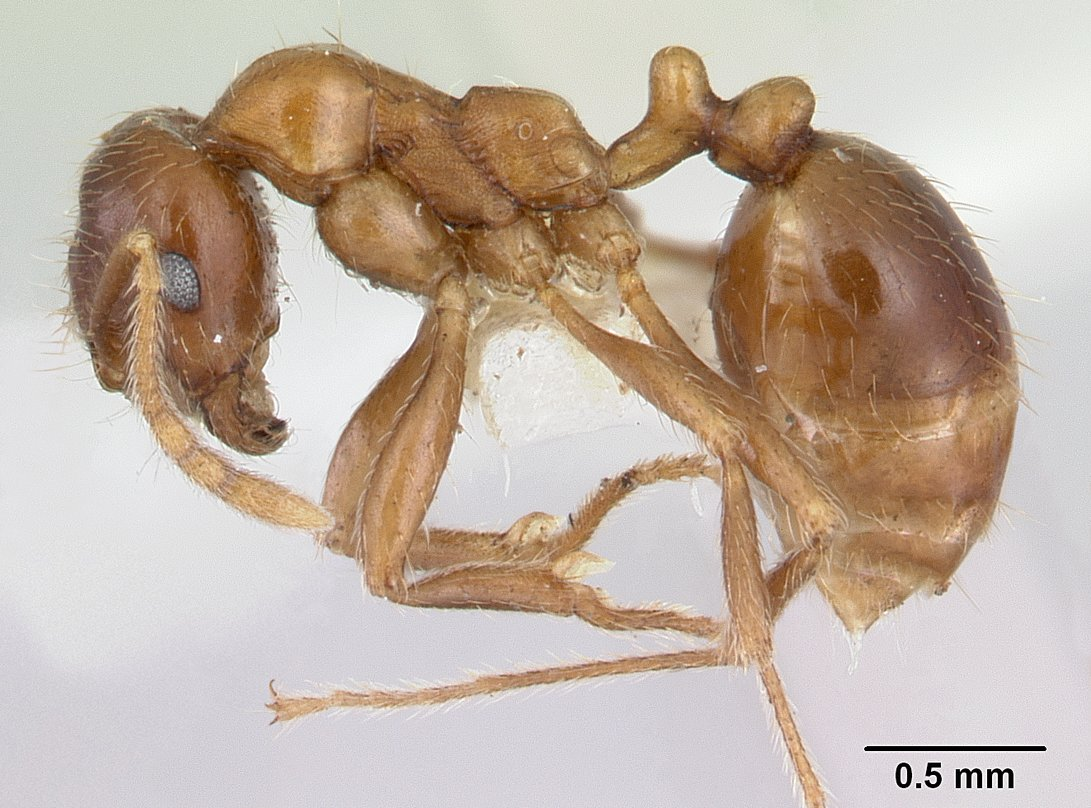
- Kartidris matertera worker

Scientific classification
- Domain: Eukaryota
- Kingdom: Animalia
- Phylum: Arthropoda
- Class: Insecta
- Order: Hymenoptera
- Family: Formicidae
- Subfamily: Myrmicinae
- Tribe: Crematogastrini
- Genus: Kartidris; Bolton, 1991

Type species
- Kartidris nyos Bolton, 1991

Diversity
- 6 species

= Kartidris =

Genus of ants

Kartidris is an Indomalayan genus of terrestrial ants in the subfamily Myrmicinae. Its six species are known from mountainous areas in China, Thailand and India.

== Species ==
- Kartidris ashima Xu & Zheng, 1995
- Kartidris fujianensis Wang, 1993
- Kartidris galos Bolton, 1991
- Kartidris matertera Bolton, 1991
- Kartidris nyos Bolton, 1991
- Kartidris sparsipila Xu, 1999
