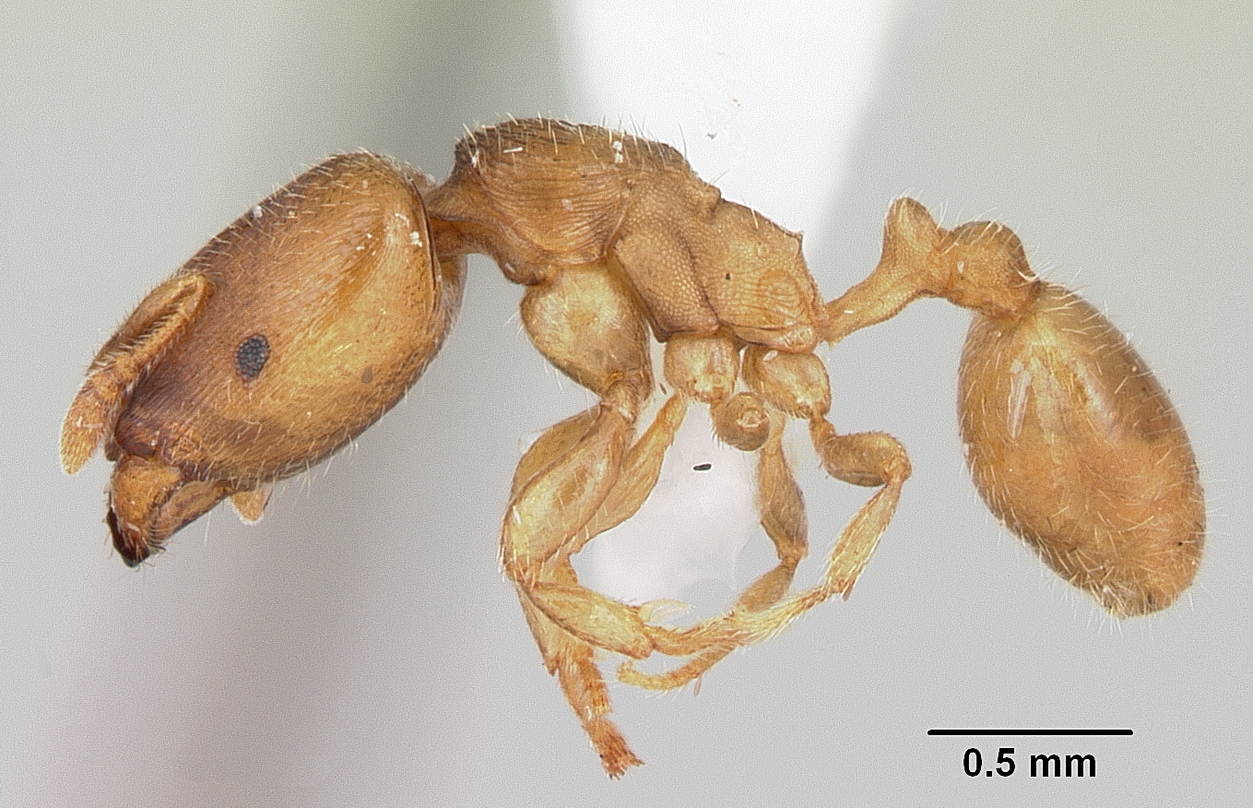
- Adlerzia froggatti worker

Scientific classification
- Domain: Eukaryota
- Kingdom: Animalia
- Phylum: Arthropoda
- Class: Insecta
- Order: Hymenoptera
- Family: Formicidae
- Subfamily: Myrmicinae
- Tribe: Crematogastrini
- Genus: Adlerzia; Forel, 1902
- Species: A. froggatti

Binomial name
- Adlerzia froggatti (Forel, 1902)

= Adlerzia =

Genus of ants

Adlerzia is a genus of ant in the subfamily Myrmicinae containing the single species Adlerzia froggatti.
