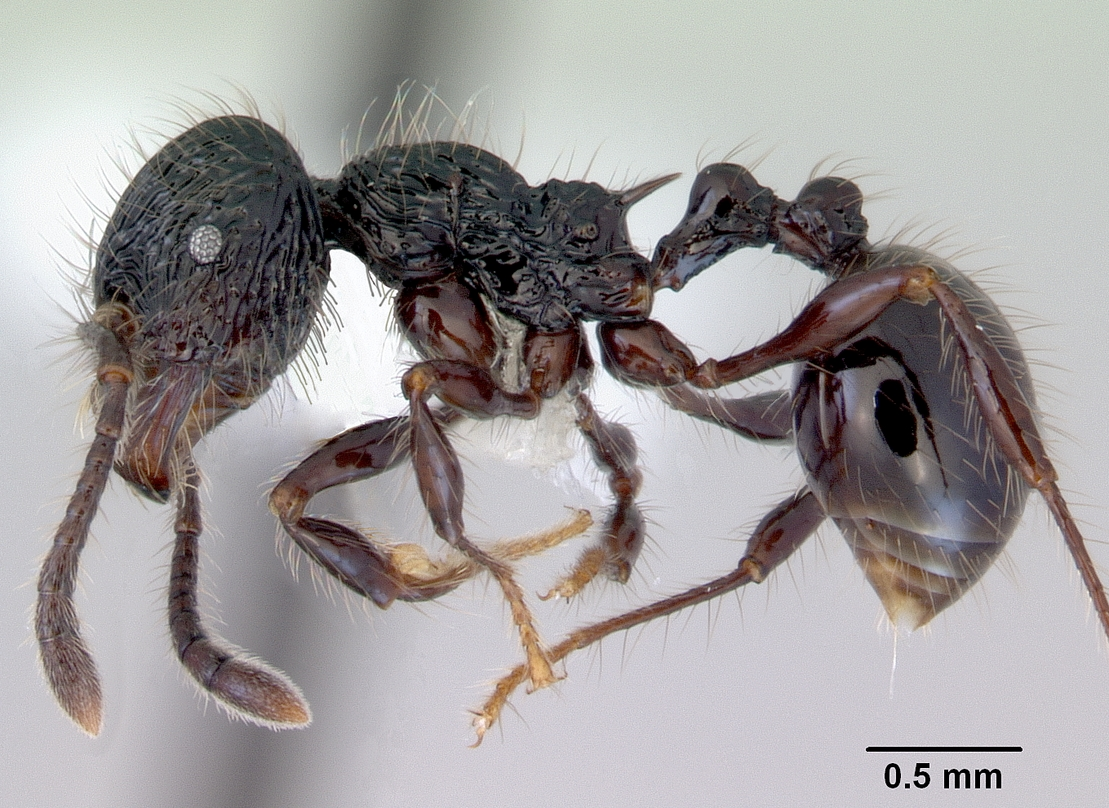
- Perissomyrmex snyderi worker

Scientific classification
- Kingdom: Animalia
- Phylum: Arthropoda
- Class: Insecta
- Order: Hymenoptera
- Family: Formicidae
- Subfamily: Myrmicinae
- Tribe: Crematogastrini
- Genus: Perissomyrmex; Smith, 1947

Type species
- Perissomyrmex snyderi Smith, 1947

Diversity
- 6 species

= Perissomyrmex =

Genus of ants

Perissomyrmex is a genus of ants in the subfamily Myrmicinae. It is known from the Neotropical and Oriental realms.

The genus was first described in 1947 from two workers discovered in Hoboken plant quarantine in New Jersey, United States. The ants were found in the root of a Begonia plant that had been shipped from Guatemala. Due to the genus' close affinities to the exclusively Old World genus Pristomyrmex, it was thought that the ants had been brought to the US via Guatemala from the Oriental or the Indo-Australian regions. However, with the later rediscovery of Perissomyrmex in Central America, the disjunct distribution could be confirmed.

== Species ==
- Perissomyrmex bidentatus Zhou & Huang, 2006
- Perissomyrmex fissus Xu & Wang, 2004
- Perissomyrmex guizhouensis Zhou & Huang, 2006
- Perissomyrmex medogensis Xu & Zhang, 2012
- Perissomyrmex monticola Baroni Urbani & De Andrade, 1993
- Perissomyrmex snyderi Smith, 1947
