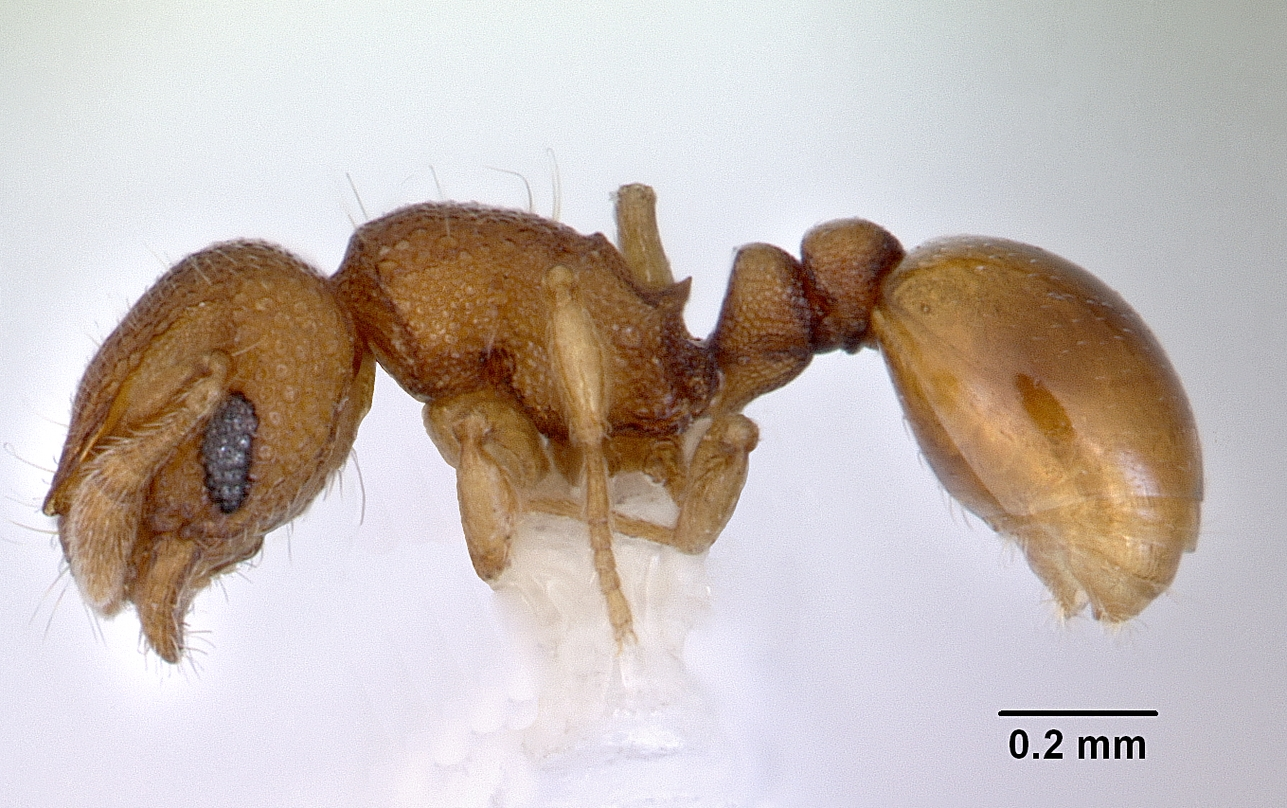
- Mayriella abstinens worker

Scientific classification
- Kingdom: Animalia
- Phylum: Arthropoda
- Class: Insecta
- Order: Hymenoptera
- Family: Formicidae
- Subfamily: Myrmicinae
- Tribe: Crematogastrini
- Alliance: Mayriella genus group
- Genus: Mayriella; Forel, 1902

Type species
- Mayriella abstinens

Diversity
- 9 species

= Mayriella =

Genus of ants

Mayriella is an Indo-Australian genus of ants in the subfamily Myrmicinae. Colonies in this genus are very small, typically consisting of 50 - 100 individuals. They are diurnal.

== Biology ==
Species of this genus are encountered in moist forested areas, where most specimens have been found in wet regions, while some species have been found in dry sclerophyll areas, although this is usually uncommon. Colonies only consist of 50 - 100 individuals, and nests are found in soil, typically under stones or around a small mound that contains an entrance. Ants of this genus contain stings.

== Species ==
- Mayriella abstinens Forel, 1902
- Mayriella ebbei Shattuck & Barnett, 2007
- Mayriella granulata Dlussky & Radchenko, 1990
- Mayriella occidua Shattuck, 2007
- Mayriella overbecki Viehmeyer, 1925
- Mayriella sharpi Shattuck & Barnett, 2007
- Mayriella spinosior Wheeler, W.M., 1935
- Mayriella transfuga Baroni Urbani, 1977
- Mayriella warchalowskii Borowiec, 2007
