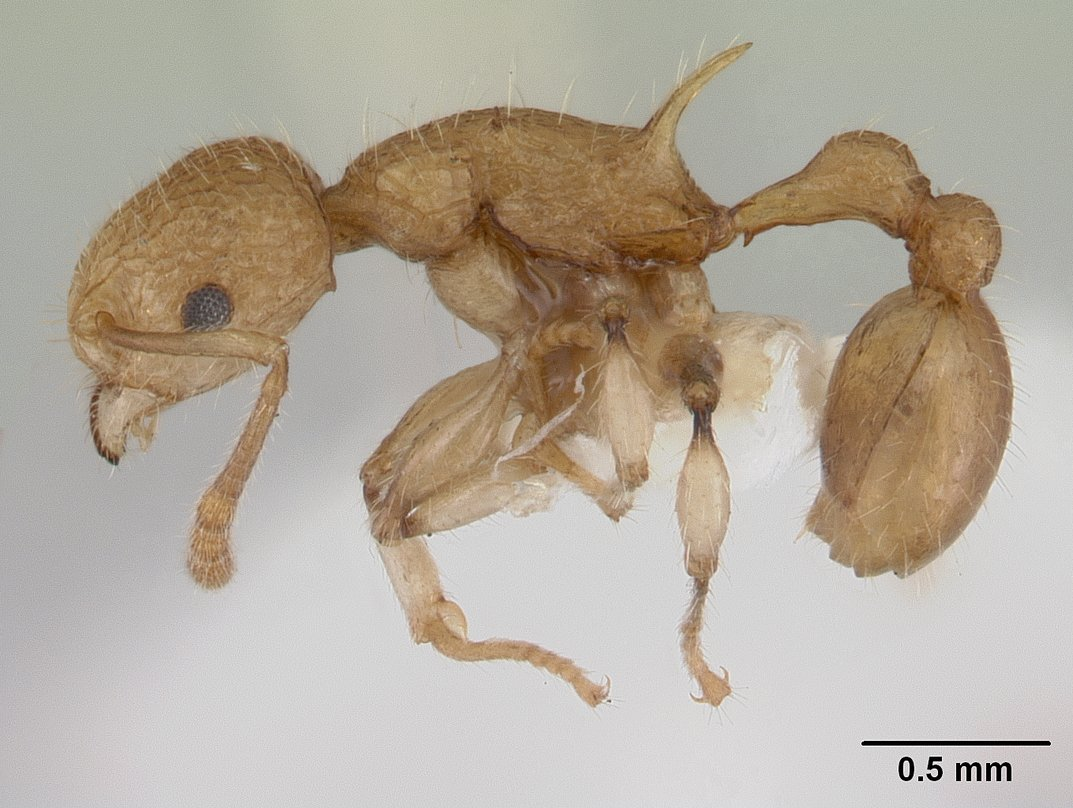
- Vombisidris philax worker from Indonesia

Scientific classification
- Kingdom: Animalia
- Phylum: Arthropoda
- Class: Insecta
- Order: Hymenoptera
- Family: Formicidae
- Subfamily: Myrmicinae
- Tribe: Crematogastrini
- Genus: Vombisidris; Bolton, 1991

Type species
- Vombisidris philax Bolton, 1991

Diversity
- 16 species

= Vombisidris =

Genus of ants

Vombisidris is a genus of subarboreal and arboreal ants in the subfamily Myrmicinae. Its species are known from India to Queensland, Australia. Like most other arboreal ants, their biology remains unknown.

== Species ==
- Vombisidris acherdos Bolton, 1991
- Vombisidris australis (Wheeler, 1934)
- Vombisidris bilongrudi (Taylor, 1989)
- Vombisidris dryas Bolton, 1991
- Vombisidris harpeza Bolton, 1991
- Vombisidris humboldticola Zacharias & Rajan, 2004
- Vombisidris jacobsoni (Forel, 1915)
- Vombisidris lochme Bolton, 1991
- Vombisidris nahet Bolton, 1991
- Vombisidris occidua Bolton, 1991
- Vombisidris philax Bolton, 1991
- Vombisidris philippina Zettel & Sorger, 2010
- Vombisidris regina Bolton, 1991
- Vombisidris renateae (Taylor, 1989)
- Vombisidris umbrabdomina Huang & Zhou, 2006
- Vombisidris xylochos Bolton, 1991
