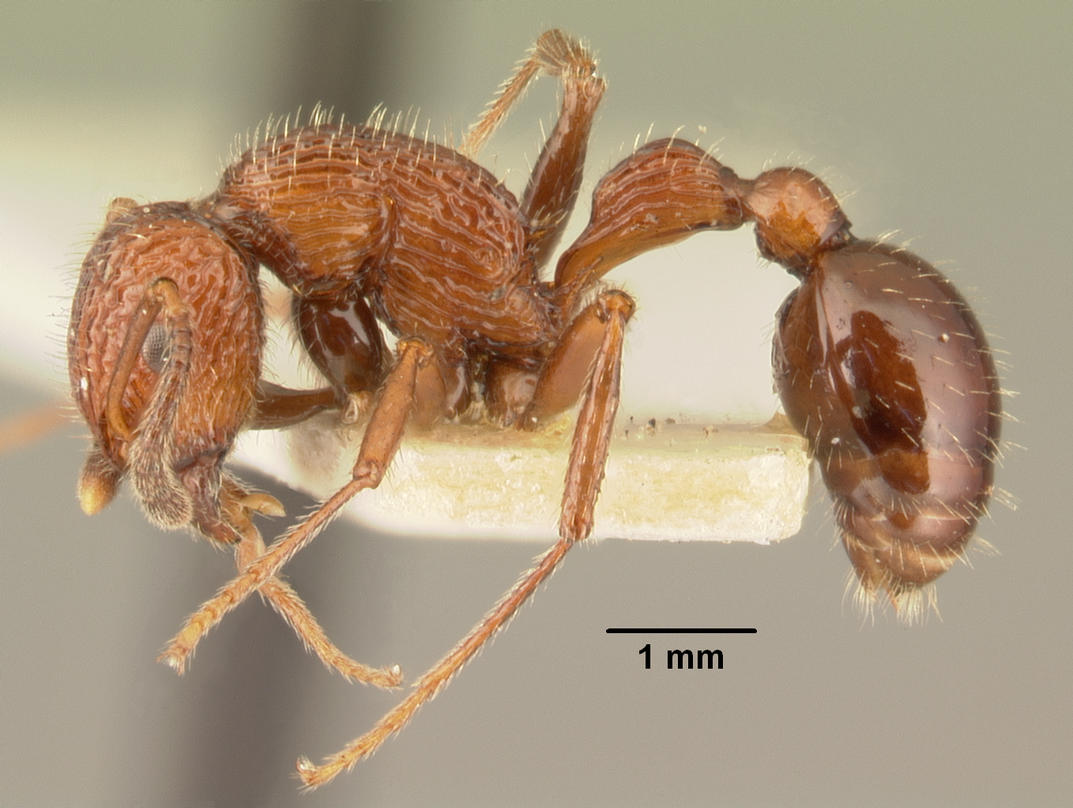
- Poecilomyrma senirewae worker

Scientific classification
- Domain: Eukaryota
- Kingdom: Animalia
- Phylum: Arthropoda
- Class: Insecta
- Order: Hymenoptera
- Family: Formicidae
- Subfamily: Myrmicinae
- Tribe: Crematogastrini
- Genus: Poecilomyrma; Mann, 1921

Type species
- Poecilomyrma senirewae Mann, 1921

Diversity
- 2 species

= Poecilomyrma =

Genus of ants

Poecilomyrma is a genus of ants in the subfamily Myrmicinae. Its two species are restricted to the Fijian archipelago. Although rare, the genus is known from all seven of the largest islands of Fiji.

== Species ==
- Poecilomyrma myrmecodiae Mann, 1921
- Poecilomyrma senirewae Mann, 1921
