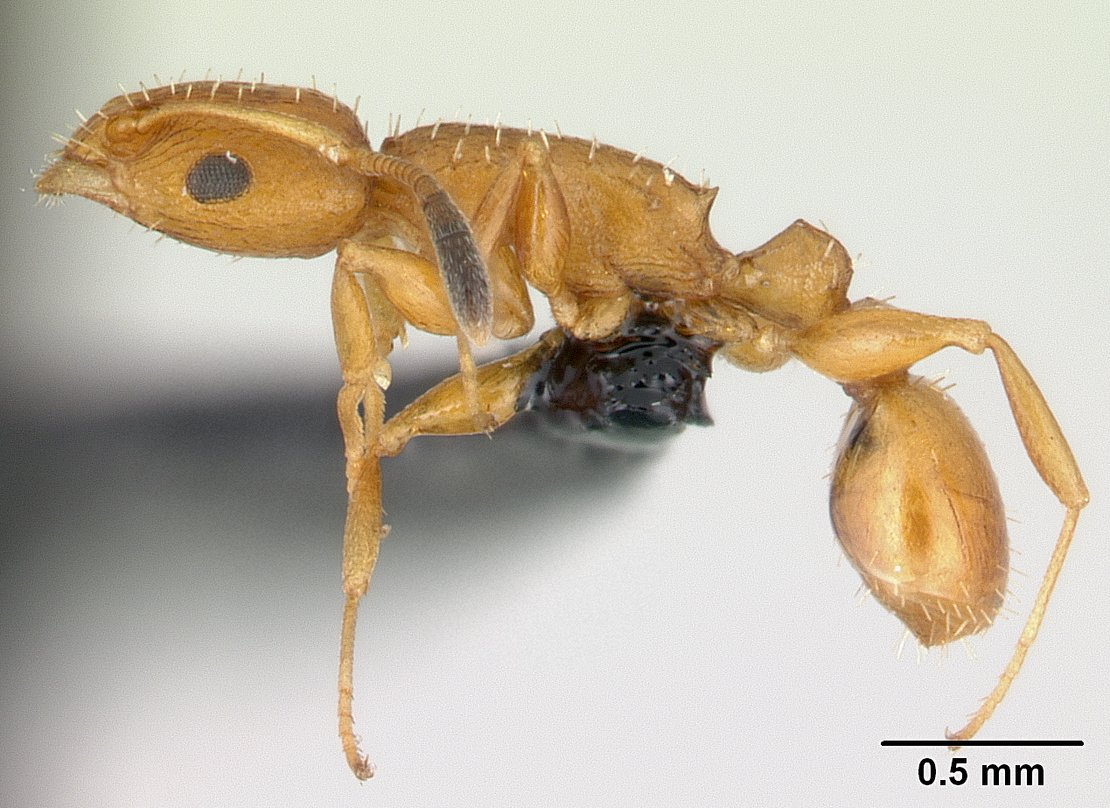
- Nesomyrmex angulatus worker from Madagascar

Scientific classification
- Kingdom: Animalia
- Phylum: Arthropoda
- Class: Insecta
- Order: Hymenoptera
- Family: Formicidae
- Subfamily: Myrmicinae
- Tribe: Crematogastrini
- Genus: Nesomyrmex; Wheeler, 1910

Type species
- Nesomyrmex clavipilis Wheeler, 1910

Diversity
- 83 species

Synonyms
- Caulomyrma Forel, 1914; Goniothorax Emery, 1896; Ireneopone Donisthorpe, 1946; Limnomyrmex Arnold, 1948; Meia Pagliano & Scaramozzino, 1990; Tetramyrma Forel, 1912

= Nesomyrmex =

Genus of ants

Nesomyrmex is a genus of ants in the subfamily Myrmicinae. The genus is distributed in the Neotropical, Afrotropical and Malagasy regions. Most species live in arid climates, but some are known from the rainforest. They nest in soil or in trees. Little is known about their biology.

== Species ==
- Nesomyrmex anduzei (Weber, 1943)
- Nesomyrmex angulatus (Mayr, 1862)
- Nesomyrmex antoinetteae Mbanyana & Robertson, 2008
- Nesomyrmex antoniensis (Forel, 1912)
- Nesomyrmex argentinus (Santschi, 1922)
- Nesomyrmex asper (Mayr, 1887)
- Nesomyrmex bidentatus Csösz & Fisher, 2016
- Nesomyrmex brasiliensis (Kempf, 1958)
- Nesomyrmex braunsi (Forel, 1912)
- Nesomyrmex brevicornis Csösz & Fisher, 2016
- Nesomyrmex brimodus (Bolton, 1995)
- Nesomyrmex brunneus Csösz & Fisher, 2016
- Nesomyrmex capricornis Csösz & Fisher, 2015
- †Nesomyrmex caritatis (De Andrade, Baroni Urbani, Brandão & Wagensberg, 1999)
- Nesomyrmex cataulacoides (Snelling, 1992)
- Nesomyrmex cederbergensis Mbanyana & Robertson, 2008
- Nesomyrmex cingulatus Csösz & Fisher, 2016
- Nesomyrmex clavipilis Wheeler, 1910
- Nesomyrmex clypeatus Csösz & Fisher, 2016
- Nesomyrmex costatus (Emery, 1896)
- Nesomyrmex denticulatus (Mayr, 1901)
- Nesomyrmex devius Csösz & Fisher, 2016
- †Nesomyrmex dominicanus (De Andrade, Baroni Urbani, Brandão & Wagensberg, 1999)
- Nesomyrmex echinatinodis (Forel, 1886)
- Nesomyrmex edentatus Csösz & Fisher, 2016
- Nesomyrmex entabeni Mbanyana & Robertson, 2008
- Nesomyrmex evelynae (Forel, 1916)
- Nesomyrmex excelsior Csösz & Fisher, 2016
- Nesomyrmex exiguus Csösz & Fisher, 2016
- Nesomyrmex ezantsi Mbanyana & Robertson, 2008
- Nesomyrmex flavigaster Csösz & Fisher, 2016
- Nesomyrmex flavus Csösz & Fisher, 2016
- Nesomyrmex fragilis Csösz & Fisher, 2016
- Nesomyrmex gibber (Donisthorpe, 1946)
- Nesomyrmex gracilis Csösz & Fisher, 2016
- Nesomyrmex grisoni (Forel, 1916)
- Nesomyrmex hafahafa Csösz & Fisher, 2015
- Nesomyrmex hirtellus Csösz & Fisher, 2016
- Nesomyrmex humerosus (Emery, 1896)
- Nesomyrmex inhaca Hita Garcia, Mbanyana, Audisio & Alpert, 2017
- Nesomyrmex innocens (Forel, 1913)
- Nesomyrmex inye Mbanyana & Robertson, 2008
- Nesomyrmex itinerans (Kempf, 1959)
- Nesomyrmex karooensis Mbanyana & Robertson, 2008
- Nesomyrmex koebergensis Mbanyana & Robertson, 2008
- Nesomyrmex larsenae Mbanyana & Robertson, 2008
- Nesomyrmex longiceps Csösz & Fisher, 2016
- Nesomyrmex madecassus (Forel, 1892)
- Nesomyrmex mcgregori Mbanyana & Robertson, 2008
- Nesomyrmex medusus Csösz & Fisher, 2015
- Nesomyrmex minutus Csösz & Fisher, 2016
- Nesomyrmex mirassolis (Diniz, 1975)
- Nesomyrmex modestus Csösz & Fisher, 2016
- Nesomyrmex nanniae Mbanyana & Robertson, 2008
- Nesomyrmex nitidus Csösz & Fisher, 2016
- Nesomyrmex njengelanga Mbanyana & Robertson, 2008
- Nesomyrmex pittieri (Forel, 1899)
- Nesomyrmex pleuriticus (Kempf, 1959)
- Nesomyrmex punctaticeps Csösz & Fisher, 2016
- Nesomyrmex pulcher (Emery, 1917)
- Nesomyrmex reticulatus Csösz & Fisher, 2016
- Nesomyrmex retusispinosus (Forel, 1892)
- Nesomyrmex ruani Mbanyana & Robertson, 2008
- Nesomyrmex rugosus Csösz & Fisher, 2016
- Nesomyrmex rutilans (Kempf, 1958)
- Nesomyrmex saasveldensis Mbanyana & Robertson, 2008
- Nesomyrmex schwebeli (Forel, 1913)
- Nesomyrmex sculptiventris (Mayr, 1887)
- Nesomyrmex sellaris Csösz & Fisher, 2016
- Nesomyrmex sikorai (Emery, 1896)
- Nesomyrmex simoni (Emery, 1895)
- Nesomyrmex spininodis (Mayr, 1887)
- Nesomyrmex spinosus Csösz & Fisher, 2015
- Nesomyrmex stramineus (Arnold, 1948)
- Nesomyrmex striatus Csösz & Fisher, 2016
- Nesomyrmex tamatavensis Csösz & Fisher, 2016
- Nesomyrmex tonsuratus (Kempf, 1959)
- Nesomyrmex tshiguvhoae Mbanyana & Robertson, 2008
- Nesomyrmex vannoorti Mbanyana & Robertson, 2008
- Nesomyrmex vargasi Longino, 2006
- Nesomyrmex vicinus (Mayr, 1887)
- Nesomyrmex wilda (Smith, 1943)
- Nesomyrmex zaheri Sharaf, Akbar & Hita Garcia 2017
