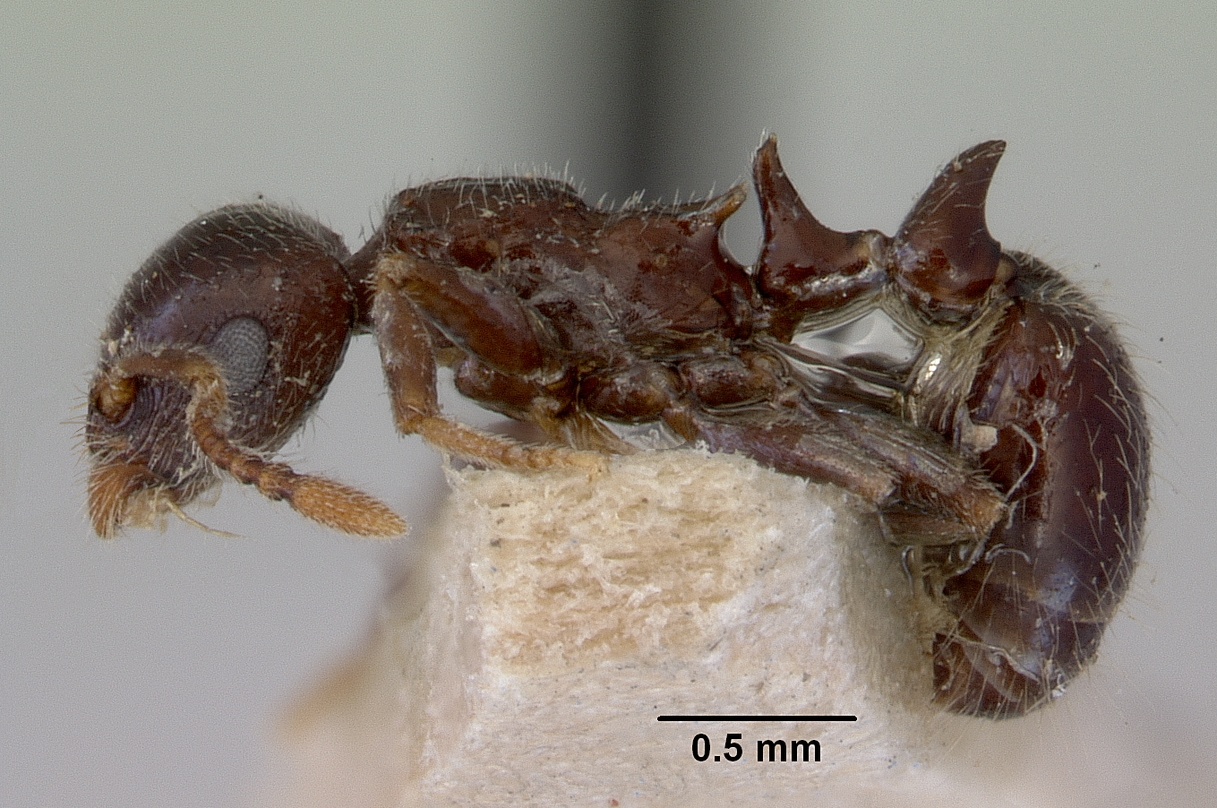
- Peronomyrmex greavesi worker from Australia

Scientific classification
- Kingdom: Animalia
- Phylum: Arthropoda
- Class: Insecta
- Order: Hymenoptera
- Family: Formicidae
- Subfamily: Myrmicinae
- Tribe: Crematogastrini
- Genus: Peronomyrmex; Viehmeyer, 1922

Type species
- Peronomyrmex overbecki Viehmeyer, 1922

Diversity
- 3 species

= Peronomyrmex =

Genus of ants

Peronomyrmex is a rare genus of ants in the subfamily Myrmicinae. Its three species are known from the east coast of Australia. With only five specimens in total, collected from four localities, Peronomyrmex is one of the world's most rare ant genera.

Peronomyrmex was first described with the type species P. overbecki by Emery (1920), based on a single worker from New South Wales. The genus remained monotypic until 2002 when Shattuck & Hinkley described P. bartoni from central Victoria. Shattuck (2006) described a third species, P. greavesi from northern Queensland. The P. greavesi specimen was originally collected in 1937, but subsequently placed in the collections of the Museum of Comparative Zoology, Cambridge, United States, where it remained until it was rediscovered in 2004.

Little is known about their biology, but they are likely nocturnal, arboreal, and have cryptic habits, which partially explains their infrequent collection. More species of this genus are likely to be discovered in the future.

== Species ==
- Peronomyrmex bartoni Shattuck & Hinkley, 2002 – Victoria
- Peronomyrmex greavesi Shattuck, 2006 – Queensland
- Peronomyrmex overbecki Viehmeyer, 1922 – New South Wales and Queensland
