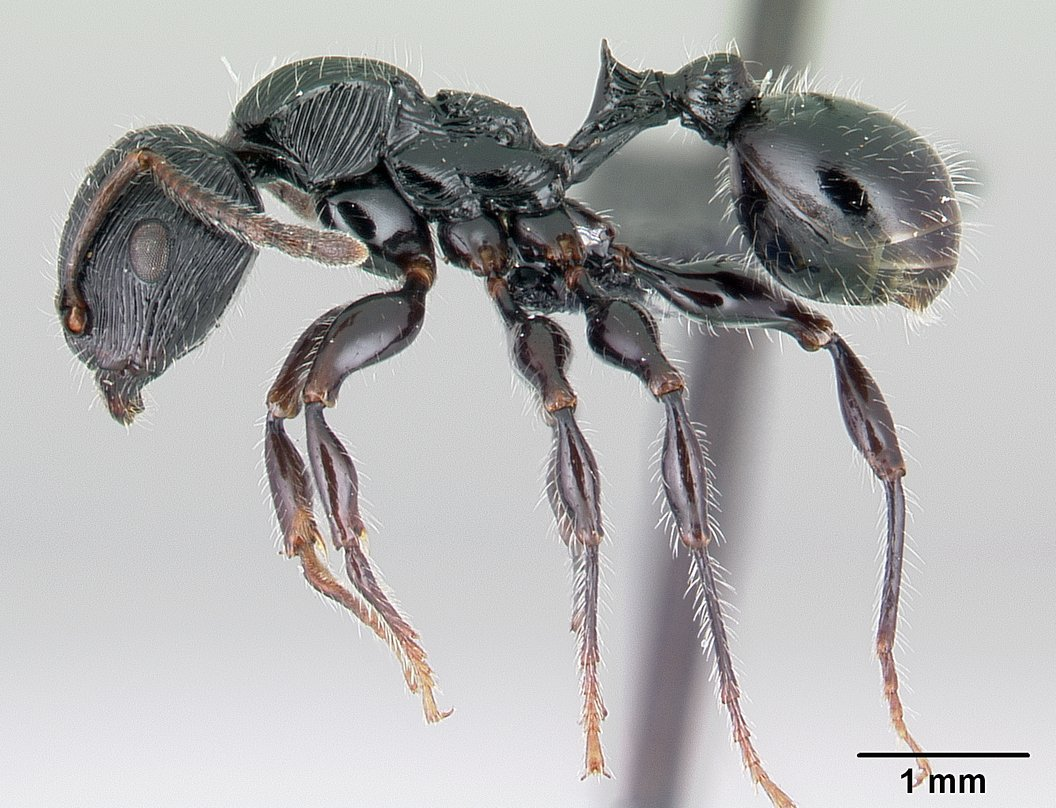
- Terataner steinheili worker

Scientific classification
- Kingdom: Animalia
- Phylum: Arthropoda
- Class: Insecta
- Order: Hymenoptera
- Family: Formicidae
- Subfamily: Myrmicinae
- Tribe: Crematogastrini
- Genus: Terataner; Emery, 1912

Type species
- Atopomyrmex foreli Emery, 1899

Diversity
- 12 species

Synonyms
- Tranetera Arnold, 1952

= Terataner =

Genus of ants

Terataner is an African genus of arboreal ants in the subfamily Myrmicinae.

== Distribution ==
The genus is can be separated into two groups based on distribution and behavior. Both groups are known from the Afrotropics, with the west African group nesting in rotten parts of standing trees, often high above the ground. The other group, consisting of species from east Africa, Madagascar and one from South Africa, nests in cavities of plants near the ground.

== Species ==
- Terataner alluaudi (Emery, 1895)
- Terataner balrog (Hita, 2017)
- Terataner bottegoi (Emery, 1896)
- Terataner elegans Bernard, 1953
- Terataner foreli (Emery, 1899)
- Terataner luteus (Emery, 1899)
- Terataner piceus Menozzi, 1942
- Terataner rufipes Emery, 1912
- Terataner scotti (Forel, 1912)
- Terataner steinheili (Forel, 1895)
- Terataner transvaalensis Arnold, 1952
- Terataner velatus Bolton, 1981
- Terataner xaltus Bolton, 1981
