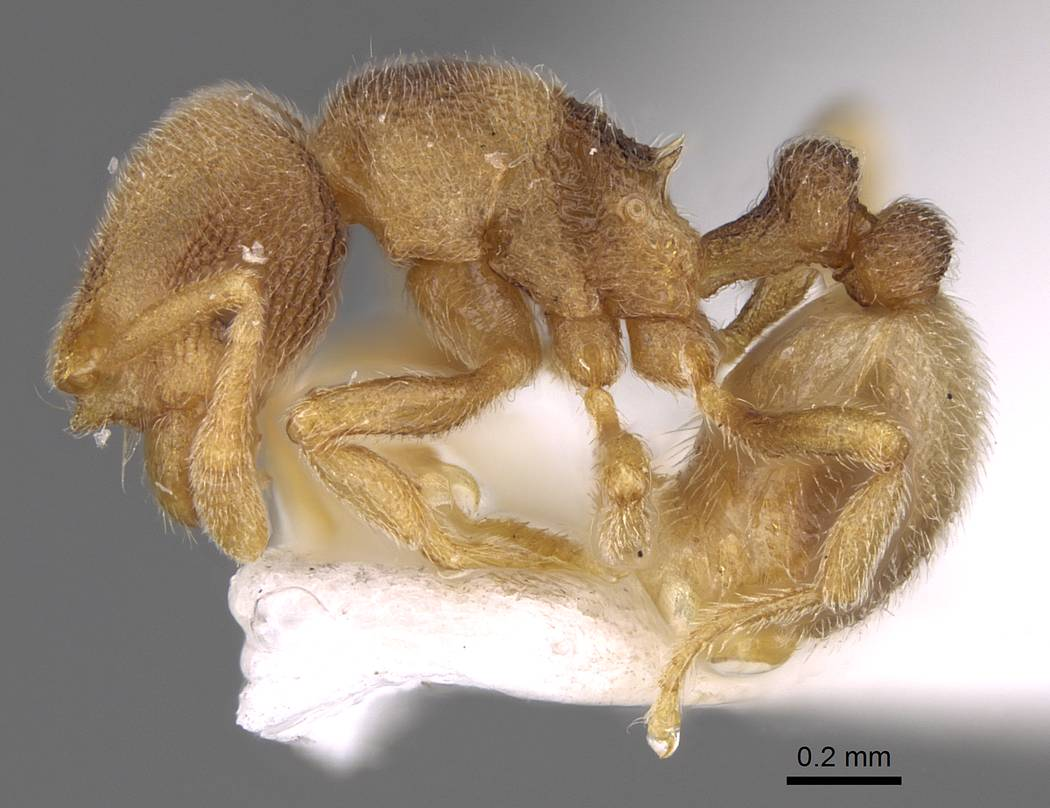

Scientific classification
- Domain: Eukaryota
- Kingdom: Animalia
- Phylum: Arthropoda
- Class: Insecta
- Order: Hymenoptera
- Family: Formicidae
- Subfamily: Myrmicinae
- Tribe: Crematogastrini
- Genus: Formosimyrma; Terayama, 2009
- Species: F. lanuyensis

Binomial name
- Formosimyrma lanuyensis Terayama, 2009

= Formosimyrma =

Genus of ants

Formosimyrma is a genus of ants in the subfamily Myrmicinae containing the single species Formosimyrma lanuyensis.

== Distribution and habitat ==
The genus is known only from Taiwan, where it was first collected in an evergreen forest on Lanyu Island.

== Etymology ==
The genus name is derived from Formosa (old name of Taiwan) + myrma (Greek, "ant"); the specific name of the type species (F. lanuyensis) is derived from the type locality.
