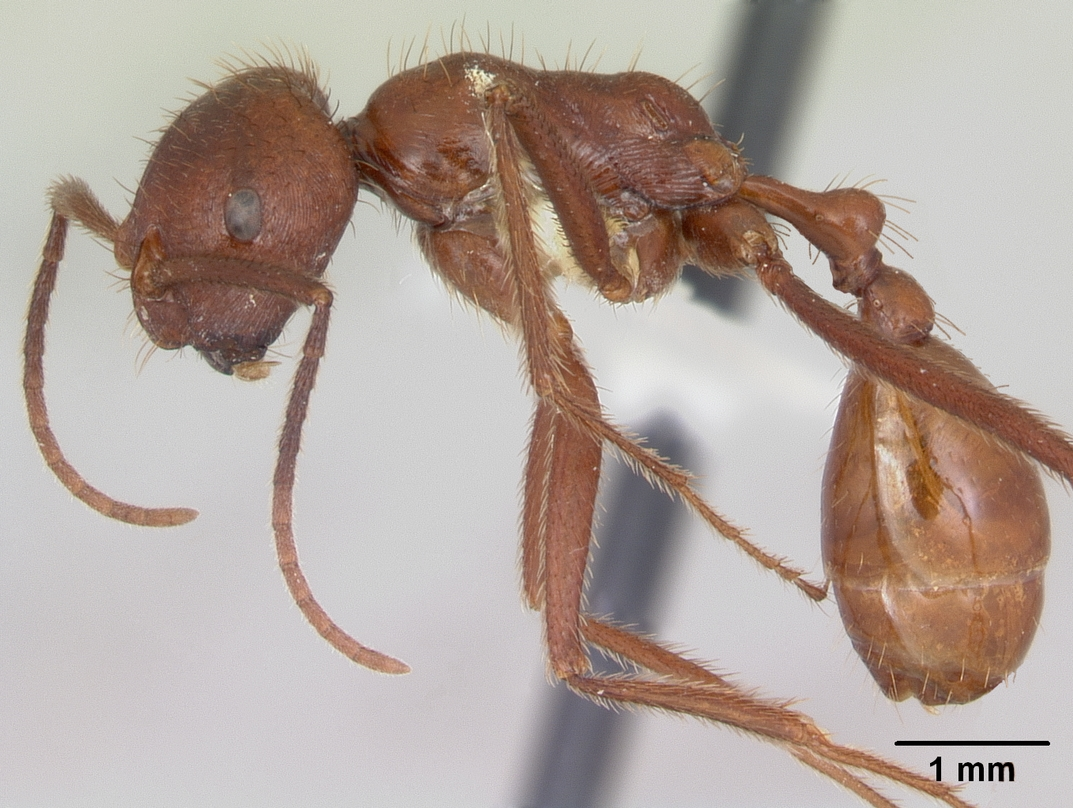
- Ocymyrmex ankhu ergatoid queen

Scientific classification
- Kingdom: Animalia
- Phylum: Arthropoda
- Clade: Pancrustacea
- Class: Insecta
- Order: Hymenoptera
- Family: Formicidae
- Subfamily: Myrmicinae
- Tribe: Crematogastrini
- Alliance: Cataulacus genus group
- Genus: Ocymyrmex; Emery, 1886

Type species
- Ocymyrmex barbiger Emery, 1886

Diversity
- 37 species

= Ocymyrmex =

Genus of ants

Ocymyrmex is an African genus of ants in the subfamily Myrmicinae, also commonly known as hotrod ants.

== Distribution and habitat ==
Species are thermophilic (thrives at relatively high temperatures) and live in dry savanna to extreme desert conditions in parts of the Afrotropics. They seem to be restricted to Southern and Eastern Africa, with no species occurring in West and Central Africa, or the sub-Saharan Sahelian Zone. Their nests are located deep in the ground, usually in sandy soil, with colonies consisting of 200 to 1000 individuals. Adapted to arid climates, they move remarkably fast during the day. They feed mainly on corpses of heat-stricken animals, living termites and seeds.

== Species ==
- Ocymyrmex afradu Bolton & Marsh, 1989
- Ocymyrmex alacer Bolton & Marsh, 1989
- Ocymyrmex ankhu Bolton, 1981
- Ocymyrmex barbiger Emery, 1886
- Ocymyrmex cavatodorsatus Prins, 1965
- Ocymyrmex celer Weber, 1943
- Ocymyrmex cilliei Bolton & Marsh, 1989
- Ocymyrmex cursor Bolton, 1981
- Ocymyrmex dekerus Bolton & Marsh, 1989
- Ocymyrmex engytachys Bolton & Marsh, 1989
- Ocymyrmex flavescens Stitz, 1923
- Ocymyrmex flaviventris Santschi, 1914
- Ocymyrmex foreli Arnold, 1916
- Ocymyrmex fortior Santschi, 1911
- Ocymyrmex gariepensis Bolton & Marsh, 1989
- Ocymyrmex gordoni Bolton & Marsh, 1989
- Ocymyrmex hirsutus Forel, 1910
- Ocymyrmex ignotus Bolton & Marsh, 1989
- Ocymyrmex kahas Bolton & Marsh, 1989
- Ocymyrmex laticeps Forel, 1901
- Ocymyrmex micans Forel, 1910
- Ocymyrmex monardi Santschi, 1930
- Ocymyrmex nitidulus Emery, 1892
- Ocymyrmex okys Bolton & Marsh, 1989
- Ocymyrmex phraxus Bolton, 1981
- Ocymyrmex picardi Forel, 1901
- Ocymyrmex resekhes Bolton & Marsh, 1989
- Ocymyrmex robecchii Emery, 1892
- Ocymyrmex robustior Stitz, 1923
- Ocymyrmex shushan Bolton, 1981
- Ocymyrmex sobek Bolton, 1981
- Ocymyrmex sphinx Bolton, 1981
- Ocymyrmex tachys Bolton & Marsh, 1989
- Ocymyrmex turneri Donisthorpe, 1931
- Ocymyrmex velox Santschi, 1932
- Ocymyrmex weitzeckeri Emery, 1892
- Ocymyrmex zekhem Bolton, 1981
