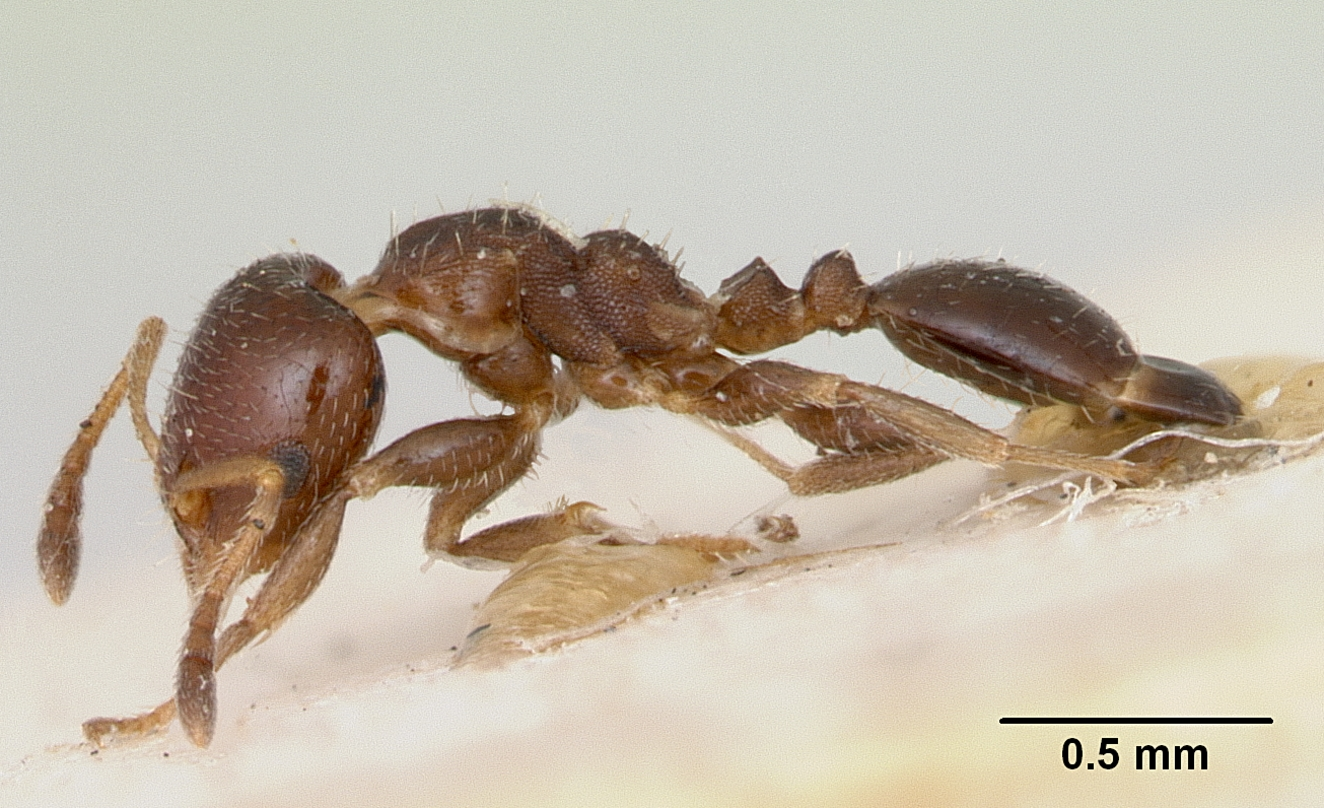
- Gauromyrmex bengakalisi worker from Indonesia

Scientific classification
- Domain: Eukaryota
- Kingdom: Animalia
- Phylum: Arthropoda
- Class: Insecta
- Order: Hymenoptera
- Family: Formicidae
- Subfamily: Myrmicinae
- Tribe: Crematogastrini
- Genus: Gauromyrmex; Menozzi, 1933

Type species
- Gauromyrmex bengakalisi Menozzi, 1933

Diversity
- 2 species

Synonyms
- Acalama Smith, 1949; Solenomyrma Karavaiev, 1935

= Gauromyrmex =

Genus of ants

Gauromyrmex is a genus of ants in the subfamily Myrmicinae. The genus contains two species, known from the Indomalayan realm. According to Bolton (2003), there are a further five or six undescribed species in the collections of the Natural History Museum in London.

== Species ==
- Gauromyrmex acanthinus (Karavaiev, 1935)
- Gauromyrmex bengakalisi Menozzi, 1933
