= Malagidris =

Scientific classification
- Kingdom: Animalia
- Phylum: Arthropoda
- Class: Insecta
- Order: Hymenoptera
- Family: Formicidae
- Subfamily: Myrmicinae
- Tribe: Crematogastrini
- Genus: Malagidris; Bolton & Fisher, 2014

Type species
- Aphaenogaster belti Forel, 1895

Diversity
- 6 species

Synonyms
- Brunella Forel, 1917

Genus of ants

Malagidris is a Malagasy genus of ants in the subfamily Myrmicinae. Described in 2014, the genus contains six species.

== Species ==
- Malagidris alperti Bolton & Fisher, 2014
- Malagidris belti (Forel, 1895)
- Malagidris dulcis Bolton & Fisher, 2014
- Malagidris galokoa Bolton & Fisher, 2014
- Malagidris jugum Bolton & Fisher, 2014
- Malagidris sofina Bolton & Fisher, 2014

== Taxonomy ==
The type species of this genus, M. belti (Forel, 1895), has had a moderately varied taxonomic history. It was originally described in the genus Aphaenogaster (Mayr, 1853), even though Forel remarked on its 3-segmented antennal club, rather than 4 as is usual in that genus. This character, coupled with the presence of angulate humeri and a queen with a depressed mesosoma, caused Emery (1915) to exclude M. belti from Aphaenogaster and transfer it to Atopula (Emery, 1912). Forel (1917) decided that Atopula was artificial, "composed of disparate species," and established the genus Brunella to include only M. belti. The component species of Atopula were later dispersed to other genera by Bolton (1976), who retained genus Brunella as its "affinities are unclear." Later however, Bolton (1982) synonymised Brunella under Aphaenogaster, thus returning M. belti to its original generic combination.

More extensive recent sampling of the Madagascan ant fauna has made it clear that this synonymy was incorrect. The discovery of several species referable to Forel's Brunella has allowed the diagnosis of a distinct group of Madagascan endemics, which are convergent in some characters with Aphaenogaster but certainly not congeneric with it. The final act of this history has been the realisation that Brunella (Forel, 1917) is the junior homonym of a crustacean genus Brunella (G.W. Smith, 1909), from Tasmania. No replacement name was essential for Brunella (Forel, 1917) while it was a junior synonym, but after it was revived from synonymy a replacement name was necessary: Malagidris.

== Identification ==
The larger, more gracile species (e.g. M. alperti, M. galokoa, M. jugum, M. sofina) of Malagidris are remarkably convergent on the widely distributed genus Aphaenogaster. However, all species of Malagidris have two critical features never exhibited by Aphaenogaster species. First, the midpoint of the anterior clypeal margin of Malagidris has a single, stout, unpaired seta. In Aphaenogaster there is always a conspicuous pair of setae, one on each side of the midpoint of the anterior clypeal margin. Second, Aphaenogaster species do not have the characteristic structure of the anteroventral peduncle of the petiole. In addition to these, Malagidris always has the following: a transverse crest present on the stipes of the maxilla; a 3-segmented antennal club; a subpetiolar process present; a strongly developed sting; the anterior clypeal margin convex at the midpoint. In Aphaenogaster, by contrast, the stipes usually lacks a crest (a crest is incompletely and weaky developed in a few species, strong only in A. relicta, from Haiti, which may not be properly referable to Aphaenogaster), usually has a 4-segmented antennal club (5-segmented to gradually incrassate in some species but never 3-segmented), lacks a subpetiolar process, has a very weakly developed or vestigial sting, and usually (but not always) has the midpoint of the anterior clypeal margin concave or indented.
