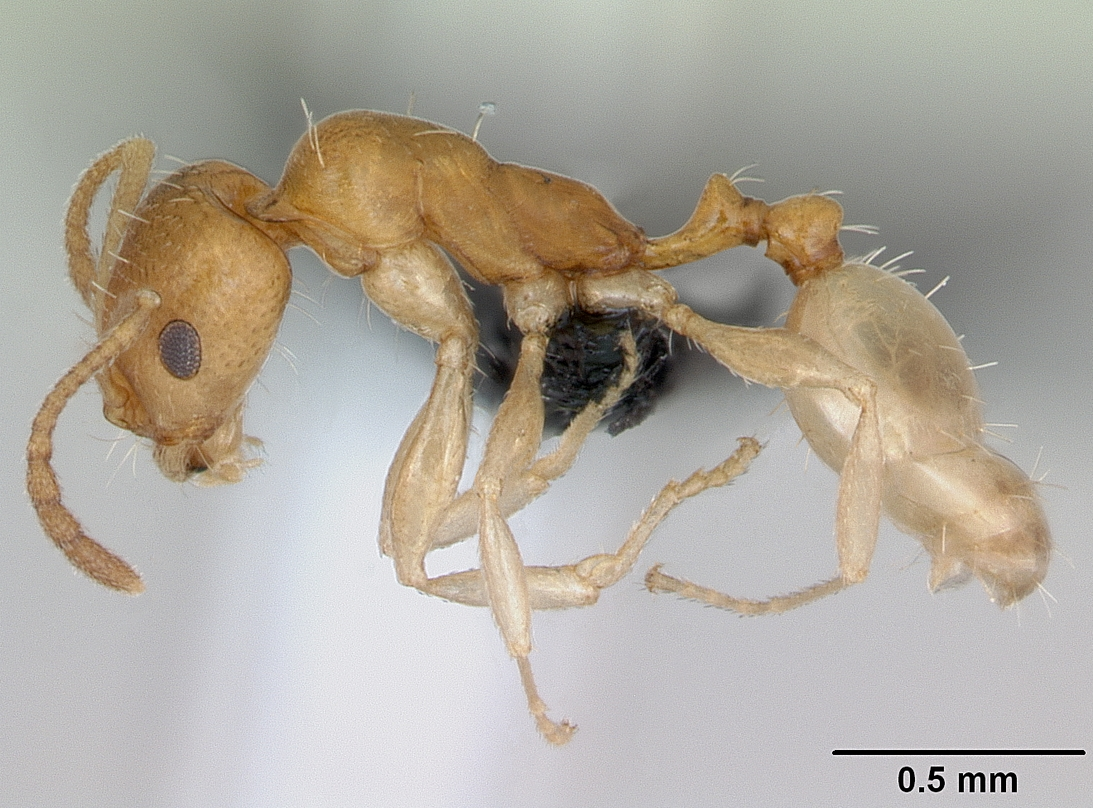
- Royidris robertsoni worker

Scientific classification
- Kingdom: Animalia
- Phylum: Arthropoda
- Class: Insecta
- Order: Hymenoptera
- Family: Formicidae
- Subfamily: Myrmicinae
- Tribe: Crematogastrini
- Genus: Royidris; Bolton & Fisher, 2014

Type species
- Monomorium robertsoni Heterick, 2006

Diversity
- 15 species

= Royidris =

Genus of ants

Royidris is a Malagasy genus of ants in the subfamily Myrmicinae. Described in 2014, the genus contains 15 species endemic to Madagascar.

== Description ==
Queens are known for R. admixta, R. diminuta, R. notorthotenes, R. peregrina, and R. shuckardi, plus two unassociated forms. Alate when virgin, considerably larger than the worker. Males are known only for R. notorthotenes and R. peregrina. About the same size as the worker or slightly smaller, much smaller than the queen.

== Taxonomy ==
The species included in this genus exhibit a habitus that is convergent on some groups of Monomorium. In his study of the Afrotropical members of that genus Bolton (1987) noted two indeterminate Madagascan species which had a high palp formula (5,3), the highest attributed to Monomorium, but did no further analysis of these odd species because the focus of the survey was the extensive Afrotropical fauna. Heterick (2006), in his revision of the Malagasy species of Monomorium, recognised the peculiarity of the high palp formula and utilised it, together with some other characters, to define his M. shuckardi group, all members of which are now transferred to Royidris. No unambiguous apomorphy can be stated for Royidris, and in fact its habitus is similar to that commonly seen in Monomorium.

== Species ==
admixta group

- Vitsika admixta Bolton & Fisher, 2014
- Vitsika depilosa Bolton & Fisher, 2014

robertsoni group

- Vitsika anxietas Bolton & Fisher, 2014
- Vitsika clarinodis (Heterick, 2006)
- Vitsika pallida Bolton & Fisher, 2014
- Vitsika pulchra Bolton & Fisher, 2014
- Vitsika robertsoni (Heterick, 2006)

notorthotenes group

- Vitsika diminuta Bolton & Fisher, 2014
- Vitsika etiolata Bolton & Fisher, 2014
- Vitsika gravipuncta Bolton & Fisher, 2014
- Vitsika longiseta Bolton & Fisher, 2014
- Vitsika notorthotenes (Heterick, 2006)
- Vitsika peregrina Bolton & Fisher, 2014
- Vitsika shuckardi (Forel, 1895)
- Vitsika singularis Bolton & Fisher, 2014
