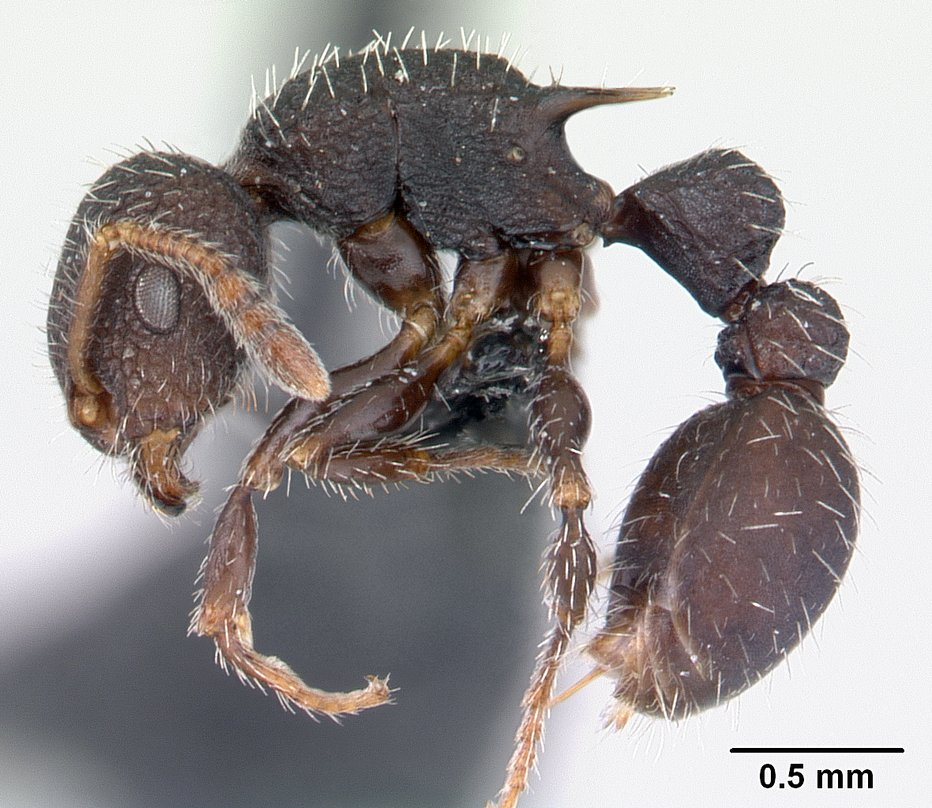
- Romblonella opaca worker

Scientific classification
- Kingdom: Animalia
- Phylum: Arthropoda
- Class: Insecta
- Order: Hymenoptera
- Family: Formicidae
- Subfamily: Myrmicinae
- Tribe: Crematogastrini
- Genus: Romblonella; Wheeler, 1935

Type species
- Rombonella grandinodis Wheeler, 1935

Diversity
- 8 species

= Romblonella =

Genus of ants

Romblonella is a genus of myrmicine ants.

== Systematics ==
Romblonella is probably the sister taxon to Stereomyrmex. Closely related genera are Leptothorax and Cardiocondyla.

== Biology ==
Very little is known about these uncommon ants. Most species were found to nest in twigs on trees and to forage on low vegetation.

== Description ==
R. opaca: a) lateral view; b) head, dorsal view; c) thorax and petiole, dorsal view

Workers of R. opaca are about 4 mm long. They have a small sting. R. opaca was described from four specimens found on Romblon Island, Philippines, by Wheeler (1935). However, the species had already been described by F. Smith in 1861 as Myrmica opaca, which had been collected at Tondano, Sulawesi by Alfred Russel Wallace.

R. elysii workers are 2 mm long. They were originally described as Crematogaster from a few workers from the Solomon Islands. R. heatwolei workers are almost 4 mm long.

Only for R. palauensis and R. heatwolei have males been described.

== Distribution ==
Romblonella is found from the Philippines south through New Guinea, with one species known from Australia. The distribution stretches to the islands of the western South Pacific.

== Name ==
The genus is named after the locality where the type species was found.

== Species ==
- Romblonella elysii (Mann, 1919) — Malapina, Big Nggela: Solomon Islands
- Romblonella heatwolei Taylor, 1991 — Wyer Island: Torres Strait: Queensland: Australia
- Romblonella opaca (F. Smith, 1861) — Philippines, Indonesia
- Romblonella palauensis M. R. Smith, 1953 — Auluptagel, Urukthapal, Babelthaub: Palau: Caroline Islands
- Romblonella scrobifera (Emery, 1897) — Aitape, Manus Province, East Sepik Province, Morobe Province, East New Britain Province: New Guinea
- Romblonella townesi M. R. Smith, 1953 — Mount Lasso: Tinian Island: Northern Mariana Islands
- Romblonella vitiensis M. R. Smith, 1953 — Wakaya Island: Fiji Islands
- Romblonella yapensis M. R. Smith, 1953 — Yap Island: Caroline Islands

== Images ==
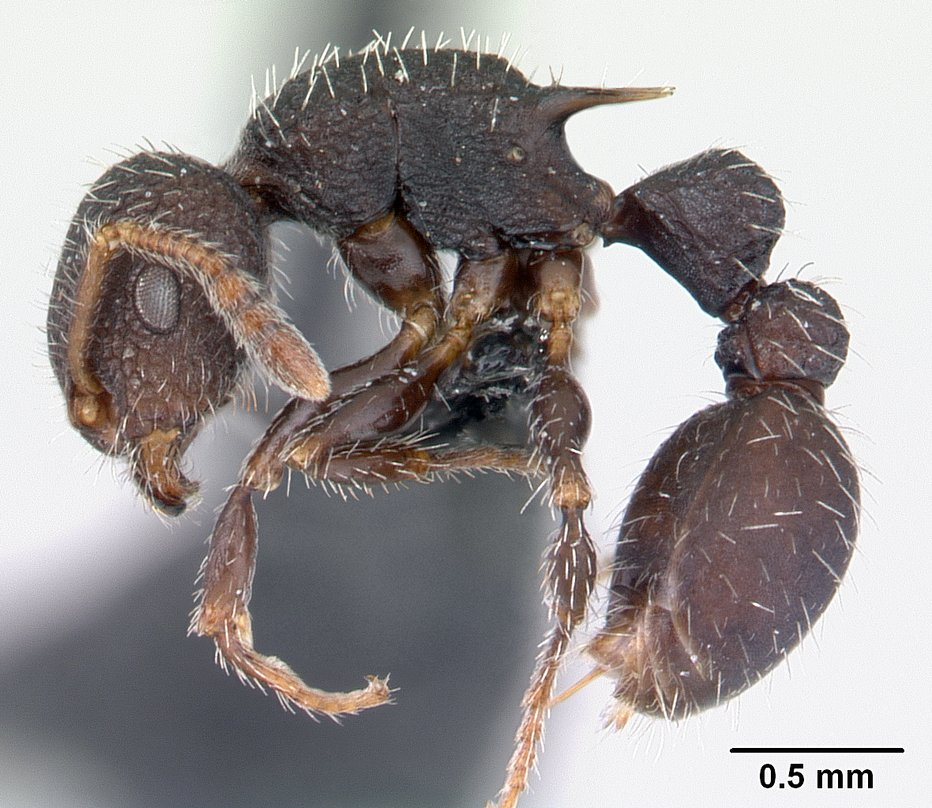
Specimen of a Romblonella opaca

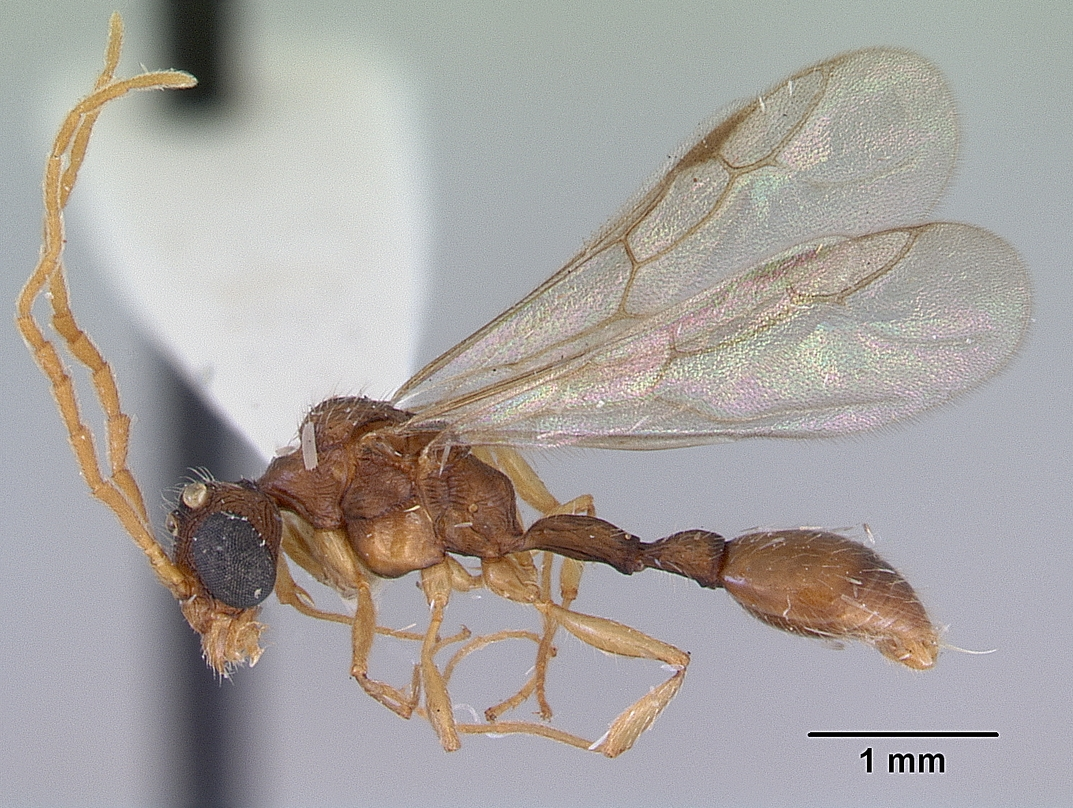
Specimen of a Romblonella palauensis

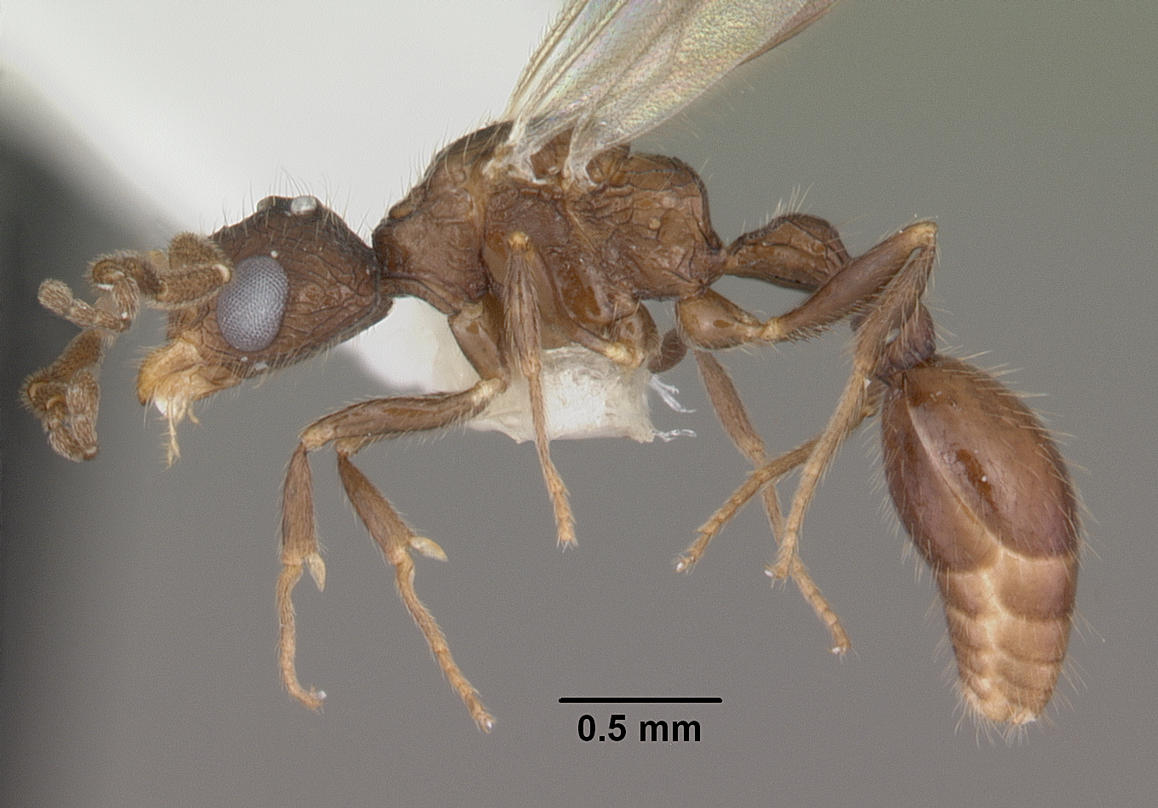
Specimen of a Romblonella scrobifera
