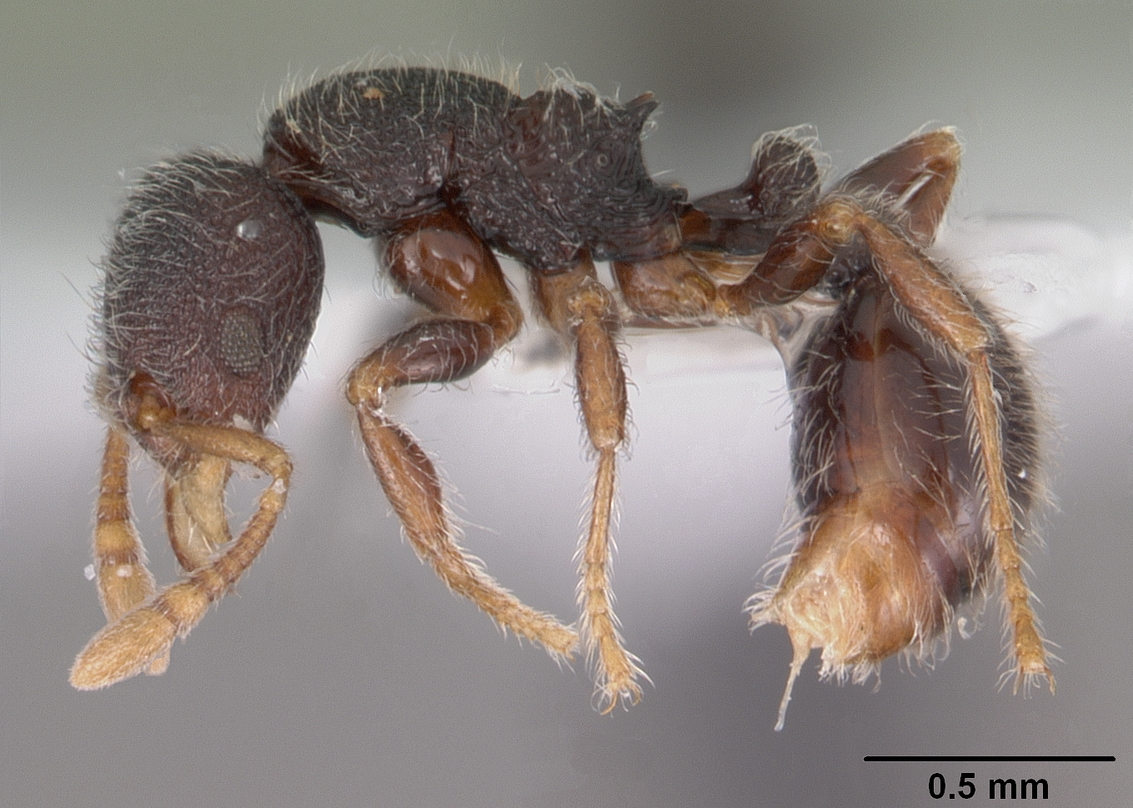
- Lasiomyrma gedensis worker

Scientific classification
- Kingdom: Animalia
- Phylum: Arthropoda
- Class: Insecta
- Order: Hymenoptera
- Family: Formicidae
- Subfamily: Myrmicinae
- Tribe: Crematogastrini
- Genus: Lasiomyrma; Terayama & Yamane, 2000

Type species
- Lasiomyrma gedensis Terayama & Yamane, 2000

Diversity
- 4 species

= Lasiomyrma =

Genus of ants

Lasiomyrma (from Greek lasio, "hairy" + myrma, "ant") is a South-East Asian genus of ants in the subfamily Myrmicinae. The genus is mainly known from tropical rainforests in Sundaland.

== Species ==
- Lasiomyrma gedensis Terayama & Yamane, 2000 – Java, Indonesia
- Lasiomyrma gracilinoda Terayama & Yamane, 2000 – Borneo, Malaysia
- Lasiomyrma maryatiae Terayama & Yamane, 2000 – Borneo, Malaysia
- Lasiomyrma wiwatwitayai Jaitrong, 2010 – Thailand
