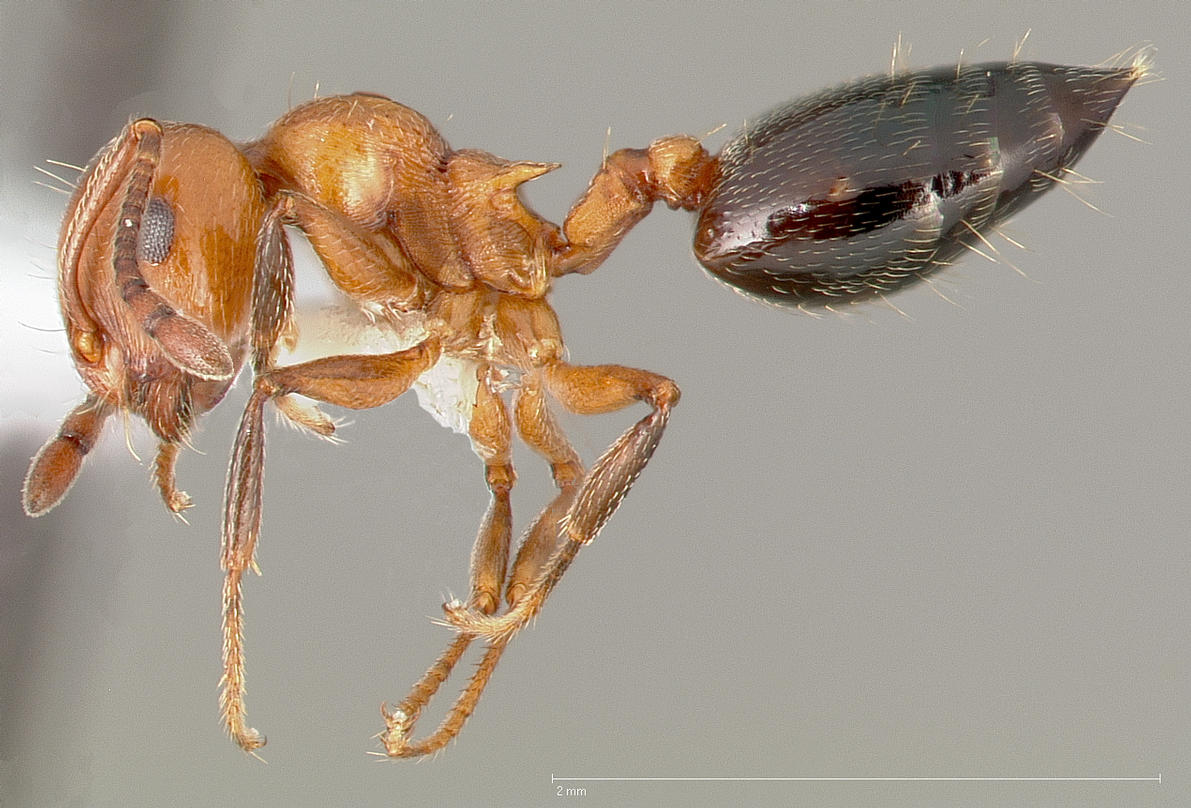
- Crematogaster hespera worker

Scientific classification
- Kingdom: Animalia
- Phylum: Arthropoda
- Class: Insecta
- Order: Hymenoptera
- Family: Formicidae
- Subfamily: Myrmicinae
- Tribe: Crematogastrini; Forel, 1893

Type genus
- Crematogaster Lund, 1831

Diversity
- c. 64 genera 8 fossil genera

= Crematogastrini =

Tribe of ants

Crematogastrini is a tribe of myrmicine ants with 64 genera and 8 fossil genera.

== Genera ==
=== Extant ===
Blaimer et al. performed a molecular analysis of the tribe in 2018 and created ten genus groups for the tribe, encompassing all but five extant genera. Of the five unplaced genera, Rostromyrmex is recovered to be sister to the rest of the tribe, however the genus group placements of the other four genera are uncertain as of 2026. These genus groups are also referred to as alliances. The Carebara and Mayriella genus groups were recovered monophyletic in the maximum likelihood analysis, but rendered paraphyletic in the species-tree analysis; the other eight species groups concurred with each other.

==== Cataulacus genus group ====
- Atopomyrmex André, 1889
- Cardiocondyla Emery, 1869
- Cataulacus Smith, 1853
- Nesomyrmex Wheeler, 1910
- Ocymyrmex Emery, 1886
- Terataner Emery, 1912
- Xenomyrmex Forel, 1885

==== Carebara genus group ====
- Calyptomyrmex Emery, 1887
- Carebara Westwood, 1840
- Cyphoidris Weber, 1952
- Dicroaspis Emery, 1908
- Diplomorium Mayr, 1901
- Melissotarsus Emery, 1877
- Rhopalomastix Forel, 1900
- Strongylognathus Mayr, 1853
- Tetramorium Mayr, 1855

==== Vollenhovia genus group ====
- Aretidris General, 2015
- Dacetinops Brown & Wilson, 1957
- Indomyrma Brown, 1986
- Vollenhovia Mayr, 1865

==== Podomyrma genus group ====
- Adlerzia Forel, 1902
- Eutetramorium Emery, 1899
- Huberia Forel, 1890
- Liomyrmex Mayr, 1865
- Lophomyrmex Emery, 1892
- Malagidris Bolton & Fisher, 2014
- Metapone Forel, 1911
- Podomyrma Smith, 1859
- Recurvidris Bolton, 1992
- Royidris Bolton & Fisher, 2014
- Stereomyrmex Emery, 1901
- Trichomyrmex Mayr, 1865
- Vitsika Bolton & Fisher, 2014

==== Crematogaster genus group ====
- Crematogaster Lund, 1831
- Meranoplus Smith, 1853

==== Mayriella genus group ====
- Dacatria Rigato, 1994
- Kartidris Bolton, 1991
- Mayriella Forel, 1902
- Proatta Forel, 1912
- Tetheamyrma Bolton, 1991

==== Myrmecina genus group ====
- Acanthomyrmex Emery, 1893
- Dilobocondyla Santschi, 1910
- Myrmecina Curtis, 1829
- Perissomyrmex Smith, 1947
- Pristomyrmex Mayr, 1866

==== Lordomyrma genus group ====
- Ancyridris Wheeler, 1935
- Lasiomyrma Terayama & Yamane, 2000
- Lordomyrma Emery, 1897
- Propodilobus Branstetter, 2009

==== Paratopula genus group ====
- Paratopula Wheeler, 1919
- Poecilomyrma Mann, 1921
- Romblonella Wheeler, 1935
- Rotastruma Bolton, 1991

==== Formicoxenus genus group ====
- Formicoxenus Mayr, 1855
- Gauromyrmex Menozzi, 1933
- Harpagoxenus Forel, 1893
- Leptothorax Mayr, 1855
- Temnothorax Mayr, 1861
- Vombisidris Bolton, 1991

==== Unplaced to genus group, placement known ====
- Rostromyrmex Rosciszewski, 1994

==== Unplaced to genus group, placement unknown ====
- Formosimyrma Terayama, 2009
- Gaoligongidris Xu, 2012
- Peronomyrmex Viehmeyer, 1922
- Secostruma Bolton, 1988

=== Extinct ===
- †Enneamerus Mayr, 1868
- †Eocenomyrma Dlussky & Radchenko, 2006
- †Hypopomyrmex Emery, 1891
- †Lonchomyrmex Mayr, 1867
- †Oxyidris Wilson, 1985
- †Parameranoplus Wheeler, 1915
- †Proleptothorax Radchenko et al., 2018
- †Stigmomyrmex Mayr, 1868
- †Stiphromyrmex Wheeler, 1915
- †Thanacomyrmex Chény et al., 2019
