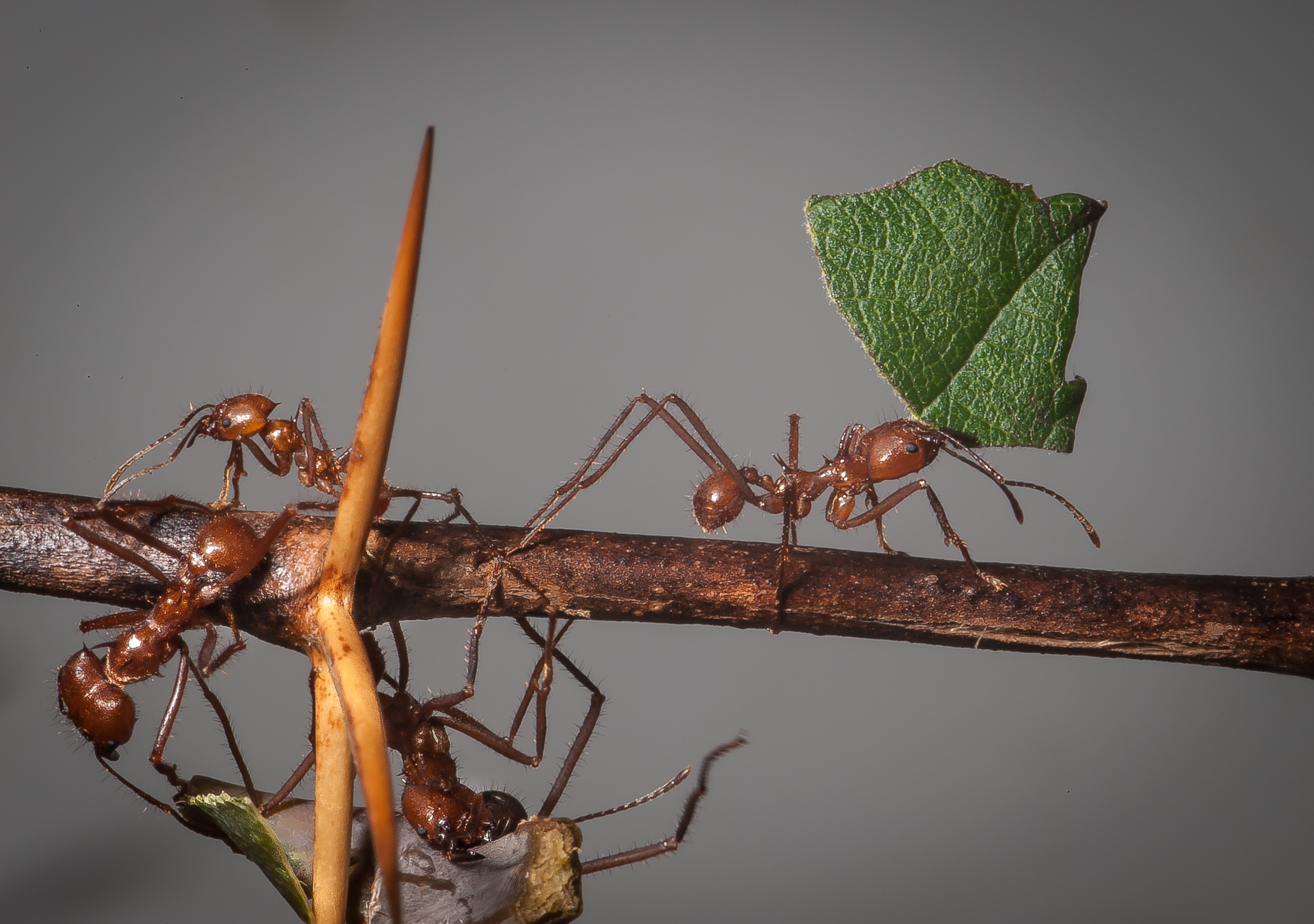
- Atta cephalotes

Scientific classification
- Kingdom: Animalia
- Phylum: Arthropoda
- Clade: Pancrustacea
- Class: Insecta
- Order: Hymenoptera
- Family: Formicidae
- Clade: Myrmicomorpha
- Subfamily: Myrmicinae; Lepeletier de Saint-Fargeau, 1835

Type genus
- Myrmica Latreiile, 1804

Diversity
- 142 genera

= Myrmicinae =

Myrmicinae Temporal range: Turonian–Recent

Subfamily of ants with cosmopolitan distribution whose pupae do not create cocoons

Myrmicinae is a subfamily of ants, with about 140 extant genera; their distribution is cosmopolitan. The pupae lack cocoons. Some species retain a functional sting. The petioles of Myrmicinae consist of two nodes. The nests are permanent and in soil, rotting wood, under stones, or in trees. All species of Cephalotes (within the tribe Attini) are gliding ants.

== Identification ==
Myrmicine worker ants have a distinct postpetiole, i.e., abdominal segment III is notably smaller than segment IV and set off from it by a well-developed constriction; the pronotum is inflexibly fused to the rest of the mesosoma, such that the promesonotal suture is weakly impressed or absent, and a functional sting is usually present. The clypeus is well-developed; as a result, the antennal sockets are well separated from the anterior margin of the head. Most myrmicine genera possess well-developed eyes and frontal lobes that partly conceal the antennal insertions.

== Tribes ==
In 2015, the number of tribes was reduced from 25 to six.

- Attini Smith, 1858
- Crematogastrini Forel, 1893
- Myrmicini Lepeletier de Saint-Fargeau, 1835
- Pogonomyrmecini Ward, Brady, Fisher & Schultz, 2015
- Solenopsidini Forel, 1893
- Stenammini Ashmead, 1905

== Phylogeny ==
The relationships between the six myrmicine tribes have been debated, and the most recent 2025 phylogeny is shown here.

- Myrmicinae
  - - Myrmicini
    - Pogonomyrmecini
  - - Stenammini
    - - Crematogastrini
      - - Attini
        - Solenopsidini

== Genera ==
In 2014, most genera were placed into different tribes or moved to other subfamilies. Below is an updated list:

- Attini Smith, 1858
  - Acanthognathus Mayr, 1887
  - Acromyrmex Mayr, 1865
  - Allomerus Mayr, 1878
  - Amoimyrmex Cristiano, Cardoso & Sandoval, 2020
  - Apterostigma Mayr, 1865
  - Atta Fabricius, 1804
  - †Attaichnus Laza, 1982
  - Basiceros Schulz, 1906
  - Blepharidatta Wheeler, 1915
  - Cephalotes Latreille, 1802
  - Chimaeridris Wilson, 1989
  - Colobostruma Wheeler, 1927
  - Cyatta Sosa-Calvo et al., 2013
  - Cyphomyrmex Mayr, 1862
  - Daceton Perty, 1833
  - Diaphoromyrma Fernández, Delabie & Nascimento, 2009
  - Epopostruma Forel, 1895
  - Eurhopalothrix Brown & Kempf, 1961
  - Ishakidris Bolton, 1984
  - Kalathomyrmex Klingenberg & Brandão, 2009
  - Lachnomyrmex Wheeler, 1910
  - Lenomyrmex Fernández & Palacio, 1999
  - Mesostruma Brown, 1948
  - Microdaceton Santschi, 1913
  - Mycetagroicus Brandão & Mayhé-Nunes, 2001
  - Mycetarotes Emery, 1913
  - Mycetophylax Emery, 1913
  - Mycetosoritis Wheeler, 1907
  - Mycocepurus Forel, 1893
  - Myrmicocrypta Smith, 1860
  - Ochetomyrmex Mayr, 1878
  - Octostruma Forel, 1912
  - Orectognathus Smith, 1853
  - Paramycetophylax Kusnezov, 1956
  - Phalacromyrmex Kempf, 1960
  - Pheidole Westwood, 1839
  - Pilotrochus Brown, 1978
  - Procryptocerus Emery, 1887
  - Protalaridris Brown, 1980
  - Pseudoatta Gallardo, 1916
  - Rhopalothrix Mayr, 1870
  - Sericomyrmex Mayr, 1865
  - Strumigenys Smith, 1860
  - Talaridris Weber, 1941
  - Trachymyrmex Forel, 1893
  - Tranopelta Mayr, 1866
- Crematogastrini Forel, 1893
  - Acanthomyrmex Emery, 1893
  - Adlerzia Forel, 1902
  - Ancyridris Wheeler, 1935
  - Aretidris General, 2015
  - Atopomyrmex André, 1889
  - Calyptomyrmex Emery, 1887
  - Cardiocondyla Emery, 1869
  - Carebara Westwood, 1840
  - Cataulacus Smith, 1853
  - Crematogaster Lund, 1831
  - Cyphoidris Weber, 1952
  - Dacatria Rigato, 1994
  - Dacetinops Brown & Wilson, 1957
  - Dicroaspis Emery, 1908
  - Dilobocondyla Santschi, 1910
  - Diplomorium Mayr, 1901
  - †Enneamerus Mayr, 1868
  - †Eocenomyrma Dlussky & Radchenko, 2006
  - Eutetramorium Emery, 1899
  - Formicoxenus Mayr, 1855
  - Formosimyrma Terayama, 2009
  - Gauromyrmex Menozzi, 1933
  - Gaoligongidris Xu, 2012
  - Harpagoxenus Forel, 1893
  - Huberia Forel, 1890
  - †Hypopomyrmex Emery, 1891
  - Indomyrma Brown, 1986
  - Kartidris Bolton, 1991
  - Lasiomyrma Terayama & Yamane, 2000
  - Leptothorax Mayr, 1855
  - Liomyrmex Mayr, 1865
  - †Lonchomyrmex Mayr, 1867
  - Lophomyrmex Emery, 1892
  - Lordomyrma Emery, 1897
  - Malagidris Bolton & Fisher, 2014
  - Mayriella Forel, 1902
  - Melissotarsus Emery, 1877
  - Meranoplus Smith, 1853
  - Metapone Forel, 1911
  - Myrmecina Curtis, 1829
  - Nesomyrmex Wheeler, 1910
  - Ocymyrmex Emery, 1886
  - †Oxyidris Wilson, 1985
  - †Parameranoplus Wheeler, 1915
  - Paratopula Wheeler, 1919
  - Perissomyrmex Smith, 1947
  - Peronomyrmex Viehmeyer, 1922
  - Podomyrma Smith, 1859
  - Poecilomyrma Mann, 1921
  - Pristomyrmex Mayr, 1866
  - Proatta Forel, 1912
  - Propodilobus Branstetter, 2009
  - Recurvidris Bolton, 1992
  - Rhopalomastix Forel, 1900
  - Romblonella Wheeler, 1935
  - Rostromyrmex Rosciszewski, 1994
  - Rotastruma Bolton, 1991
  - Royidris Bolton & Fisher, 2014
  - Secostruma Bolton, 1988
  - Stereomyrmex Emery, 1901
  - †Stigmomyrmex Mayr, 1868
  - †Stiphromyrmex Wheeler, 1915
  - Strongylognathus Mayr, 1853
  - Temnothorax Mayr, 1861
  - Terataner Emery, 1912
  - Tetheamyrma Bolton, 1991
  - Tetramorium Mayr, 1855
  - Trichomyrmex Mayr, 1865
  - Vitsika Bolton & Fisher, 2014
  - Vollenhovia Mayr, 1865
  - Vombisidris Bolton, 1991
  - Xenomyrmex Forel, 1885
- Myrmicini Lepeletier de Saint-Fargeau, 1835
  - Manica Jurine, 1807
  - Myrmica Latreille, 1804
  - †Plesiomyrmex Dlussky & Radchenko, 2009
  - †Protomyrmica Dlussky & Radchenko, 2009
- Pogonomyrmecini Ward, Brady, Fisher & Schultz, 2014
  - Hylomyrma Forel, 1912
  - Patagonomyrmex Johnson & Moreau, 2016
  - Pogonomyrmex Mayr, 1868
- Solenopsidini Forel, 1893
  - Adelomyrmex Emery, 1897
  - Anillomyrma Emery, 1913
  - Austromorium Shattuck, 2009
  - Baracidris Bolton, 1981
  - Bariamyrma Lattke, 1990
  - Bondroitia Forel, 1911
  - Cryptomyrmex Fernández, 2004
  - Dolopomyrmex Cover & Deyrup, 2007
  - Epelysidris Bolton, 1987
  - Kempfidris Fernández, Feitosa & Lattke, 2014
  - Megalomyrmex Forel, 1885
  - Monomorium Mayr, 1855
  - Myrmicaria Saunders, 1842
  - Oxyepoecus Santschi, 1926
  - Rogeria Emery, 1894
  - Solenopsis Westwood, 1840
  - Stegomyrmex Emery, 1912
  - Syllophopsis Santschi, 1915
  - Tropidomyrmex Silva, Feitosa, Brandão & Diniz, 2009
  - Tyrannomyrmex Fernández, 2003
- Stenammini Ashmead, 1905
  - Aphaenogaster Mayr, 1853
  - Goniomma Emery, 1895
  - Messor Forel, 1890
  - Novomessor Emery, 1915
  - Oxyopomyrmex André, 1881
  - †Paraphaenogaster Dlussky, 1981
  - Stenamma Westwood, 1839
  - Veromessor Forel, 1917
- incertae sedis
  - †Afromyrma Dlussky, Brothers & Rasnitsyn, 2004
  - †Agastomyrma Dlussky, Rasnitsyn & Perfilieva, 2015
  - †Bilobomyrma Radchenko & Dlussky, 2013
  - †Biamomyrma Dlussky, Rasnitsyn & Perfilieva, 2015
  - †Boltonidris Radchenko & Dlussky, 2012
  - †Brachytarsites Hong, 2002
  - †Cephalomyrmex Carpenter, 1930
  - †Clavipetiola Hong, 2002
  - †Electromyrmex Wheeler, 1910
  - †Eocenidris Wilson, 1985
  - †Eomyrmex Hong, 1974
  - †Fallomyrma Dlussky & Radchenko, 2006
  - †Fushunomyrmex Hong, 2002
  - †Ilemomyrmex Wilson, 1985
  - †Incertogaster Boudinot, 2024
  - †Lelejus Radchenko & Proshchalykin, 2021
  - †Miosolenopsis Zhang, 1989
  - †Myrmecites Dlussky & Rasnitsyn, 2003
  - †Orbigastrula Hong, 2002
  - †Quadrulicapito Hong, 2002
  - †Quineangulicapito Hong, 2002
  - †Sinomyrmex Hong, 2002
  - †Solenopsites Dlussky & Rasnitsyn, 2003
  - †Sphaerogasterites Hong, 2002
  - †Wumyrmex Hong, 2002
  - †Zhangidris Bolton, 2003
