= List of Strumigenys species =

This is a list of valid species of the myrmicine genus Strumigenys (miniature trap-jaw ants). There are more than 880 species are recorded for this genus.

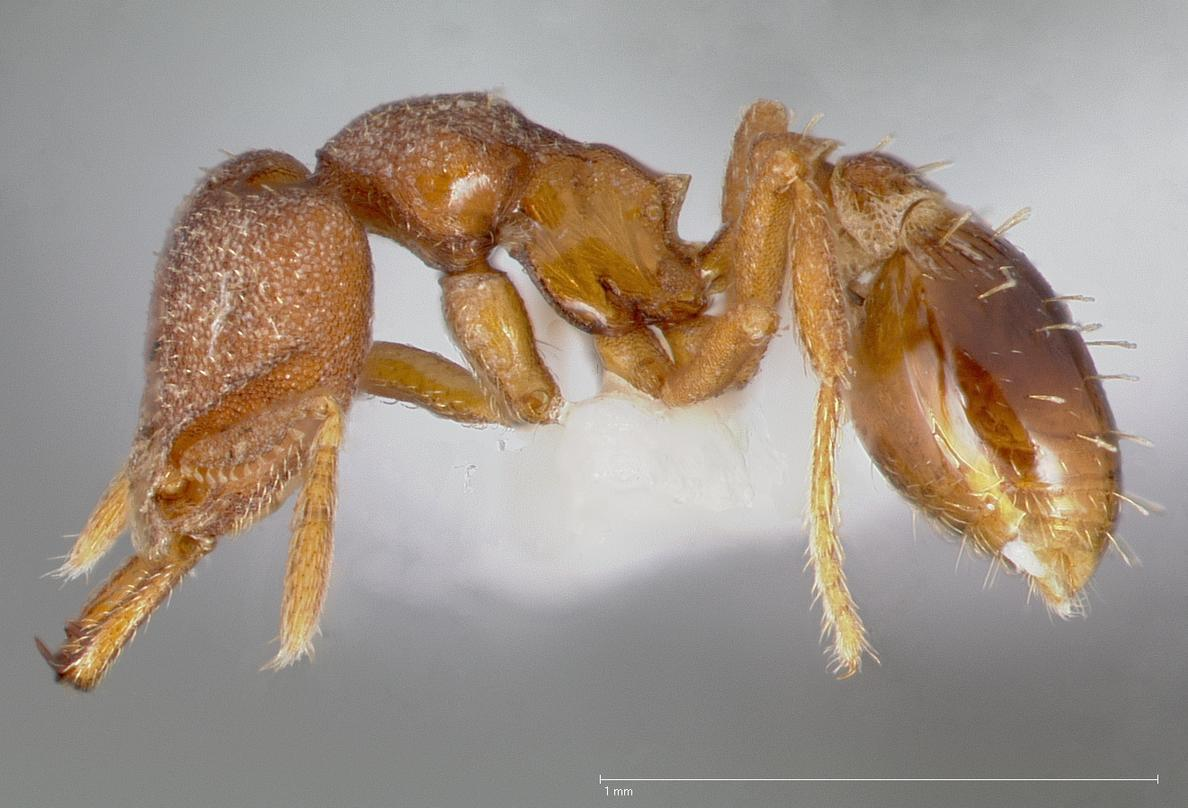
Strumigenys abdera

== A ==
- Strumigenys abdera Fisher, 2000
- Strumigenys abdita Wesson & Wesson, 1939
- Strumigenys abditivata (Bolton, 2000)
- Strumigenys acarai Sosa-Calvo et al., 2010
- Strumigenys acheron (Bolton, 2000)
- Strumigenys actis Fisher, 2000
- Strumigenys acubecca (Brown, 1972)
- Strumigenys adiastola Bolton, 2000
- Strumigenys admixta Fisher, 2000
- Strumigenys adrasora Bolton, 1983
- Strumigenys adsita Fisher, 2000
- Strumigenys aduncomala De Andrade, 2007
- Strumigenys aechme Bolton, 2000
- Strumigenys aello (Bolton, 2000)
- Strumigenys aenigma Bolton, 2000
- Strumigenys aequinoctialis De Andrade, 2007
- Strumigenys aethegenys (Bolton, 2000)
- Strumigenys africana (Bolton, 1983)
- Strumigenys agetos Fisher, 2000
- Strumigenys agnosta (Bolton, 2000)
- Strumigenys agostii (Bolton, 2000)
- Strumigenys agra Fisher, 2000
- Strumigenys ahares Bolton, 2000
- Strumigenys ailaoshana (Xu & Zhou, 2004)
- Strumigenys akalles Bolton, 2000
- Strumigenys akhtoi Bolton, 2000
- Strumigenys alapa Fisher, 2000
- Strumigenys alberti Forel, 1893
- Strumigenys alecto (Bolton, 2000)
- Strumigenys alessandrae Rigato, 2006
- Strumigenys alexetrix Bolton, 2000
- Strumigenys aline Silva et al., 2025
- Strumigenys alperti Fisher, 2000
- Strumigenys amasara Bolton, 2000
- Strumigenys ambatrix (Bolton, 2000)
- Strumigenys amnesia Bolton, 2000
- Strumigenys ampyx Fisher, 2000
- Strumigenys ananeotes Longino & Booher, 2019
- Strumigenys anarta (Bolton, 1983)
- Strumigenys anchiplex Bolton, 2000
- Strumigenys anchis Bolton, 2000
- Strumigenys anderseni (Bolton, 2000)
- Strumigenys anetes Brown, 1988
- Strumigenys angulata Smith, 1931
- Strumigenys anhdaoae Tang & Guénard, 2023
- Strumigenys anorak Sarnat et al., 2019
- Strumigenys anorbicula (Bolton, 2000)
- Strumigenys anthocera Lattke & Goitía, 1997
- Strumigenys apalachicolensis (Deyrup & Lubertazzi, 2001)
- Strumigenys apios Fisher, 2000
- Strumigenys appretiata (Borgmeier, 1954)
- Strumigenys arahana (Bolton, 1983)
- Strumigenys archboldi (Deyrup & Cover, 1998)
- Strumigenys arges (Bolton, 2000)
- Strumigenys argiola (Emery, 1869)
- Strumigenys arizonica (Ward, 1988)
- Strumigenys arnoldi Forel, 1913
- Strumigenys arrogantia Bolton, 2000
- Strumigenys artemis Sarnat et al., 2019
- Strumigenys asaphes (Bolton, 2000)
- Strumigenys ascita Bolton, 2000
- Strumigenys asrochia Bolton, 2000
- Strumigenys assamensis De Andrade, 1994
- Strumigenys ataxia Bolton, 2000
- Strumigenys atopogenys (Bolton, 2000)
- Strumigenys atropos (Bolton, 2000)
- Strumigenys auctidens (Bolton, 2000)
- Strumigenys augustandrewi (Longino, 2006)
- Strumigenys avatar Sarnat et al., 2019
- Strumigenys ayersthey Booher & Hoenle, 2021
- Strumigenys azteca (Kempf, 1960)

== B ==
- Strumigenys baal Bolton, 2000
- Strumigenys babelina Bolton, 2000
- Strumigenys baladria Bolton, 2000
- Strumigenys balux Fisher, 2000
- Strumigenys bartolozzii Rigato, 2006
- Strumigenys barylonga Bolton, 2000
- Strumigenys basiliska Bolton, 2000
- Strumigenys bathron Fisher, 2000
- Strumigenys baudueri (Emery, 1875)
- Strumigenys beebei (Wheeler, 1915)
- Strumigenys behasyla (Bolton, 1983)
- Strumigenys belial (Bolton, 2000)
- Strumigenys bellatrix (Bolton, 2000)
- Strumigenys belua Bolton, 2000
- Strumigenys benten (Terayama et al., 1996)
- Strumigenys benulia Bolton, 2000
- Strumigenys bequaerti Santschi, 1923
- Strumigenys berkalial Bolton, 2000
- Strumigenys bernardi Brown, 1960
- Strumigenys bibiolona Fisher, 2000
- Strumigenys bibis Bolton, 2000
- Strumigenys bimarginata Wesson & Wesson, 1939
- Strumigenys biolleyi Forel, 1908
- Strumigenys biroi Emery, 1897
- Strumigenys bitheria Bolton, 1983
- Strumigenys blanda Bolton, 2000
- Strumigenys bola Fisher, 2000
- Strumigenys boltoni (Deyrup, 2006)
- Strumigenys boneti Brown, 1959
- Strumigenys borgmeieri Brown, 1954
- Strumigenys brevicornis Mann, 1922
- Strumigenys brevisetosa Smith, 1935
- Strumigenys brontes (Bolton, 2000)
- Strumigenys browni (Bolton, 2000)
- Strumigenys bryanti Wheeler, 1919
- Strumigenys bubisnoda (Bolton, 2000)
- Strumigenys buddhista De Andrade, 2007
- Strumigenys buleru Brown, 1988
- Strumigenys bunki (Brown, 1950)

== C ==
- Strumigenys cabira Fisher, 2000
- Strumigenys cacaoensis Bolton, 1971
- Strumigenys caiman Booher et al., 2019
- Strumigenys calamita Bolton, 2000
- Strumigenys californica (Brown, 1950)
- Strumigenys calvus Dong & Kim, 2020
- Strumigenys canina (Brown & Boisvert, 1979)
- Strumigenys caniophanes Bolton, 2000
- Strumigenys caniophanoides De Andrade, 2007
- Strumigenys capitata (Smith, 1865)
- Strumigenys carinithorax Borgmeier, 1934
- Strumigenys carinognatha (Bolton, 2000)
- Strumigenys carisa Fisher, 2000
- Strumigenys carnassa (Bolton, 2000)
- Strumigenys carol Silva et al., 2025
- Strumigenys carolinae Fisher, 2000
- Strumigenys carolinensis (Brown, 1964)
- Strumigenys cascanteae (Longino, 2006)
- Strumigenys cassicuspis (Bolton, 2000)
- Strumigenys castanea (Brown, 1953)
- Strumigenys cavinasis (Brown, 1950)
- Strumigenys cenagra Bolton, 2000
- Strumigenys chapmani Brown, 1954
- Strumigenys chareta Bolton, 2000
- Strumigenys charino Fisher, 2000
- Strumigenys charybdis (Bolton, 2000)
- Strumigenys chernovi Dlussky, 1993
- Strumigenys chilo Fisher, 2000
- Strumigenys chimaera Bolton, 2000
- Strumigenys chiricahua (Ward, 1988)
- Strumigenys choii Lyu, 2007
- Strumigenys chorosa Bolton, 2000
- Strumigenys chroa Fisher, 2000
- Strumigenys chuchihensis Lin & Wu, 2001
- Strumigenys chyatha (Bolton, 1983)
- Strumigenys chyzeri Emery, 1897
- Strumigenys cincinnata (Kempf, 1975)
- Strumigenys cingatrix Bolton, 2000
- Strumigenys circothrix (Ogata & Onoyama, 1998)
- Strumigenys clasmospongia Brown, 1953
- Strumigenys claviseta Tang & Guénard, 2023
- Strumigenys clotho (Bolton, 2000)
- Strumigenys cloydi (Pfitzer, 1951)
- Strumigenys clypeata Roger, 1863
- Strumigenys cochlearis Brown, 1988
- Strumigenys collinsae Booher, 2021
- Strumigenys comis (Kempf, 1959)
- Strumigenys concolor Santschi, 1914
- Strumigenys confusatrix Bolton, 2000
- Strumigenys connectens Kempf, 1958
- Strumigenys consanii Brown, 1954
- Strumigenys conspersa Emery, 1906
- Strumigenys conturba Bolton, 2000
- Strumigenys convexiceps Santschi, 1931
- Strumigenys cordovensis Mayr, 1887
- Strumigenys cosmostela Kempf, 1975
- Strumigenys coveri Fisher, 2000
- Strumigenys covina Fisher, 2000
- Strumigenys crassicornis Mayr, 1887
- Strumigenys creightoni Smith, 1931
- Strumigenys crementa (Bolton, 2000)
- Strumigenys crinigera Tang & Guénard, 2023
- Strumigenys cryptura (Bolton, 1983)
- Strumigenys cultrigera Mayr, 1887
- Strumigenys cygarix Bolton, 2000

== D ==
- Strumigenys dagon (Bolton, 1983)
- Strumigenys dahlanae (Sosa-Calvo et al., 2010)
- Strumigenys daithma Bolton, 2000
- Strumigenys dantalion Bolton, 2000
- Strumigenys dapsilis (Bolton, 2000)
- Strumigenys daspleta (Bolton, 2000)
- Strumigenys datissa (Bolton, 1983)
- Strumigenys datryx Bolton, 2000
- Strumigenys dayui (Xu, 2000)
- Strumigenys decipula (Bolton, 2000)
- Strumigenys decollata Mann, 1919
- Strumigenys decumbens Tang & Guénard, 2023
- Strumigenys degonya Bolton, 2000
- Strumigenys deinognatha (Bolton, 2000)
- Strumigenys deinomastax (Bolton, 2000)
- Strumigenys deletrix Bolton, 2000
- Strumigenys delicata Tang & Guénard, 2023
- Strumigenys deltisquama Brown, 1957
- Strumigenys densissima Tang & Guénard, 2023
- Strumigenys denticulata Mayr, 1887
- Strumigenys dentinasis (Kempf, 1960)
- Strumigenys dentiscapa (Bolton, 2000)
- Strumigenys depilosa (Bolton, 2000)
- Strumigenys depressiceps Weber, 1934
- Strumigenys deuteras Bolton, 2000
- Strumigenys deverra Fisher, 2000
- Strumigenys dexis Fisher, 2000
- Strumigenys dextra Brown, 1954
- Strumigenys diabola Bolton, 2000
- Strumigenys diaptyxis Bolton, 2000
- Strumigenys diasphax Bolton, 2000
- Strumigenys dicomas Fisher, 2000
- Strumigenys dictynna (Bolton, 2000)
- Strumigenys didyma Bolton, 2000
- Strumigenys dietrichi Smith, 1931
- Strumigenys diota Fisher, 2000
- Strumigenys dipsas Bolton, 2000
- Strumigenys disarmata Brown, 1971
- Strumigenys disjuncta (Bolton, 2000)
- Strumigenys dispalata (Bolton, 2000)
- Strumigenys disturba Bolton, 2000
- Strumigenys diux Fisher, 2000
- Strumigenys dohertyi Emery, 1897
- Strumigenys dolabra Fisher, 2000
- Strumigenys dolichognatha Weber, 1934
- Strumigenys domitia Bolton, 2000
- Strumigenys dontopagis (Bolton, 2000)
- Strumigenys dora Fisher, 2000
- Strumigenys doriae Emery, 1887
- Strumigenys doryceps (Bolton, 2000)
- Strumigenys dotaja (Bolton, 1983)
- Strumigenys doxa Fisher, 2000
- Strumigenys doydeei Tang & Guénard, 2023
- Strumigenys dromica Bolton, 2000
- Strumigenys dromoshaula Bolton, 1983
- Strumigenys dryas Bolton, 2000
- Strumigenys dubitata Bolton, 2000
- Strumigenys dyak Brown, 1959
- Strumigenys dysanetes Bolton, 2000
- Strumigenys dyschima (Bolton, 2000)
- Strumigenys dyseides Bolton, 2000
- Strumigenys dyshaula Bolton, 1983

== E ==
- Strumigenys ebbae Forel, 1905
- Strumigenys ecliptacoca Brown, 1958
- Strumigenys economoi Booher et al., 2019
- Strumigenys ection Fisher, 2000
- Strumigenys edaragona Bolton, 2000
- Strumigenys eggersi Emery, 1890
- Strumigenys eidechthes Bolton, 2000
- Strumigenys ekasura Bolton, 2000
- Strumigenys elapoma Bolton, 2000
- Strumigenys elegantula (Terayama & Kubota, 1989)
- Strumigenys elongata Roger, 1863
- Strumigenys emarginata Mayr, 1901
- Strumigenys emdeni Forel, 1915
- Strumigenys emeryi Mann, 1922
- Strumigenys emeswangi (Bolton, 2000)
- Strumigenys emiliae Forel, 1907
- Strumigenys emmae (Emery, 1890)
- Strumigenys enanna Bolton, 2000
- Strumigenys enkara (Bolton, 1983)
- Strumigenys enopla (Bolton, 2000)
- Strumigenys epelys Bolton, 2000
- Strumigenys epinotalis Weber, 1934
- Strumigenys epipola (Bolton, 2000)
- Strumigenys epulo Fisher, 2000
- Strumigenys epyna Bolton, 2000
- Strumigenys erikae (Longino, 2006)
- Strumigenys erynnes (Bolton, 2000)
- Strumigenys esrossi Brown, 1957
- Strumigenys ettillax Bolton, 1983
- Strumigenys eumekes Bolton, 2000
- Strumigenys europs Fisher, 2000
- Strumigenys euryale (Bolton, 2000)
- Strumigenys eurycera (Emery, 1897)
- Strumigenys eversa Bolton, 2000
- Strumigenys excisa (Weber, 1934)
- Strumigenys exiguaevitae Baroni Urbani, 2007
- Strumigenys exilirhina Bolton, 2000
- Strumigenys extemena (Taylor, 1968)
- Strumigenys extirpa Bolton, 2000
- Strumigenys exunca (Bolton, 2000)

== F ==
- Strumigenys fairchildi Brown, 1961
- Strumigenys fanano Fisher, 2000
- Strumigenys faurei Arnold, 1948
- Strumigenys fautrix (Bolton, 2000)
- Strumigenys feae Emery, 1895
- Strumigenys fellowesi Tang & Guénard, 2023
- Strumigenys fenkara (Bolton, 1983)
- Strumigenys ferocior Brown, 1973
- Strumigenys festigona Bolton, 2000
- Strumigenys filirrhina (Brown, 1950)
- Strumigenys filitalpa (Brown, 1950)
- Strumigenys finator Fisher, 2000
- Strumigenys fisheri (Bolton, 2000)
- Strumigenys fixata Bolton, 2000
- Strumigenys flagellata (Taylor, 1962)
- Strumigenys flavianae Chaul, 2023
- Strumigenys forficata Brown, 1959
- Strumigenys formicosa Bolton, 2000
- Strumigenys formosa (Terayama et al., 1995)
- Strumigenys formosimonticola (Terayama et al., 1996)
- Strumigenys fricta Bolton, 2000
- Strumigenys fridericimuelleri Forel, 1886
- Strumigenys friedae Forel, 1915
- Strumigenys frivaldszkyi Emery, 1897
- Strumigenys frivola Bolton, 2000
- Strumigenys fronto Fisher, 2000
- Strumigenys fuarda Bolton, 2000
- Strumigenys fulda (Bolton, 1983)
- Strumigenys furfara Bolton, 2000
- Strumigenys furtiva (Bolton, 2000)

== G ==
- Strumigenys gabarys Bolton, 2000
- Strumigenys gamegyn Bolton, 2000
- Strumigenys gatuda (Bolton, 1983)
- Strumigenys gemella Kempf, 1975
- Strumigenys geminata Bolton, 2000
- Strumigenys geoterra (Bolton, 1983)
- Strumigenys geryon Bolton, 2000
- Strumigenys glenognatha (Bolton, 2000)
- Strumigenys gloriosa Bolton, 2000
- Strumigenys glycon Fisher, 2000
- Strumigenys gnathosphax Bolton, 2000
- Strumigenys godeffroyi Mayr, 1866
- Strumigenys godmani Forel, 1899
- Strumigenys gorgon Fisher, 2000
- Strumigenys grandidieri Forel, 1892
- Strumigenys gryphon Bolton, 2000
- Strumigenys grytava (Bolton, 2000)
- Strumigenys gundlachi (Roger, 1862)
- Strumigenys gunter Sarnat et al., 2019
- Strumigenys guttulata Forel, 1902
- Strumigenys gyges (Bolton, 2000)
- Strumigenys gyrogenys Bolton, 2000
- Strumigenys gytha Bolton, 2000

== H ==
- Strumigenys habropilosa Bolton, 2000
- Strumigenys hadrodens (Bolton, 2000)
- Strumigenys halosis (Bolton, 2000)
- Strumigenys halpas Bolton, 2000
- Strumigenys harpyia Bolton, 2000
- Strumigenys hastur Bolton, 2000
- Strumigenys hastyla Bolton, 1983
- Strumigenys hathor (Bolton, 2000)
- Strumigenys havilandi Forel, 1905
- Strumigenys hekate Bolton, 2000
- Strumigenys heliani Fisher, 2000
- Strumigenys helytruga Bolton, 1983
- Strumigenys hemichlaena Brown, 1971
- Strumigenys hemidisca Brown, 1953
- Strumigenys hemisobek (Bolton, 2000)
- Strumigenys hensekta (Bolton, 1983)
- Strumigenys heterodonta (Rigato & Scupola, 2008)
- Strumigenys heteropha Bolton, 2000
- Strumigenys hexamera (Brown, 1958)
- Strumigenys hilaris Fisher, 2000
- Strumigenys hindenburgi Forel, 1915
- Strumigenys hindu De Andrade, 2007
- Strumigenys hirashimai (Ogata, 1990)
- Strumigenys hiroshimensis (Ogata & Onoyama, 1998)
- Strumigenys hirsuta Tang et al., 2019
- Strumigenys hispida Lin & Wu, 1996
- Strumigenys hoplites Brown, 1973
- Strumigenys horvathi Emery, 1897
- Strumigenys hostilis Bolton, 2000
- Strumigenys hubbewatyorum Booher et al., 2019
- Strumigenys humata Lattke & Goitía, 1997
- Strumigenys hyalina (Bolton, 2000)
- Strumigenys hyletha Bolton, 2000
- Strumigenys hyphata (Brown, 1953)
- Strumigenys hypoturba Bolton, 2000

== I ==
- Strumigenys idiogenes Bolton, 2000
- Strumigenys ignota Bolton, 2000
- Strumigenys imantodes Bolton, 2000
- Strumigenys impidora (Bolton, 1983)
- Strumigenys inatos Fisher, 2000
- Strumigenys incerta (Brown, 1949)
- Strumigenys incomposita Bolton, 2000
- Strumigenys incuba Bolton, 2000
- Strumigenys indagatrix Wheeler, 1919
- Strumigenys infidelis Santschi, 1919
- Strumigenys inhonesta Bolton, 2000
- Strumigenys inopina (Deyrup & Cover, 1998)
- Strumigenys inopinata (Baroni Urbani & De Andrade, 1994)
- Strumigenys inquilina (Bolton, 1983)
- Strumigenys insolita Bolton, 2000
- Strumigenys insula (Bolton, 2000)
- Strumigenys integra Bolton, 2000
- Strumigenys interfectiva Lattke & Goitía, 1997
- Strumigenys inusitata (Lattke, 1992)
- Strumigenys ipsea Fisher, 2000
- Strumigenys irrorata Santschi, 1913
- Strumigenys itannae dos Santos-Neto et al., 2024
- Strumigenys izepara Bolton, 2000

== J ==
- Strumigenys jacobsoni Menozzi, 1939
- Strumigenys jaitrongi Tang & Guénard, 2023
- Strumigenys jamaicensis Brown, 1959
- Strumigenys japonica Ito, 1914
- Strumigenys jaqueline Silva et al., 2025
- Strumigenys jepsoni Mann, 1921
- Strumigenys jiangxiensis Zhou & Xu, 2003
- Strumigenys jugis Bolton, 2000
- Strumigenys juliae Forel, 1905
- Strumigenys juxta Bolton, 2000

== K ==
- Strumigenys kakothema Bolton, 2000
- Strumigenys kapryx Bolton, 2000
- Strumigenys karawajewi Brown, 1948
- Strumigenys katapelta Bolton, 1983
- Strumigenys kempfi (Taylor & Brown, 1978)
- Strumigenys kerasma (Bolton, 1983)
- Strumigenys khakaura (Bolton, 2000)
- Strumigenys kichijo (Terayama et al., 1996)
- Strumigenys kinomurai Terayama, 2020
- Strumigenys kompsomala (Bolton, 2000)
- Strumigenys koningsbergeri Forel, 1905
- Strumigenys konteiensis Lin & Wu, 2001
- Strumigenys korahyla Bolton, 1983
- Strumigenys kraepelini Forel, 1905
- Strumigenys kumadori Yoshimura & Onoyama, 2007
- Strumigenys kyidriformis (Brown, 1964)
- Strumigenys kyroma Bolton, 2000

== L ==
- Strumigenys labaris Fisher, 2000
- Strumigenys lacacoca Brown, 1959
- Strumigenys lachesis (Bolton, 2000)
- Strumigenys lacunosa Lin & Wu, 1996
- Strumigenys laevinasis Smith, 1931
- Strumigenys laevipleura Kempf, 1958
- Strumigenys lalassa (Bolton, 2000)
- Strumigenys lamia Bolton, 2000
- Strumigenys lancea Bolton, 2000
- Strumigenys langrandi Fisher, 2000
- Strumigenys lantaui Tang et al., 2019
- Strumigenys lanuginosa Wheeler, 1905
- Strumigenys lasia (Brown, 1976)
- Strumigenys laticeps (Brown, 1962)
- Strumigenys lebratyx Bolton, 2000
- Strumigenys leptodeira Bolton, 2000
- Strumigenys leptorhina Bolton, 2000
- Strumigenys leptothrix Wheeler, 1929
- Strumigenys levana Fisher, 2000
- Strumigenys lewisi Cameron, 1886
- Strumigenys lexex Fisher, 2000
- Strumigenys lichiaensis Lin & Wu, 1996
- Strumigenys ligur Bolton, 2000
- Strumigenys lilloana (Brown, 1950)
- Strumigenys liophila Bolton, 2000
- Strumigenys liui Hamer et al., 2025
- Strumigenys liukueiensis Terayama & Kubota, 1989
- Strumigenys liuweii Tang & Guénard, 2023
- Strumigenys livens Fisher, 2000
- Strumigenys londianensis (Patrizi, 1946)
- Strumigenys longidens Tang & Guénard, 2023
- Strumigenys longimala De Andrade, 2007
- Strumigenys longinoi (Bolton, 2000)
- Strumigenys longispinosa Brown, 1958
- Strumigenys lopotyle Brown, 1969
- Strumigenys loriae Emery, 1897
- Strumigenys loricata Bolton, 2000
- Strumigenys louisianae Roger, 1863
- Strumigenys loveridgei (Brown, 1953)
- Strumigenys luca Fisher, 2000
- Strumigenys lucifuga (Bolton, 2000)
- Strumigenys lucky Booher, 2021
- Strumigenys lucomo Fisher, 2000
- Strumigenys ludia Mann, 1922
- Strumigenys ludovici Forel, 1904
- Strumigenys lujae Forel, 1902
- Strumigenys lura Fisher, 2000
- Strumigenys lutron Fisher, 2000
- Strumigenys lycosa Bolton, 2000
- Strumigenys lygatrix (Bolton, 2000)
- Strumigenys lyroessa (Roger, 1862)
- Strumigenys lysis Fisher, 2000

== M ==
- Strumigenys macerina Bolton, 2000
- Strumigenys macgowni Booher, 2021
- Strumigenys madrigalae Lattke & Aguirre, 2015
- Strumigenys magnifica Bolton, 2000
- Strumigenys mailei Wilson & Taylor, 1967
- Strumigenys malaplax (Bolton, 1983)
- Strumigenys mandibularis Smith, 1860
- Strumigenys manga Fisher, 2000
- Strumigenys manis Bolton, 2000
- Strumigenys marchosias (Bolton, 2000)
- Strumigenys margaritae Forel, 1893
- Strumigenys marginata (Santschi, 1914)
- Strumigenys marginiventris Santschi, 1931
- Strumigenys mariae (Sosa-Calvo et al., 2010)
- Strumigenys marleyi Arnold, 1914
- Strumigenys marmorata Hamer et al., 2025
- Strumigenys masukoi (Ogata & Onoyama, 1998)
- Strumigenys maxillaris Baroni Urbani, 2007
- Strumigenys maynei Forel, 1916
- Strumigenys mayri Emery, 1897
- Strumigenys mazu (Terayama et al., 1996)
- Strumigenys mboehara Silva et al., 2025
- Strumigenys media (Wilson & Brown, 1956)
- Strumigenys mediocris Tang & Guénard, 2023
- Strumigenys medusa (Bolton, 2000)
- Strumigenys megaera (Bolton, 2000)
- Strumigenys mekaha (Bolton, 1983)
- Strumigenys membranifera Emery, 1869
- Strumigenys memorialis (Deyrup, 1998)
- Strumigenys mendezi Booher, 2021
- Strumigenys menueta Bolton, 2000
- Strumigenys mesahyla Bolton, 1983
- Strumigenys mesedsura Bolton, 2000
- Strumigenys metazytes (Bolton, 2000)
- Strumigenys metopia (Brown, 1959)
- Strumigenys metrix (Bolton, 2000)
- Strumigenys miccata (Bolton, 1983)
- Strumigenys micrans Fisher, 2000
- Strumigenys micretes Brown, 1959
- Strumigenys microthrix (Kempf, 1975)
- Strumigenys micrura Bolton, 2000
- Strumigenys milae Fisher, 2000
- Strumigenys minax Bolton, 2000
- Strumigenys mineira Jacintho & Chaul, 2026
- Strumigenys minima (Bolton, 1972)
- Strumigenys miniteras Bolton, 2000
- Strumigenys minkara (Bolton, 1983)
- Strumigenys minuscula (Kempf, 1962)
- Strumigenys minutula Terayama & Kubota, 1989
- Strumigenys mionova Bolton, 2000
- Strumigenys mira (Bolton, 2000)
- Strumigenys mirabilis Mann, 1926
- Strumigenys mirifica Bolton, 2000
- Strumigenys missina Bolton, 2000
- Strumigenys missouriensis Smith, 1931
- Strumigenys mitis (Brown, 2000)
- Strumigenys mixta Brown, 1953
- Strumigenys mjoebergi Brown, 1959
- Strumigenys mnemosyne (Bolton, 2000)
- Strumigenys mocsaryi Emery, 1897
- Strumigenys mododonta Bolton, 2000
- Strumigenys moera Bolton, 2000
- Strumigenys mola Fisher, 2000
- Strumigenys moloch (Bolton, 2000)
- Strumigenys monoropa Bolton, 2000
- Strumigenys monstra Bolton, 2000
- Strumigenys montu Bolton, 2000
- Strumigenys moreauviae Booher, 2021
- Strumigenys morisitai (Ogata & Onoyama, 1998)
- Strumigenys mormo (Bolton, 2000)
- Strumigenys morphica Bolton, 2000
- Strumigenys mukkaliensis Bharti & Akbar, 2013
- Strumigenys mumfordi Wheeler, 1932
- Strumigenys murphyi (Taylor, 1968)
- Strumigenys murshila Bolton, 1983
- Strumigenys mutica (Brown, 1949)
- Strumigenys myllorhapha (Brown, 1959)

== N ==
- Strumigenys naberia Bolton, 2000
- Strumigenys nageli Baroni Urbani & De Andrade, 2007
- Strumigenys nambao Fisher, 2000
- Strumigenys nankunshana (Zhou, 2011)
- Strumigenys nannosobek (Bolton, 2000)
- Strumigenys nanzanensis Lin & Wu, 1996
- Strumigenys nastata Bolton, 2000
- Strumigenys nathistorisoc Tang et al., 2019
- Strumigenys natynion Bolton, 2000
- Strumigenys necopina (Bolton, 2000)
- Strumigenys nepalensis De Andrade, 1994
- Strumigenys nergala Bolton, 2000
- Strumigenys nesteryx Bolton, 2000
- Strumigenys nevermanni Brown, 1959
- Strumigenys nidifex Mann, 1921
- Strumigenys nigra Brown, 1971
- Strumigenys nigrescens Wheeler, 1911
- Strumigenys nimbrata Bolton, 1983
- Strumigenys nimravida (Bolton, 2000)
- Strumigenys ninda (Bolton, 1983)
- Strumigenys nitens Santschi, 1932
- Strumigenys noara (Bolton, 2000)
- Strumigenys nongba (Xu & Zhou, 2004)
- Strumigenys norax Fisher, 2000
- Strumigenys nothomopyx Bolton, 2000
- Strumigenys nubila Lattke & Goitía, 1997
- Strumigenys nummula Bolton, 2000
- Strumigenys nykara (Bolton, 1983)
- Strumigenys nysu Bolton, 2000
- Strumigenys nytaxis Bolton, 2000

== O ==
- Strumigenys oasis Sarnat et al., 2019
- Strumigenys obliqua Bolton, 2000
- Strumigenys ochosa Bolton, 2000
- Strumigenys oconitrilloae (Longino, 2006)
- Strumigenys ocypete (Bolton, 2000)
- Strumigenys odacon Fisher, 2000
- Strumigenys odalatra Bolton, 2000
- Strumigenys offina Bolton, 2000
- Strumigenys ogloblini Santschi, 1936
- Strumigenys ogyga (Bolton, 2000)
- Strumigenys olsoni (Bolton, 2000)
- Strumigenys omalyx Bolton, 1983
- Strumigenys omopyx Bolton, 2000
- Strumigenys onorei Baroni Urbani & De Andrade, 2007
- Strumigenys opaca Brown, 1954
- Strumigenys orchibia (Brown, 1953)
- Strumigenys orchidensis Lin & Wu, 2001
- Strumigenys origo Fisher, 2000
- Strumigenys ornata Mayr, 1887
- Strumigenys orthanetes Bolton, 2000
- Strumigenys ortholex Bolton, 2000
- Strumigenys osellai (Rigato & Scupola, 2008)
- Strumigenys oxysma (Bolton, 1983)

== P ==
- Strumigenys pachycephala Bolton, 2000
- Strumigenys paimon Bolton, 2000
- Strumigenys pallentra Bolton, 2000
- Strumigenys pallestes Bolton, 1971
- Strumigenys paloma Silva et al., 2025
- Strumigenys panamensis (Sosa-Calvo et al., 2006)
- Strumigenys panaulax Bolton, 2000
- Strumigenys paniaguae (Longino, 2006)
- Strumigenys panopla Bolton, 2000
- Strumigenys paradoxa (Bolton, 2000)
- Strumigenys paranax Bolton, 1983
- Strumigenys paranetes Brown, 1988
- Strumigenys paraposta Bolton, 2000
- Strumigenys pariensis Lattke & Goitía, 1997
- Strumigenys parsauga (Bolton, 2000)
- Strumigenys parzival Sarnat et al., 2019
- Strumigenys pasisops (Bolton, 2000)
- Strumigenys pedunculata (Brown, 1953)
- Strumigenys peetersi (Bolton, 2000)
- Strumigenys peraucta Bolton, 2000
- Strumigenys percrypta Bolton, 2000
- Strumigenys perdita Bolton, 2000
- Strumigenys pergandei Emery, 1895
- Strumigenys perissognatha (Bolton, 2000)
- Strumigenys perparva Brown, 1958
- Strumigenys perplexa (Smith, 1876)
- Strumigenys perturba Bolton, 2000
- Strumigenys petiolata Bernard, 1953
- Strumigenys peyrierasi Fisher, 2000
- Strumigenys pharosa Bolton, 2000
- Strumigenys phasma (Bolton, 2000)
- Strumigenys philiporum Brown, 1988
- Strumigenys phoenix Bolton, 2000
- Strumigenys pholidota (Bolton, 2000)
- Strumigenys phytibia Brown, 1957
- Strumigenys pilinasis Forel, 1901
- Strumigenys piliversa (Bolton, 2000)
- Strumigenys pilosa Zhou, 2001
- Strumigenys placora (Bolton, 1983)
- Strumigenys planeti Brown, 1953
- Strumigenys platyscapa Bolton, 2000
- Strumigenys pliocera Bolton, 2000
- Strumigenys pnyxia Bolton, 2000
- Strumigenys podarge (Bolton, 2000)
- Strumigenys praecollata Bolton, 2000
- Strumigenys praefecta Bolton, 2000
- Strumigenys precava Brown, 1954
- Strumigenys pretoriae Arnold, 1949
- Strumigenys prex (Bolton, 2000)
- Strumigenys princeps Kempf & Brown, 1969
- Strumigenys probatrix (Brown, 1964)
- Strumigenys propinqua Bolton, 2000
- Strumigenys prosopis Bolton, 2000
- Strumigenys prospiciens Emery, 1906
- Strumigenys pulchella Emery, 1895
- Strumigenys pulchra Bolton, 2000
- Strumigenys pydrax (Bolton, 2000)

== Q ==
- Strumigenys quadrua Bolton, 2000
- Strumigenys quattuor Bolton, 2000
- Strumigenys quinquedentata Crawley, 1923

== R ==
- Strumigenys rabesoni Fisher, 2000
- Strumigenys racabura Bolton, 2000
- Strumigenys radix Bolton, 2000
- Strumigenys rakkota Bolton, 2000
- Strumigenys rallarhina Bolton, 2000
- Strumigenys rantan Bolton, 2000
- Strumigenys raptans (Bolton, 2000)
- Strumigenys ravidura (Bolton, 1983)
- Strumigenys ravola Fisher, 2000
- Strumigenys rayma Bolton, 2000
- Strumigenys rectidens Brown, 1966
- Strumigenys reflexa Wesson & Wesson, 1939
- Strumigenys rehi Forel, 1907
- Strumigenys relahyla Bolton, 1983
- Strumigenys reliquia (Ward, 1988)
- Strumigenys reticeps (Kempf, 1969)
- Strumigenys retothra Bolton, 2000
- Strumigenys rhadina Bolton, 2000
- Strumigenys rhea (Bolton, 2000)
- Strumigenys rimdahli Hamer et al., 2025
- Strumigenys robertsoni (Bolton, 2000)
- Strumigenys rofocala Bolton, 2000
- Strumigenys roganas Bolton, 2000
- Strumigenys rogata (Bolton, 2000)
- Strumigenys rogeri Emery, 1890
- Strumigenys rohweri Smith, 1935
- Strumigenys rongi Tang & Guénard, 2023
- Strumigenys roomi (Bolton, 1972)
- Strumigenys rostrata Emery, 1895
- Strumigenys rostrataeformis (Brown, 1949)
- Strumigenys rotogenys Bolton, 2000
- Strumigenys royi Sosa-Calvo et al., 2010
- Strumigenys rubigus Fisher, 2000
- Strumigenys rudinodis Stärcke, 1941
- Strumigenys rufobrunea Santschi, 1914
- Strumigenys rugithorax (Kempf, 1959)
- Strumigenys rukha Bolton, 1983
- Strumigenys runa (Bolton, 2000)
- Strumigenys rusta (Bolton, 1983)
- Strumigenys ruta Bolton, 2000

== S ==
- Strumigenys sahura (Bolton, 1983)
- Strumigenys saliens Mayr, 1887
- Strumigenys sanctipauli Kempf, 1958
- Strumigenys sardella Bolton, 2000
- Strumigenys sardonica (Bolton, 2000)
- Strumigenys sarissa Bolton, 1983
- Strumigenys sauteri (Forel, 1912)
- Strumigenys scelesta Mann, 1921
- †Strumigenys schleeorum Baroni Urbani, 1994
- Strumigenys schmalzi Emery, 1906
- Strumigenys schuetzi Fisher, 2000
- Strumigenys schulzi Emery, 1894
- Strumigenys scolopax (Bolton, 2000)
- Strumigenys scotti Forel, 1912
- Strumigenys scutica Tang & Guénard, 2023
- Strumigenys scylla (Bolton, 2000)
- Strumigenys segrex Bolton, 2000
- Strumigenys semicompta (Brown, 1959)
- Strumigenys semicrypta Bolton, 2000
- Strumigenys semirex Bolton, 2000
- Strumigenys separa Bolton, 2000
- Strumigenys serket (Bolton, 2000)
- Strumigenys serradens (Bolton, 2000)
- Strumigenys serraformis (Bolton, 2000)
- Strumigenys serrula Santschi, 1910
- Strumigenys seti (Bolton, 2000)
- Strumigenys sevesta Bolton, 2000
- Strumigenys seynoka Bolton, 2000
- Strumigenys sharra (Bolton, 1983)
- Strumigenys shattucki (Bolton, 2000)
- Strumigenys shaula Bolton, 1983
- Strumigenys siagodens (Bolton, 2000)
- Strumigenys sibyna Bolton, 2000
- Strumigenys signeae Forel, 1905
- Strumigenys silangan General & Alpert, 2025
- Strumigenys silvestrii Emery, 1906
- Strumigenys simoni Emery, 1895
- Strumigenys simulans (Santschi, 1931)
- Strumigenys sinensis (Wang, 2000)
- Strumigenys sistrura (Bolton, 1983)
- Strumigenys sisyrata Brown, 1968
- Strumigenys skia Bolton, 2000
- Strumigenys smilax Bolton, 2000
- Strumigenys smithii Forel, 1886
- Strumigenys smythiesii Forel, 1902
- Strumigenys snellingi Bolton, 2000
- Strumigenys solifontis Brown, 1949
- Strumigenys spathoda Bolton, 1983
- Strumigenys spathula Lattke & Goitía, 1997
- Strumigenys sphera Fisher, 2000
- Strumigenys splendens (Borgmeier, 1954)
- Strumigenys stauroma (Bolton, 2000)
- Strumigenys stemonixys Brown, 1971
- Strumigenys stenorhina Bolton, 2000
- Strumigenys stenotes (Bolton, 2000)
- Strumigenys stheno (Bolton, 2000)
- Strumigenys strenosa Bolton, 2000
- Strumigenys strigatella Bolton, 2000
- Strumigenys strummeri Tang & Guénard, 2023
- Strumigenys strygax Bolton, 2000
- Strumigenys stygia Santschi, 1913
- Strumigenys subedentata Mayr, 1887
- Strumigenys sublaminata Brown, 1959
- Strumigenys sublonga Brown, 1958
- Strumigenys sublucida (Brown, 1953)
- Strumigenys subnuda (MacGown & Hill, 2010)
- Strumigenys subsessa (Bolton, 2000)
- Strumigenys substricta (Kempf, 1964)
- Strumigenys subterranea Brassard et al., 2020
- Strumigenys subtilis Booher, 2021
- Strumigenys sulcata Bolton, 2000
- Strumigenys sulumana (Bolton, 1983)
- Strumigenys superba Bolton, 2000
- Strumigenys superstes Booher & Uhey, 2020
- Strumigenys sutrix Bolton, 2000
- Strumigenys sydorata Bolton, 2000
- Strumigenys sylvaini Fisher, 2000
- Strumigenys symmetrix (Bolton, 2000)
- Strumigenys synchysis Bolton, 2000
- Strumigenys synkara (Bolton, 1983)
- Strumigenys syntacta Bolton, 2000
- Strumigenys sytaria Bolton, 2000
- Strumigenys szalayi Emery, 1897

== T ==
- Strumigenys tachirensis Lattke & Goitía, 1997
- Strumigenys tacta (Bolton, 1983)
- Strumigenys tadynastes Bolton, 2000
- Strumigenys takasago (Terayama et al., 1995)
- Strumigenys talpa Weber, 1934
- Strumigenys tantilla Bolton, 2000
- Strumigenys tanymastax (Brown, 1964)
- Strumigenys taphra (Bolton, 2000)
- Strumigenys taraxis Bolton, 2000
- Strumigenys tarbosyne (Bolton, 2000)
- Strumigenys tathula (Bolton, 2000)
- Strumigenys tegar Fisher, 2000
- Strumigenys tenitecta Bolton, 2000
- Strumigenys tenuipilis Emery, 1915
- Strumigenys tenuissima (Brown, 1953)
- Strumigenys teratrix (Bolton, 2000)
- Strumigenys terayamai (Bolton, 2000)
- Strumigenys terroni (Bolton, 1983)
- Strumigenys tethepa (Bolton, 2000)
- Strumigenys tethys (Bolton, 2000)
- Strumigenys tetra Bolton, 2000
- Strumigenys tetragnatha (Taylor, 1966)
- Strumigenys tetraphanes Brown, 1954
- Strumigenys thanikkudyensis Bharti & Akbar, 2013
- Strumigenys thaxteri (Wheeler, 1916)
- Strumigenys theia (Bolton, 2000)
- Strumigenys themis (Bolton, 2000)
- Strumigenys thomae Kempf, 1976
- Strumigenys thuvida (Bolton, 1983)
- Strumigenys tiglath (Bolton, 1983)
- Strumigenys tigrilla (Brown, 1973)
- Strumigenys tigris Brown, 1971
- Strumigenys timicala Bolton, 2000
- Strumigenys tisiphone (Bolton, 2000)
- Strumigenys tisisyx Bolton, 2000
- Strumigenys tlaloc (Bolton, 2000)
- Strumigenys tococae Wheeler & Bequaert, 1929
- Strumigenys tolomyla (Bolton, 1983)
- Strumigenys toma Fisher, 2000
- Strumigenys tomodonta Bolton, 2000
- Strumigenys totyla Bolton, 1983
- Strumigenys trada Lin & Wu, 1996
- Strumigenys tragaordhi Santschi, 1913
- Strumigenys transenna Bolton, 2000
- Strumigenys transversa Santschi, 1913
- Strumigenys trauma (Bolton, 2000)
- Strumigenys treptodens Bolton, 2000
- Strumigenys trieces Brown, 1960
- Strumigenys trinidadensis Wheeler, 1922
- Strumigenys tritomea Bolton, 2000
- Strumigenys trixodens Bolton, 2000
- Strumigenys trudifera Kempf & Brown, 1969
- Strumigenys truncatidens (Brown, 1950)
- Strumigenys trymala (Bolton, 1983)
- Strumigenys tukulta (Bolton, 1983)
- Strumigenys tumida Bolton, 2000
- Strumigenys turpis (Bolton, 2000)

== U ==
- Strumigenys uberyx Bolton, 2000
- Strumigenys uichancoi Brown, 1957
- Strumigenys ulteria Bolton, 2000
- Strumigenys ultromalyx Bolton, 2000
- Strumigenys umboceps (Bolton, 2000)
- Strumigenys undras Bolton, 2000
- Strumigenys urrhobia (Bolton, 2000)
- Strumigenys usbensis Lattke & Goitía, 1997

== V ==
- Strumigenys valefor Bolton, 2000
- Strumigenys varanga Bolton, 2000
- Strumigenys vartana (Bolton, 2000)
- Strumigenys vassago Bolton, 2000
- Strumigenys vazerka Bolton, 1983
- Strumigenys vazimba Fisher, 2000
- Strumigenys veddha De Andrade, 2007
- Strumigenys vertigosa Bolton, 2000
- Strumigenys vescops (Bolton, 2000)
- Strumigenys victrix (Bolton, 2000)
- Strumigenys vilhenai Bolton, 2000
- Strumigenys villiersi (Perrault, 1986)
- Strumigenys vindala Bolton, 2000
- Strumigenys virgila Bolton, 2000
- Strumigenys vitoria Silva et al., 2025
- Strumigenys vivax Bolton, 2000
- Strumigenys vodensa (Bolton, 1983)

== W ==
- Strumigenys waiwai Sosa-Calvo et al., 2010
- Strumigenys wallacei Emery, 1897
- Strumigenys wardi Fisher, 2000
- Strumigenys warditeras (Bolton, 2000)
- Strumigenys weberi (Brown, 1959)
- Strumigenys wheeleriana Baroni Urbani, 2007
- Strumigenys wilsoni Brown, 1969
- Strumigenys wilsoniana Baroni Urbani, 2007
- Strumigenys wrayi (Brown, 1950)
- Strumigenys wylixa Fisher, 2025

== X ==
- Strumigenys xenochelyna (Bolton, 2000)
- Strumigenys xenognatha Kempf, 1958
- Strumigenys xenohyla Bolton, 1983
- Strumigenys xenomastax (Bolton, 2000)
- Strumigenys xenopilus Tang & Guénard, 2023
- Strumigenys xenos Brown, 1955
- Strumigenys xochipili Bolton, 2000
- Strumigenys xoko dos Santos-Neto et al., 2024

== Y ==
- Strumigenys yaleogyna (Wilson & Brown, 1956)
- Strumigenys yaleopleura Brown, 1988
- Strumigenys yamanei Tang & Guénard, 2023
- Strumigenys yangi (Xu & Zhou, 2004)
- Strumigenys yanintra Bolton, 2000
- Strumigenys yasumatsui Brown, 1971

== Z ==
- Strumigenys zagan Bolton, 2000
- Strumigenys zandala Bolton, 1983
- Strumigenys zanderi Tang & Guénard, 2023
- Strumigenys zapyx Bolton, 2000
- Strumigenys zemi Booher et al., 2019
- Strumigenys zeteki (Brown, 1959)
- Strumigenys zhenghuii Tang & Guénard, 2023
- Strumigenys zygon Bolton, 2000

== Extinct ==
- †Strumigenys electrina De Andrade, 1994
