= Cephaloxys =

Cephaloxys can refer to:

- Cephaloxys Smith, F., 1865, ant, synonym of Strumigenys
- Cephaloxys Desv., illegitimate superfluous name, plant, synonym of Juncus
