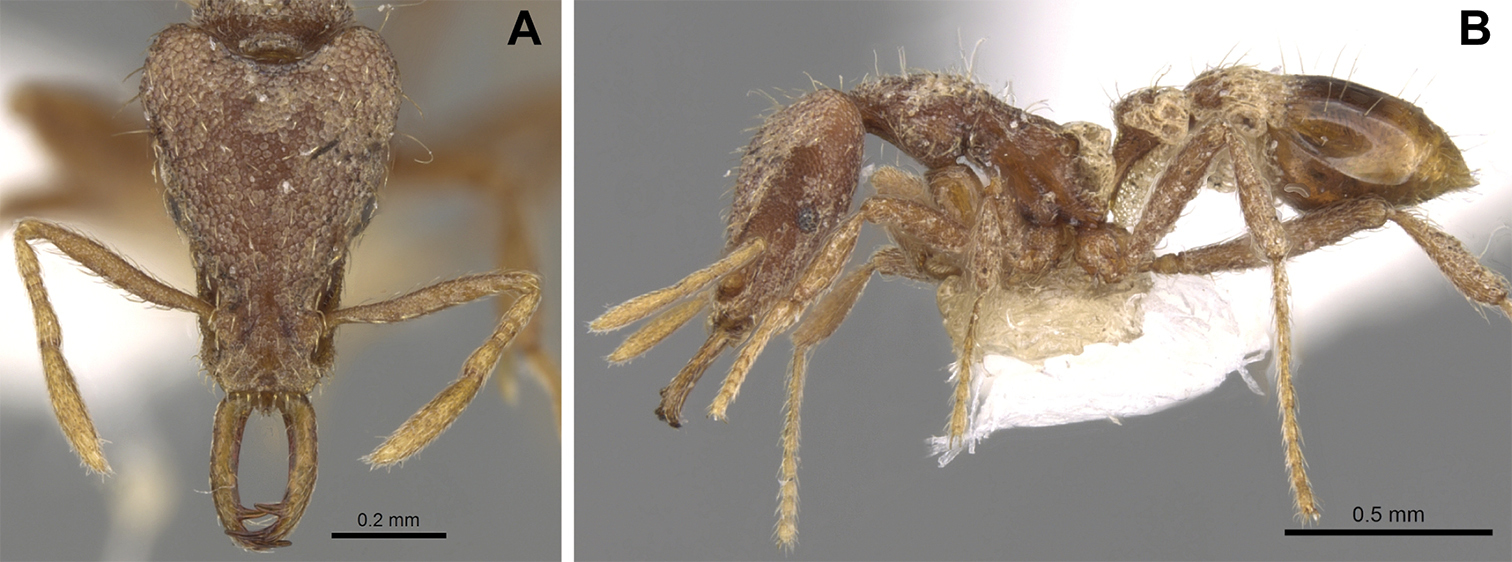

Scientific classification
- Kingdom: Animalia
- Phylum: Arthropoda
- Clade: Pancrustacea
- Class: Insecta
- Order: Hymenoptera
- Family: Formicidae
- Subfamily: Myrmicinae
- Genus: Strumigenys
- Species: S. nanzanensis

Binomial name
- Strumigenys nanzanensis Lin & Wu, 1996

= Strumigenys nanzanensis =

Species of ant

Strumigenys nanzanensis is a species of yellow ant endemic to Taiwan. This ant is similar to Strumigenys minutula but is hairier with straighter mandibular shafts.

== Taxonomy ==
Strumigenys nanzanensis was formally described in 1996 on the basis of a holotype specimen collected in Nanzanshan in Pingtung County, Taiwan. The species is named after its type locality.

== Description ==
Both worker and female Strumigenys nanzanensis have yellow bodies. They are small ants, with workers having total lengths ranging from 2.20–3.22 mm (0.087–0.13 in). Females grow to a length of 2.55–2.58 mm (0.10–0.10 in). This species is characterized by the front margin of the clypeus running transverse to the body (instead of having a deep concave notch), the eyes projecting past the dorsolateral margin of the head, a pair of elongate hairs projecting from the dorsal sides of the head, the presence of spine-like teeth just prior to the tip of the mandible, a fork at the tip of the mandible with an intercalary denticle nestled in between the spine-like teeth, spongiform teeth on the propodeum, and many elongate spoon-shaped hairs on the first gastral tergite. It can be further differentiated from S. chuchihensis by its small size, large eyes with 28 or 29 ommatidia, and the many short hairs on the upper surface of the promesonotum. Females of this species are distinguished by the strongly curved upper surface of the mesonoma (when viewed side-on).

This species is similar in appearance to Strumigenys minutula. Compared to S. minutula, S. nanzanensis workers have straighter mandibles and many more short, spoon-shaped hairs on the promesonotum. Females differ in having a more strongly curved upper surface of the mesonoma.

== Distribution ==
Strumigenys nanzanensis is a Taiwanese endemic, having only been recorded from Pingtung County.
