= List of organisms named after famous people =

In biological nomenclature, organisms often receive scientific names that honor a person. A taxon (e.g., species or genus; plural: taxa) named in honor of another entity is an eponymous taxon, and names specifically honoring a person or persons are known as patronyms. Scientific names are generally formally published in peer-reviewed journal articles or larger monographs along with descriptions of the named taxa and ways to distinguish them from other taxa. Following rules of Latin grammar, species or subspecies names derived from a man's name often end in -i or -ii if named for an individual, and -orum if named for a group of men or mixed-sex group, such as a family. Similarly, those named for a woman often end in -ae, or -arum for two or more women. There are exceptions such as Strumigenys ayersthey.

This list includes organisms named after famous individuals or ensembles (including bands and comedy troupes), but excludes companies, institutions, ethnic groups or nationalities, and populated places. It does not include organisms named for fictional entities (which can be found in the List of organisms named after works of fiction), for biologists or other natural scientists, (Note: Charles Darwin, for instance, has over 300 eponymous organisms.) nor for associates or family members of researchers who are not otherwise notable.

The scientific names are given as originally described (their basionyms): subsequent research may have placed species in different genera, or rendered them taxonomic synonyms of previously described taxa. Some of these names are unavailable in the zoological sense or illegitimate in the botanical sense due to senior homonyms already having the same name.

== Lists ==
- List of organisms named after famous people (born before 1800)
- List of organisms named after famous people (born 1800–1899)
- List of organisms named after famous people (born 1900–1924)
- List of organisms named after famous people (born 1925–1949)
- List of organisms named after famous people (born 1950–1974)
- List of organisms named after famous people (born 1975–present)

== See also ==
- List of bacterial genera named after people
- List of rose cultivars named after people
- List of taxa named by anagrams
- List of unusual biological names
- List of organisms named after works of fiction
