= Strumigenys moreauviae =

Scientific classification
- Kingdom: Animalia
- Phylum: Arthropoda
- Clade: Pancrustacea
- Class: Insecta
- Order: Hymenoptera
- Family: Formicidae
- Subfamily: Myrmicinae
- Genus: Strumigenys
- Species: S. moreauviae

Binomial name
- Strumigenys moreauviae Booher, 2021

Species of ant

Sturmigenys moreeauviae is a species of ant that is native to western North America (New Mexico and Colorado). S. moreauviae was named after myrmecologist Corrie S. Moreau because of her contributions in myrmecology and evolution biology. The collected specimen is a holotype worker ant.
