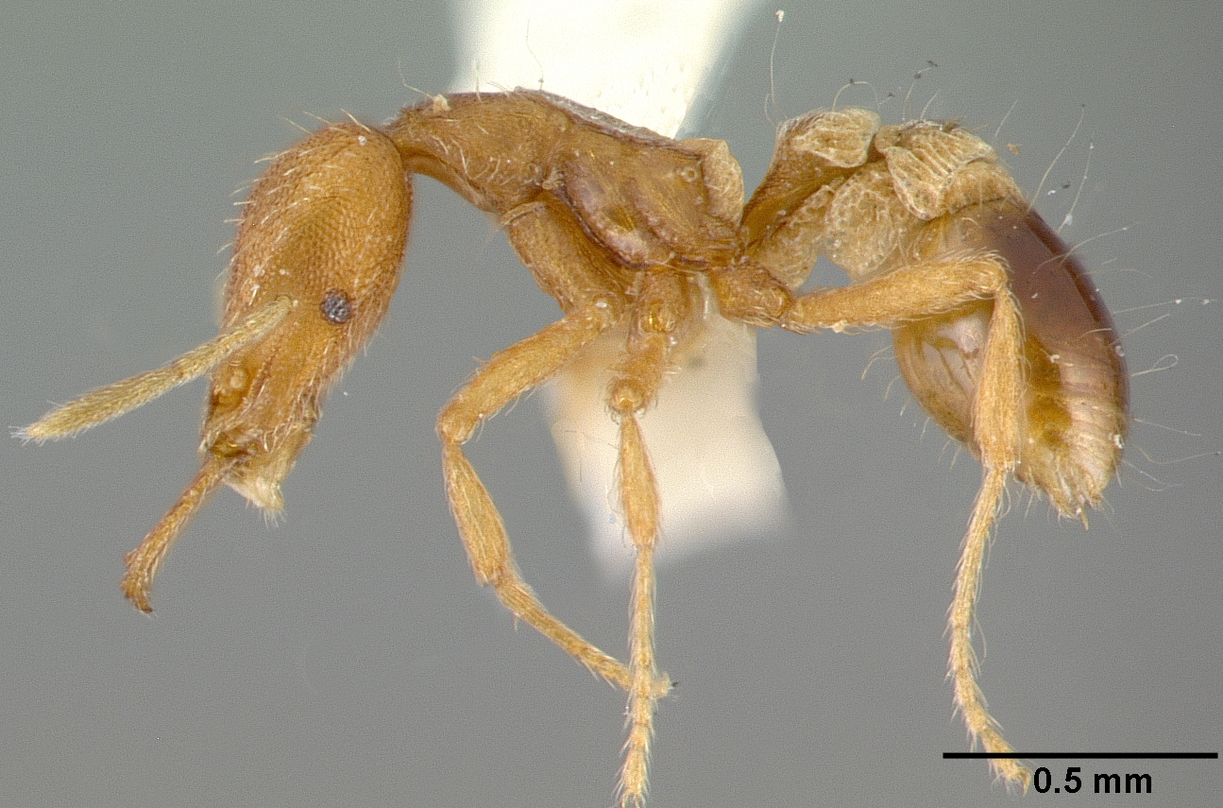

Scientific classification
- Kingdom: Animalia
- Phylum: Arthropoda
- Clade: Pancrustacea
- Class: Insecta
- Order: Hymenoptera
- Family: Formicidae
- Subfamily: Myrmicinae
- Genus: Strumigenys
- Species: S. lewisi

Binomial name
- Strumigenys lewisi Cameron, 1886

= Strumigenys lewisi =

Species of ant

Strumigenys lewisi is one of more than 185 species in the genus Strumigenys. It is found in Philippines, Sri Lanka, Myanmar, Taiwan, Vietnam, China, North Korea, Japan, Malta, and South Korea. The ant is sometimes known as Japanese ant, due to its type specimen was found from Japan.
