= Strumigenys trada =

Scientific classification
- Kingdom: Animalia
- Phylum: Arthropoda
- Clade: Pancrustacea
- Class: Insecta
- Order: Hymenoptera
- Family: Formicidae
- Subfamily: Myrmicinae
- Genus: Strumigenys
- Species: S. trada

Binomial name
- Strumigenys trada Lin, C. C. & Wu, W. J., 1996

Species of ant

Strumigenys trada is a species of ant that is endemic to Taiwan. It has only been recorded from New Taipei City in the north of the island. Workers are yellowish-brown in color and medium-sized, reaching total lengths of 2.20–2.44 mm (0.087–0.096 in).

== Taxonomy ==
Strumigenys trada was formally described in 1996 on the basis of a holotype specimen collected in Wulai in New Taipei City, Taiwan. The specific epithet is derived from the Latin "trade", meaning change. A 2004 study found it to be part of a clade formed by S. solifontis, S. chuchihensis, S. lewisi, S. hispida, and S. minutula within its genus, with weak evidence suggesting that it was most closely related to S. hispida.

== Description ==
Worker Strumigenys trada have yellowish-brown bodies. They are medium-sized, having total lengths ranging from 2.20–2.44 mm (0.087–0.096 in). This species is characterized by its medium size, fairly elongated mandibles that are at least 45% of the length of the head and straight when viewed head-on, a largely glossy propodeum, and eyes that are composed of six ommatidia.

This species is rather similar in appearance to Strumigenys godeffroyi. Compared to S. godeffroyi, S. trada workers are smaller, have a glossy and untextured pronotum, mesonotum and propodeum, have erect hairs but no elongated hairs on the first gastral tergite, and have only six ommatidia instead of ten.

== Distribution ==
Strumigenys trada is a northern Taiwanese endemic, having only been recorded from Wulai and Sanxia in New Taipei City.
