= Strumigenys inopinata =

Scientific classification
- Kingdom: Animalia
- Phylum: Arthropoda
- Clade: Pancrustacea
- Class: Insecta
- Order: Hymenoptera
- Family: Formicidae
- Subfamily: Myrmicinae
- Genus: Strumigenys
- Species: S. inopinata

Binomial name
- Strumigenys inopinata (De Andrade, 1994)

Species of ant

Strumigenys inopinata is a species in the genus Strumigenys. It is found in Sri Lanka.
