= Jeremy Ayers =

American artist, writer, photographer, and musician

- Born: 1948
- Died: October 24, 2016 (aged 67–68)
- Occupations: Artist; writer; photographer; musician

Jeremy Ayers (1948 – October 24, 2016) was an American artist, writer, photographer, and musician.

A member of the Athens, Georgia, creative community, Ayers was a Warhol superstar under the name Sylva Thinn early in his career and wrote a column for Andy Warhol's Interview magazine. He published three books of photography, and co-wrote songs for the B-52's and R.E.M. In 2021, a newly discovered species of ant (Strumigenys ayersthey) was named in his honor.

== Life and death ==
Born Charles Jerry Ayers, he grew up in Athens, Georgia. His father Robert H. Ayers was a civil rights advocate and taught theology at the University of Georgia.

By the early 1970s, Ayers became involved with Andy Warhol's Factory as the androgynous "Sylva Thinn" (also written as "Silva Thin") and he wrote a column for Interview magazine. He also appeared in David Bailey's 1973 documentary on Warhol.

In the late 1970s, Ayers returned to Athens. In the early 1980s, along with four friends, he founded the avant-garde band Limbo District, and was percussionist for the group. Ayers was also credited as co-writer of the song "52 Girls" by the B-52's, released as the B-side of their 1978 debut single and on their 1979 debut album. He also worked with fellow Athens musicians R.E.M., co-writing the song "Old Man Kensey" from the 1985 album Fables of the Reconstruction.

Ayers published three books of photography (Aeronautica, 2011; Today in New York, 2011; and Occupy!, 2012), which featured scenes from Athens, New York City street life, and Occupy Wall Street.

Ayers died of a seizure at the age of 68 on October 24, 2016.

== Legacy ==
Following his death, the Athens Institute for Contemporary Art presented a month-long exhibition featuring Ayers's work titled "Out There: Photographs in the spirit of Jeremy Ayers." In addition to photographs taken by Ayers, the exhibit included photography done by other artists taken "in the same spirit" of his work.

In 2017 Ayers's friend Michael Stipe presented an art installation in his honor at Moogfest in Durham, North Carolina. The installation, titled "Jeremy Dance," featured footage of Ayers dancing to a 120 beats per minute disco song; Stipe then paired the dancing footage with music specially composed (using a Moog synthesizer and a Roland Juno) to match Ayers's movements.

In 2021 German entomologist Phillip Hoenle discovered a new species of ant, which he sent to Yale University taxonomic expert Douglas Booher. After receiving the blessing of Stipe, Booher decided to name the ant Strumigenys ayersthey after Ayers. The "they" in ayersthey refers to the singular they "in a celebration of gender diversity." According to Booher, Ayers himself identified as a gay man; the "they" suffix was intended to honor both Ayers's LGBT activism and the non-binary community.
