= Strumigenys lyroessa =

Scientific classification
- Kingdom: Animalia
- Phylum: Arthropoda
- Clade: Pancrustacea
- Class: Insecta
- Order: Hymenoptera
- Family: Formicidae
- Subfamily: Myrmicinae
- Genus: Strumigenys
- Species: S. lyroessa

Binomial name
- Strumigenys lyroessa (Roger, 1862)

Species of ant

Strumigenys lyroessa is a species of ant found in Bhutan, India, and Sri Lanka.
