= Strumigenys yaleogyna =

Scientific classification
- Kingdom: Animalia
- Phylum: Arthropoda
- Clade: Pancrustacea
- Class: Insecta
- Order: Hymenoptera
- Family: Formicidae
- Subfamily: Myrmicinae
- Genus: Strumigenys
- Species: S. yaleogyna

Binomial name
- Strumigenys yaleogyna (Wilson & Brown, 1956)

Species of ant

Strumigenys yaleogyna is a species of ant in the subfamily Myrmicinae. It is a social parasite associated with Strumigenys loriae, a larger ant species that serves as its host. The species has been recorded in the tropical rainforests of Papua New Guinea and was first scientifically described in 1956 by Edward O. Wilson and William L. Brown Jr.

== Taxonomy ==
Strumigenys yaleogyna was originally described as Kyidris yaleogyna by Wilson and Brown in 1956. The description was published in the scientific journal Insectes Sociaux, in their study of parasitic ants belonging to the genus Kyidris.

The species was subsequently transferred to the genus Pyramica by Barry Bolton in 1999. In 2007, Cesare Baroni Urbani and Maria de Andrade placed it in the genus Strumigenys, its currently accepted classification.

S. yaleogyna belongs to the Strumigenys mutica species group, which includes several closely related ants exhibiting different forms of social parasitism.

== Distribution and habitat ==
Strumigenys yaleogyna is known from New Guinea, particularly Papua New Guinea, where it inhabits tropical rainforest environments.

The original specimens were collected by Edward O. Wilson between 15 and 20 March 1955 near Bisianumu, close to Sogeri, at an elevation of approximately 500 metres above sea level. The specimens were discovered in mixed colonies containing both S. yaleogyna and S. loriae. The original type series included workers, queens and males, with the holotype designated as a queen. Additional specimens have been recorded from rainforest habitats in Papua New Guinea, including material collected from sifted leaf litter.

== Ecology and behaviour ==
=== Social parasitism ===
Strumigenys yaleogyna is notable for its association with Strumigenys loriae. The two species coexist within the same nests, with S. yaleogyna functioning as a social parasite of its larger host species. Unlike some parasitic ants that have lost their worker caste entirely, S. yaleogyna retains workers. However, the species exhibits reduced predatory abilities and relies on its host for activities such as capturing prey.

Observations by Wilson and Brown showed that workers of S. yaleogyna were largely unable to capture prey successfully, while workers of S. loriae performed the hunting activities.

=== Feeding behaviour ===
Workers of S. yaleogyna have been observed collecting honeydew from mealybugs (Pseudococcidae) living on plant roots within nest chambers. This behaviour provides an additional food source for the parasitic species and was documented during the original ecological observations.

=== Colony structure ===
One mixed colony studied by Wilson and Brown was found inside a large, decaying, moss-covered log lying on the rainforest floor. The colony contained approximately 1,170 S. yaleogyna workers, four wingless queens, 84 winged queens and 51 males. The associated S. loriae population contained approximately 1,622 workers and 16 wingless queens. Adults of both species coexisted throughout the nest without obvious hostility. Brood belonging to the two species was found together in several nest chambers.

Researchers also observed trophallaxis, the exchange of liquid food between adult ants, within the mixed colony. These observations provide an example of social parasitism in which the parasite retains a substantial worker population while depending on a closely associated host species.

== Research history ==
The ecological relationship between S. yaleogyna and S. loriae was documented in the original 1956 study by Wilson and Brown. The species has subsequently been discussed in taxonomic and evolutionary research on the genus Strumigenys and the development of social parasitism among ants. Barry Bolton's 2000 revision of the ant tribe Dacetini included a treatment of the species and its taxonomic position.
