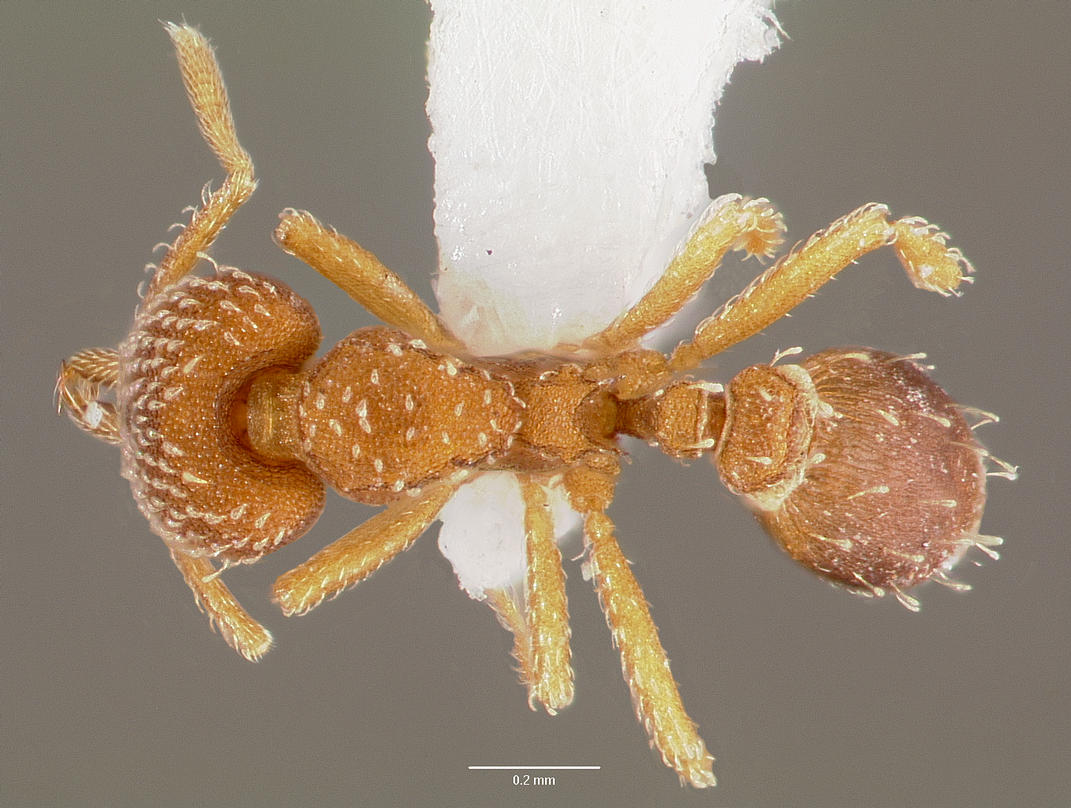

Scientific classification
- Domain: Eukaryota
- Kingdom: Animalia
- Phylum: Arthropoda
- Class: Insecta
- Order: Hymenoptera
- Family: Formicidae
- Subfamily: Myrmicinae
- Tribe: Attini
- Genus: Strumigenys
- Species: S. louisianae

Binomial name
- Strumigenys louisianae Roger, 1863

= Strumigenys louisianae =

Species of ant

Strumigenys louisianae is a species of higher myrmicine in the family Formicidae.

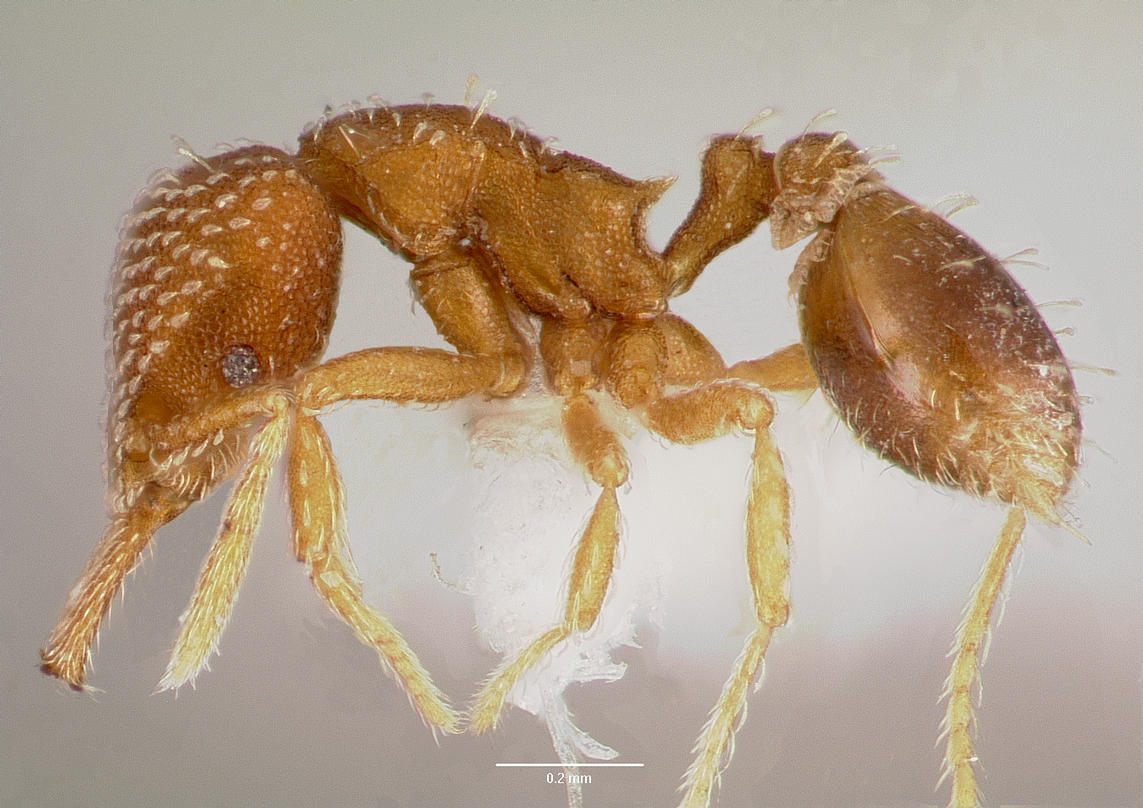
