= Strumigenys formosensis =

Scientific classification
- Kingdom: Animalia
- Phylum: Arthropoda
- Class: Insecta
- Order: Hymenoptera
- Family: Formicidae
- Subfamily: Myrmicinae
- Genus: Strumigenys
- Species: S. formosensis

Binomial name
- Strumigenys formosensis Forel, 1912

Species of ant

Strumigenys formosensis is a species of ant endemic to Taiwan. It is widely distributed within the island at low and middle elevations.

It can be distinguished from other Strumigenys ants found on Taiwan by the sickle-shaped mandibles, clypeus with concave anterior margin and numerous short, broad hairs on the head.
