= Strumigenys veddha =

Scientific classification
- Kingdom: Animalia
- Phylum: Arthropoda
- Clade: Pancrustacea
- Class: Insecta
- Order: Hymenoptera
- Family: Formicidae
- Subfamily: Myrmicinae
- Genus: Strumigenys
- Species: S. veddha

Binomial name
- Strumigenys veddha De Andrade, 2007

Species of ant

Strumigenys veddha is one of more than 185 species in the genus Strumigenys found in Sri Lanka.
