= Strumigenys lichiaensis =

Scientific classification
- Kingdom: Animalia
- Phylum: Arthropoda
- Clade: Pancrustacea
- Class: Insecta
- Order: Hymenoptera
- Family: Formicidae
- Subfamily: Myrmicinae
- Genus: Strumigenys
- Species: S. lichiaensis

Binomial name
- Strumigenys lichiaensis Lin & Wu, 1996

Species of ant

Strumigenys lichiaensis is a species of yellow ant up to 2.8 mm in length. It is endemic to Taiwan, where it has only been documented from Taitung County. Workers are small and yellow in color, growing to a length of 2.10–2.14 mm (0.083–0.084 in). Females are larger, growing to a length of 2.78 mm (0.11 in).

== Taxonomy ==
Strumigenys lichiaensis was formally described in 1996 on the basis of a holotype specimen collected in Lichia in Taitung County, Taiwan. The species is named after its type locality.

== Description ==
Both worker and female Strumigenys lichiaensis have yellow bodies. The workers are fairly small, having total lengths ranging from 2.10–2.14 mm (0.083–0.084 in). Females are larger, growing to a length of 2.78 mm (0.11 in). This species is characterized by its small size, the presence of spatulate hairs only on the sides of the rear of the head, thin spatulate hairs along the top edge of the antennal scrobe, and long spatulate hairs on the upper surface of the mesosoma.

This species can be distinguished from all Taiwanese congeners except Strumigenys liukueiensis by the many stout hairs on the upper surface of the mesosoma and the first gastral tergite. Compared to S. liukueiensis, S. lichiaensis workers are much smaller (growing to a length of only 2.2 mm (0.087 in) instead of 2.5 mm (0.098 in)) and lack erect hairs on the front of the head.

== Distribution ==
Strumigenys lichiaensis is a Taiwanese endemic, having only been recorded from Lichia in Taitung County.
