= Trap-jaw ant (disambiguation) =

Trap-jaw ant may refer to:

- Odontomachus, most prominent genus of trap-jaw ant.
- Acanthognathus, Central and South American genus of ant.
- Anochetus, genus of tropical ant.
- Daceton, genus of tropical ant.
- Epopostruma, an Australasian genus of ant.
- Haidomyrmecini, extinct tribe of ant.
- Microdaceton, an Afrotropical genus of ant.
- Myrmoteras, an Indo-Malayan genus of ant.
- Orectognathus, an Australasian genus of ant.
- Strumigenys, a genus of pantropical ant, with many species considered trap-jaw ants.
