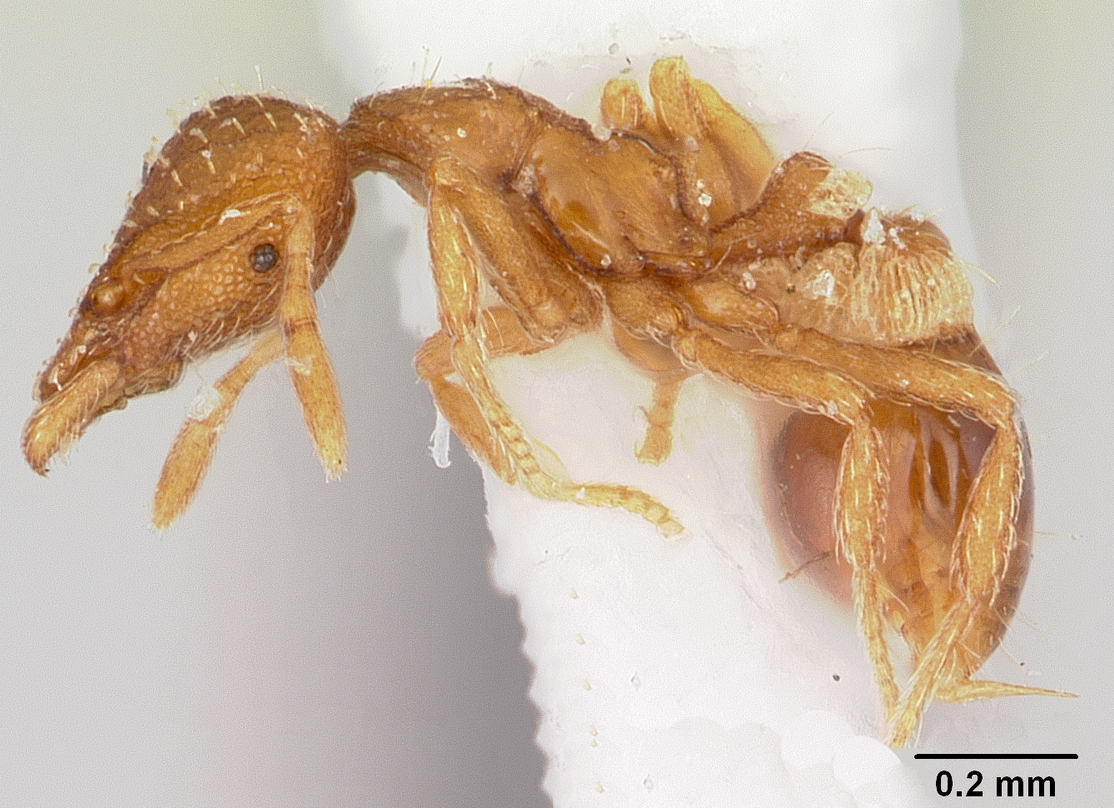
- Strumigenys metazytes worker

Scientific classification
- Kingdom: Animalia
- Phylum: Arthropoda
- Class: Insecta
- Order: Hymenoptera
- Family: Formicidae
- Subfamily: Myrmicinae
- Genus: Strumigenys
- Species: S. metazytes

Binomial name
- Strumigenys metazytes (Bolton, 2000)

Synonyms
- Pyramica metazytes Bolton, 2000

= Strumigenys metazytes =

Species of ant

Strumigenys metazytes is a species of ant in the subfamily Myrmicinae endemic to the Southeastern United States. It is characterized by a distinct diastema on the basal portion of the mandibles with 4 sharp teeth. The species has small hairs, or setae, covering its exoskeleton. The species was described by Bolton in 2000.
