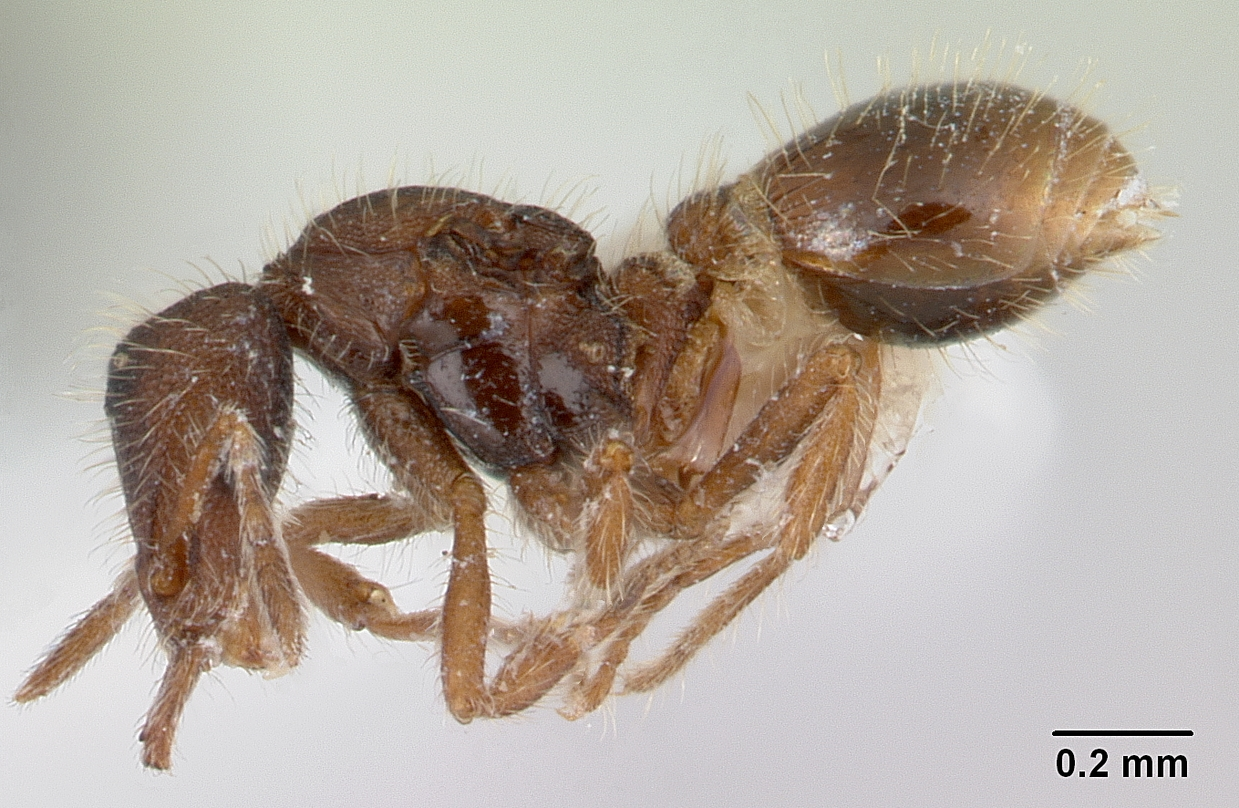
- S. xenos dealate queen

Conservation status
- Vulnerable (IUCN 2.3)

Scientific classification
- Kingdom: Animalia
- Phylum: Arthropoda
- Class: Insecta
- Order: Hymenoptera
- Family: Formicidae
- Subfamily: Myrmicinae
- Genus: Strumigenys
- Species: S. xenos

Binomial name
- Strumigenys xenos Brown, 1955

= Strumigenys xenos =

Species of ant

Strumigenys xenos is a species of ant in the subfamily Myrmicinae. It is a permanent social parasite, which forms no workers and lives in the nests of its host Strumigenys perplexa. It is found in Australia and New Zealand. Its IUCN Red List status was last updated in 01 August 1996, and could be outdated.
