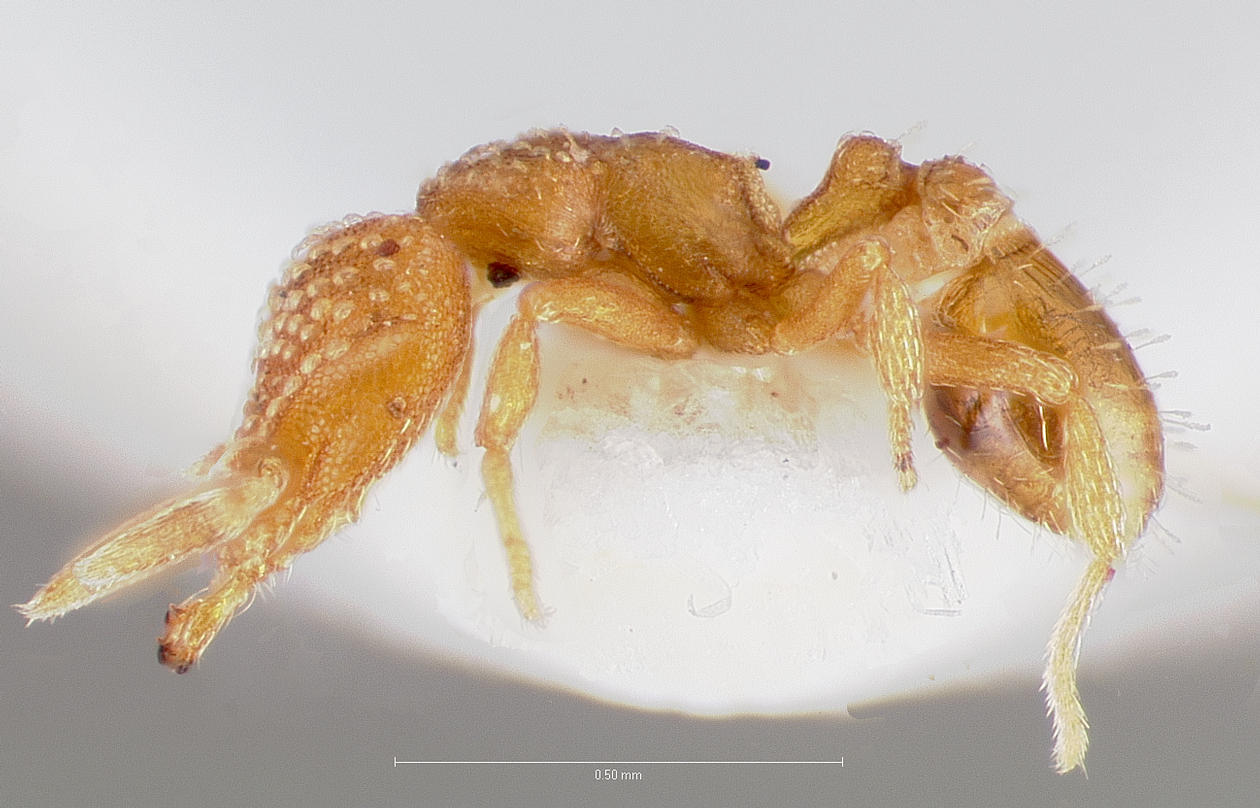
- Strumigenys emmae worker

Scientific classification
- Domain: Eukaryota
- Kingdom: Animalia
- Phylum: Arthropoda
- Class: Insecta
- Order: Hymenoptera
- Family: Formicidae
- Subfamily: Myrmicinae
- Genus: Strumigenys
- Species: S. emmae

Binomial name
- Strumigenys emmae Emery, 1890

= Strumigenys emmae =

Species of ant

Strumigenys emmae is a species of ant in the genus Strumigenys. It is 1.5 millimeters long and is yellowish brown, has a 4 segmented antennae, small eyes, and has hairs on the head, mesosoma, and petiole that are mostly scale-like or orbicular. They are difficult to find other than when encountered in leaf litter samples or pitfall traps. They are normally slow moving, but they can move fast when disturbed. The species first strike usually kills its prey. The species colony is small. It is most often found in beach margins and agricultural areas.
