= Strumigenys lacunosa =

Scientific classification
- Kingdom: Animalia
- Phylum: Arthropoda
- Clade: Pancrustacea
- Class: Insecta
- Order: Hymenoptera
- Family: Formicidae
- Subfamily: Myrmicinae
- Genus: Strumigenys
- Species: S. lacunosa

Binomial name
- Strumigenys lacunosa Lin & Wu, 1996

Species of ant

Strumigenys lacunosa is a species of reddish-brown ant up to 3.4 mm in length. It is endemic to Taiwan. This species can be distinguished from all congeners by the ornate lacunose sculpturing on the head, mesosoma, petiole and postpetiole which gives the ant its specific name.

== Taxonomy ==
Strumigenys lacunosa was formally described in 1996 on the basis of a holotype specimen collected in Chuchih in New Taipei City, Taiwan. The specific epithet is named after the dense pitting on its head and body, which can be described by the anatomical term "lacunose".

== Description ==
Both worker and female Strumigenys lacunosa have reddish-brown bodies. They are small ants, with workers having total lengths ranging from 2.80–3.00 mm (0.11–0.12 in). Females are larger, growing to a length of 3.36–3.38 mm (0.13–0.13 in). This species is characterized by the front margin of the clypeus running transverse to the body (instead of having a deep concave notch), the eyes projecting past the dorsolateral margin of the head, the dense pitting and flocculent hair on the head and mesosoma, the three pairs of elongate hairs projecting from the dorsal sides of the head, the presence of spine-like teeth just prior to the tip of the mandible (although these can also be reduced), a fork at the tip of the mandible with an intercalary denticle nestled in between the spine-like teeth, and sharp and well-developed teeth on the propodeum.

This species is quite distinct from all others in its genus. It can be identified by the dense pitting and flocculent hair on the head, mesosoma, petoile, and post-petiole.

== Distribution ==
Strumigenys lacunosa is a Taiwanese endemic, having only been recorded from the regions of New Taipei City, Nantou County, and Taitung.
