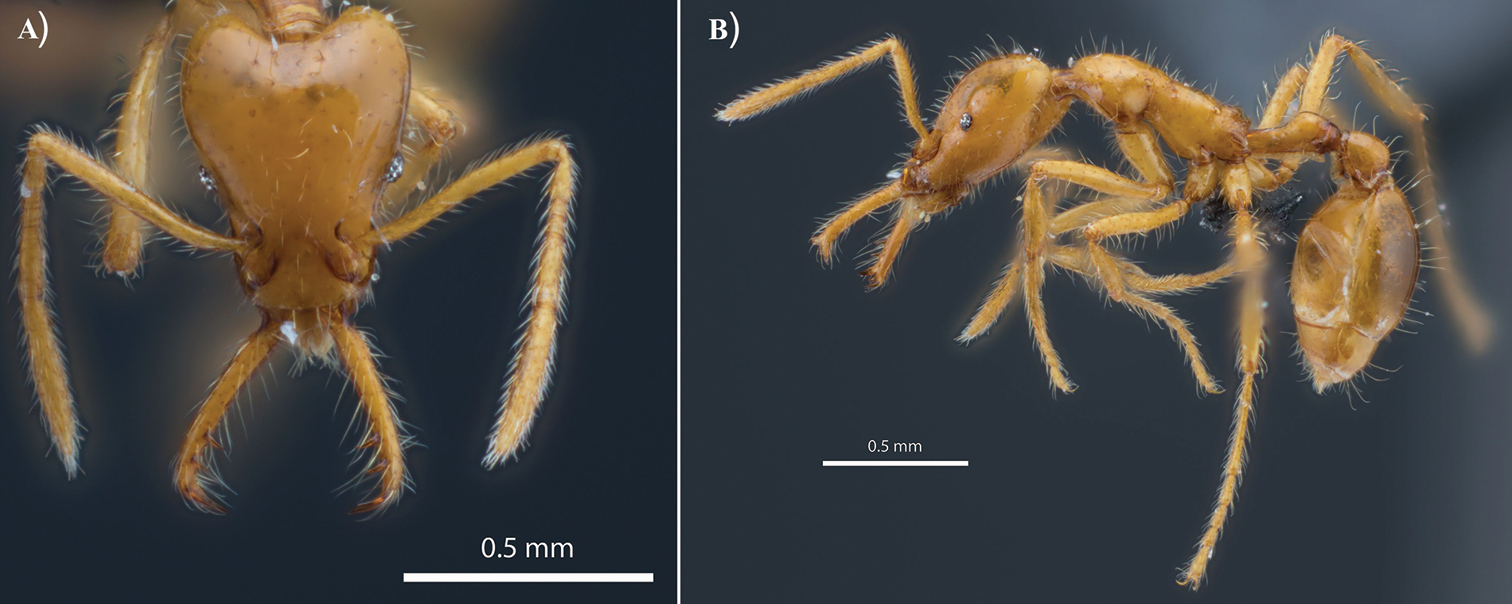

Scientific classification
- Kingdom: Animalia
- Phylum: Arthropoda
- Clade: Pancrustacea
- Class: Insecta
- Order: Hymenoptera
- Family: Formicidae
- Subfamily: Myrmicinae
- Genus: Strumigenys
- Species: S. ayersthey

Binomial name
- Strumigenys ayersthey Booher & Hoenle, 2021

= Strumigenys ayersthey =

Species of ant

Strumigenys ayersthey is a species of ant found in Chocó region of Ecuador. It is the only species belonging to the group of Strumigenys that has a long jaw, bigger jaw structure and lacks stretches in its cuticule.

== Etymology ==
S. ayersthey is named after artist and human rights activist Jeremy Ayers, and is the first species to have a nonbinary binomial name, in honor of Ayers' activism.

Traditionally, binomial nomenclature — how new or revised species are named — follows a grammatical gender binary (see International Code of Zoological Nomenclature § Gender agreement). This means that when a species is named after a human, the specific name (the second of the pair of names) will end with one of two suffixes:

- an "-ae" suffix to honor individual women or groups of women; for example Adelomyrmex dorae after myrmecologist Dora Luz Martínez Tlapa, or
- an "-i" suffix to honor individual men, groups of men, or groups of people of mixed gender; for example, Sphecomyrma freyi after a couple who found that species' type specimen, the Freys.

According to Booher, Ayers himself identified as a gay man; the "they" suffix was intended to honor both Ayers's LGBT activism and the non-binary community.

== Appearance ==
S. ayersthey has little to no sculpturing anywhere on its body and has only fine simple to flagellate setae, whereas mandibularis species group members are predominantly sculptured and not shining with mostly decumbent to appressed apically expanded or flattened setae.

== See also ==
- Shattuck, Steve, ed. (2011). "Strumigenys ayersthey". AntWiki. Steve Shattuck.
