= Strumigenys liukueiensis =

Scientific classification
- Domain: Eukaryota
- Kingdom: Animalia
- Phylum: Arthropoda
- Class: Insecta
- Order: Hymenoptera
- Family: Formicidae
- Subfamily: Myrmicinae
- Genus: Strumigenys
- Species: S. liukueiensis

Binomial name
- Strumigenys liukueiensis Terayama & Kubota, 1989

Species of ant

Strumigenys liukueiensis is a species of ant endemic to Taiwan.

This ant is similar to Strumigenys solifontis but can be identified by the abundant hairs on the head and mesosoma. The only similarly hairy Strumigenys ant found in Taiwan is S. lichiaensis which is much smaller than S. liukueiensis.
