= Strumigenys hispida =

Scientific classification
- Kingdom: Animalia
- Phylum: Arthropoda
- Clade: Pancrustacea
- Class: Insecta
- Order: Hymenoptera
- Family: Formicidae
- Subfamily: Myrmicinae
- Genus: Strumigenys
- Species: S. hispida

Binomial name
- Strumigenys hispida Lin & Wu, 1996

Species of ant

Strumigenys hispida is a species of yellow ant up to 3 mm in length. It is endemic to Taiwan. This ant is very similar to Strumigenys solifontis but there are several distinguishing features including much more prominent lamellae on the propodeum, and mesosoma with a flatter upper profile.

== Taxonomy ==
Strumigenys hispida was formally described in 1996 on the basis of a holotype specimen collected in Chitou in Nantou County, Taiwan. The specific epithet is derived from the Latin "hispidus", meaning hair. A 2004 study found it to be part of a clade formed by S. solifontis, S. chuchihensis, S. lewisi, S. trada, and S. minutula within its genus, with weak evidence suggesting that it was most closely related to S. trada.

== Description ==
Both worker and female Strumigenys hispida have yellow bodies. They are small ants, with workers having total lengths ranging from 2.70–2.90 mm (0.11–0.11 in). Females are larger, growing to a length of 2.80–3.00 mm (0.11–0.12 in). This species is characterized by the front margin of the clypeus running transverse to the body (instead of having a deep concave notch), the eyes projecting past the dorsolateral margin of the head, no flagellate hairs extending sideways from the margin of the head, the absence of simple erect hairs on the first gastral tergite, the presence of only some widely-spaced flagellate hairs on that tergite, spongiform propodeal teeth, and the flat, level scutum of the mesosoma (when viewed side-on).

This species is similar in appearance to Strumigenys solifontis. Compared to S. solifontis, S. hispida workers have more developed propodeal lamellae, fewer hairs on the first gastral tergite, and a flatter, more level mesosoma (when viewed side-on).

== Distribution ==
Strumigenys hispida is a Taiwanese endemic, having only been recorded from the regions of New Taipei City, Chiayi County, Nantou, and Yilan.
