= Strumigenys minutula =

Scientific classification
- Domain: Eukaryota
- Kingdom: Animalia
- Phylum: Arthropoda
- Class: Insecta
- Order: Hymenoptera
- Family: Formicidae
- Subfamily: Myrmicinae
- Genus: Strumigenys
- Species: S. minutula

Binomial name
- Strumigenys minutula Terayama & Kubota, 1989

Species of ant

Strumigenys minutula is a species of ant found in Japan and Taiwan.

This is the smallest ant in its genus (workers less than 2 millimetres (0.079 in) in length) and can be easily identified by size alone, as well as by characteristically short, strongly curved mandibles.
