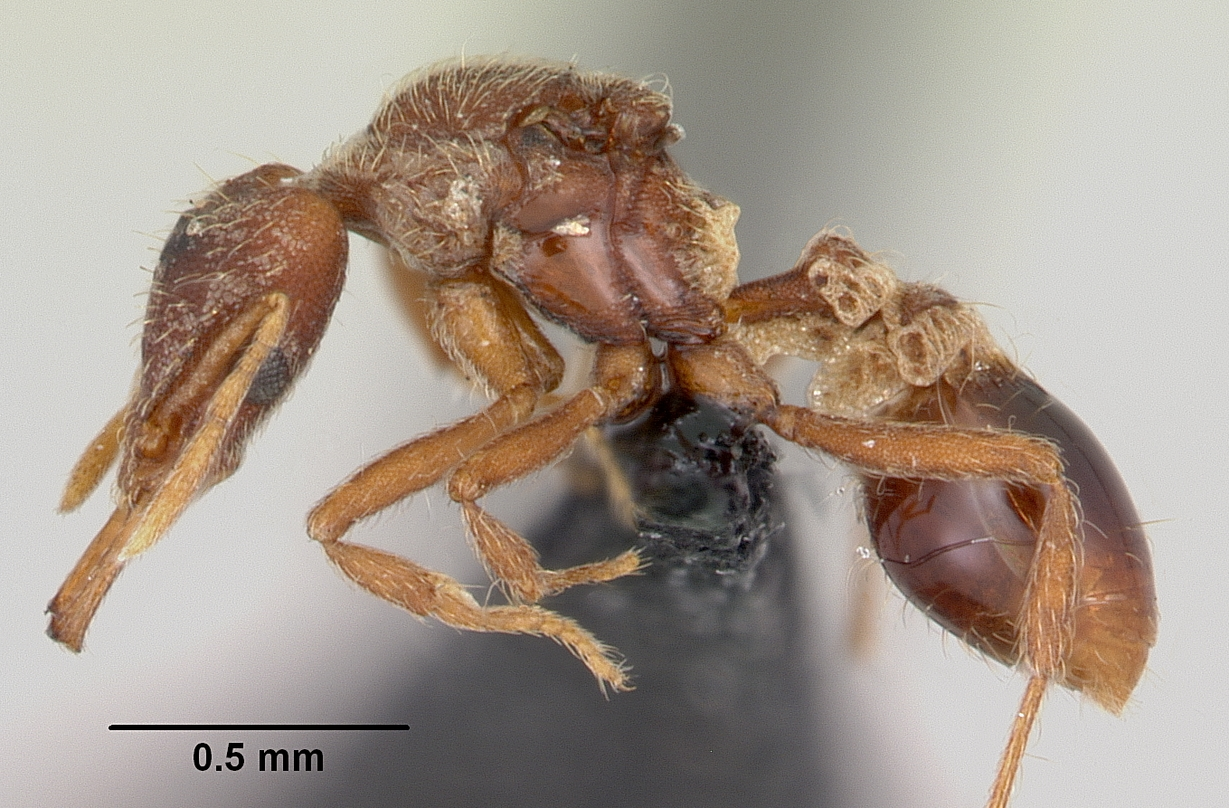
- S. godeffroyi dealate queen

Scientific classification
- Domain: Eukaryota
- Kingdom: Animalia
- Phylum: Arthropoda
- Class: Insecta
- Order: Hymenoptera
- Family: Formicidae
- Subfamily: Myrmicinae
- Genus: Strumigenys
- Species: S. godeffroyi

Binomial name
- Strumigenys godeffroyi Mayr, 1866

= Strumigenys godeffroyi =

Species of ant

Strumigenys godeffroyi is a species of ant. This is a very widespread species found in South East Asia as far east as southern India and Sri Lanka, and also Indonesia, the Philippines, Taiwan, New Guinea, northern Australia and much of Oceania.

It is very similar to several congeners but can usually be distinguished by the dorsal surface of the thorax bearing two pairs of long hairs.
