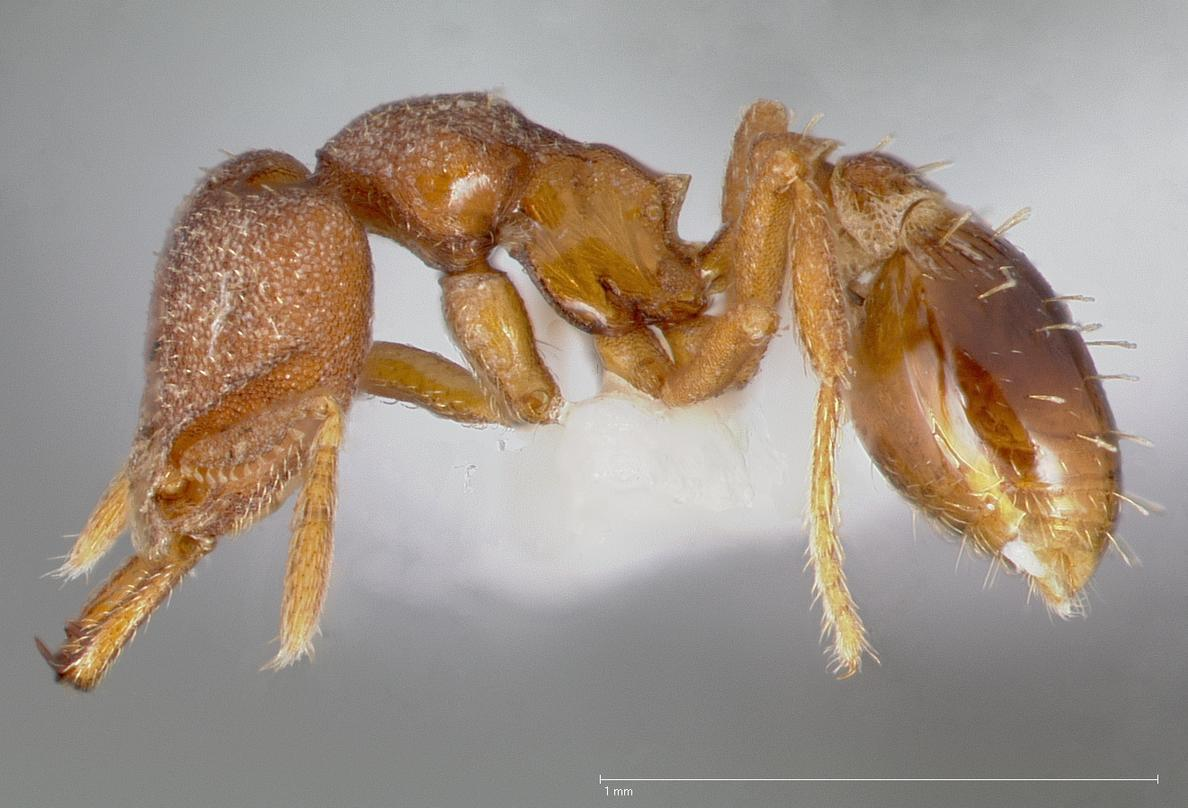
- Strumigenys abdera worker

Scientific classification
- Kingdom: Animalia
- Phylum: Arthropoda
- Clade: Pancrustacea
- Class: Insecta
- Order: Hymenoptera
- Family: Formicidae
- Subfamily: Myrmicinae
- Tribe: Attini
- Genus: Strumigenys; F. Smith, 1860

Type species
- Strumigenys mandibularis F. Smith, 1860

Diversity
- 897 species

Synonyms
- List of synonyms: Asketogenys Brown, 1972 Borgmeierita Brown, 1953 Cephaloxys Smith, F., 1865 Chelystruma Brown, 1950 Cladarogenys Brown, 1976 Codiomyrmex Wheeler, W.M., 1916 Codioxenus Santschi, 1931 Dorisidris Brown, 1948 Dysedrognathus Taylor, 1968 Eneria Donisthorpe, 1948 Epitritus Emery, 1869 Glamyromyrmex Wheeler, W.M., 1915 Gymnomyrmex Borgmeier, 1954 Kyidris Brown, 1949 Labidogenys Roger, 1862 Miccostruma Brown, 1948 Neostruma Brown, 1948 Pentastruma Forel, 1912 Platystruma Brown, 1953 Polyhomoa Azuma, 1950 Proscopomyrmex Patrizi, 1946 Pyramica Roger, 1862 Quadristruma Brown, 1949 Serrastruma Brown, 1948 Smithistruma Brown, 1948 Tingimyrmex Mann, 1926 Trichoscapa Emery, 1869 Weberistruma Brown, 1948 Wessonistruma Brown, 1948

= Strumigenys =

Genus of ants

Strumigenys is a genus of ants in the subfamily Myrmicinae. It is a widespread, speciose genus of small ants with cryptic lifestyles that are predators of small arthropod prey.

== Biology ==
=== Nesting and Foraging ===
Strumigenys are small ants with mainly predatory diets, though they may occasionally feed on sugar sources such as extrafloral nectaries as well. Members of the genus are specialist predators of small arthropods. The most common prey items are springtails but a wide variety of other small arthropod prey have been documented as well.

Most forage solitarily for small prey among organic debris like leaf litter and dead wood, though some are known to forage arboreally and some intranidally. Nesting habits are various, nests are most commonly found in soil, under rocks, and in or under dead wood and logs, but have also been found under bark or among epiphytes. Some nest alongside other ants as xenobiosis or social parasitism.

=== Relationships with other ants ===
A notable aspect of the genus' biology is its interactions with other ants. Multiple species of Strumigenys have been documented living alongside other ants. These symbioses range from social parasitism to proposed mutualism. Some representative cases of these various relationships are included here.

Strumigenys maynei lives in the nests of the much larger ponerine ant Platythyrea conradti, and has been observed predating on arthropods within the Platythyrea nest and may defend the nest against other ants. A similar relationship is also known in Strumigenys arizonica, which obligately lives within the nests of the fungus-farming ant Trachymyrmex arizonensis, and feeds on springtails within the nests. The former case has been proposed as a mutualism while the latter may be mutualism or commensalism.

Other species, such as Strumigenys pergandei, are more facultative in their relationships with other ants. S. pergandei is often found within the nests of larger ants such as Aphaenogaster, Camponotus, and Formica, but can also be found nesting independently under rocks and in leaf litter.

Strumigenys yaleogyna is an inquiline parasite that lives in the nest of its free-living host species, Strumigenys loriae. S. yaleogyna workers have been observed foraging, attempting hunting, and tending coccids but are outperformed by their hosts, showing a reduced hunting ability associated with this form of parasitism.

Strumigenys xenos is a workerless inquiline parasite of the closely-related free-living species Strumigenys perplexa. It produces no worker caste of its own and relies on S. perplexa workers to care for it. The S. xenos queen is attractive to the S. perplexa workers and they will constantly tend to it and evacuate it in response to threats.

=== Trap-jaw mandibles ===
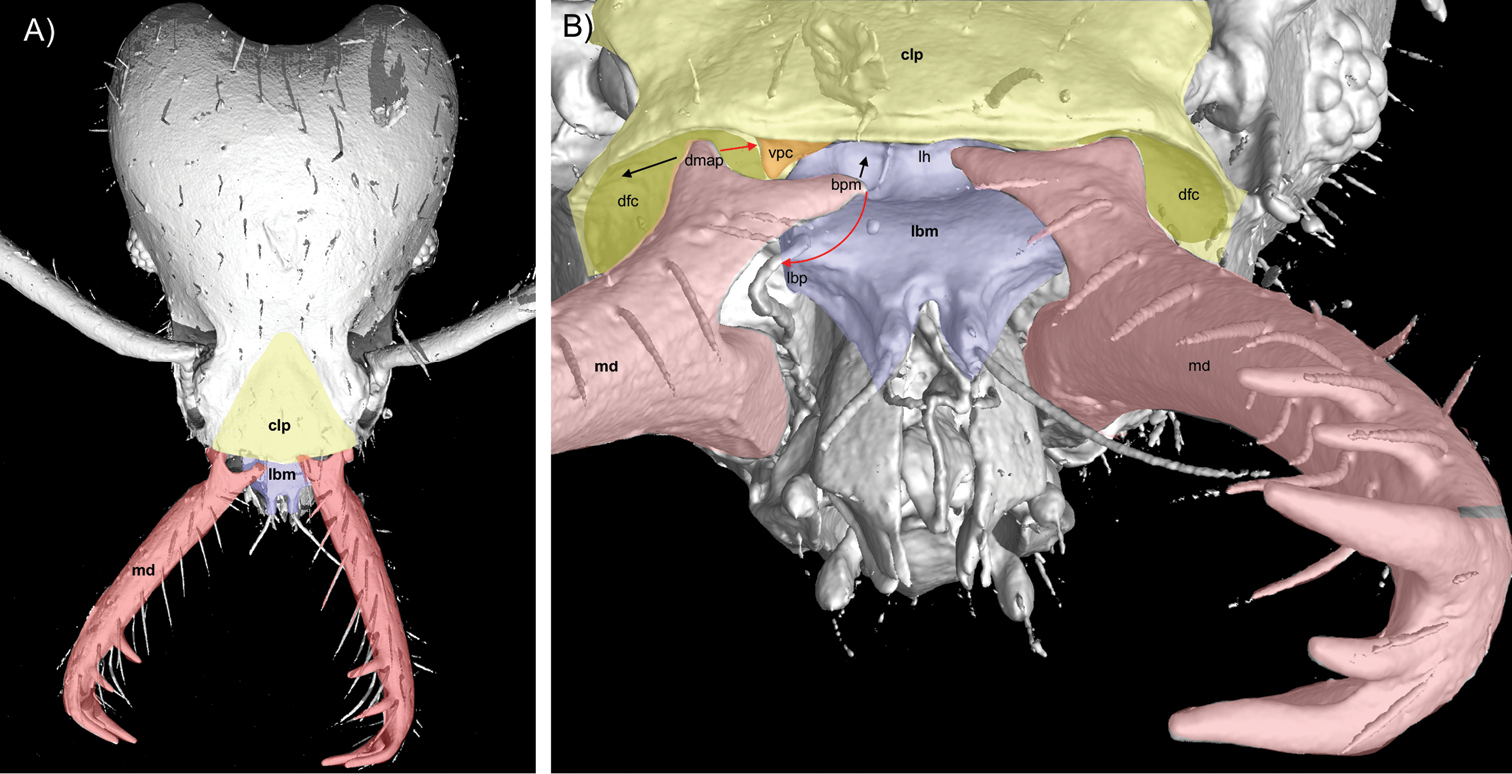
Trap-jaw mouthparts of Strumigenys ayersthey, with the clypeus, mandibles, and labrum highlighted

Mouthpart morphology is quite variable and diverse within Strumigenys, which has contributed to a complicated taxonomic history. Many members of the genus are trap-jaw ants, with modified mouthparts that assist in hunting. The trap-jaw mouthparts involve a modified labrum which interacts with a basal mandibular process to lock the mandibles open. From this position the mandibles can snap shut with considerable speed once triggered, which is achieved with sensory "trigger" setae. Mandible morphology within the genus has been categorized into gripping, short-trap, or long-trap mandibles based on the length of the mandible and whether a trap-jaw latch mechanism is present. Short-trap and long-trap mandibles have both independently evolved from a gripping ancestral form multiple times, as well as transitions to short-trap from long-trap lineages.

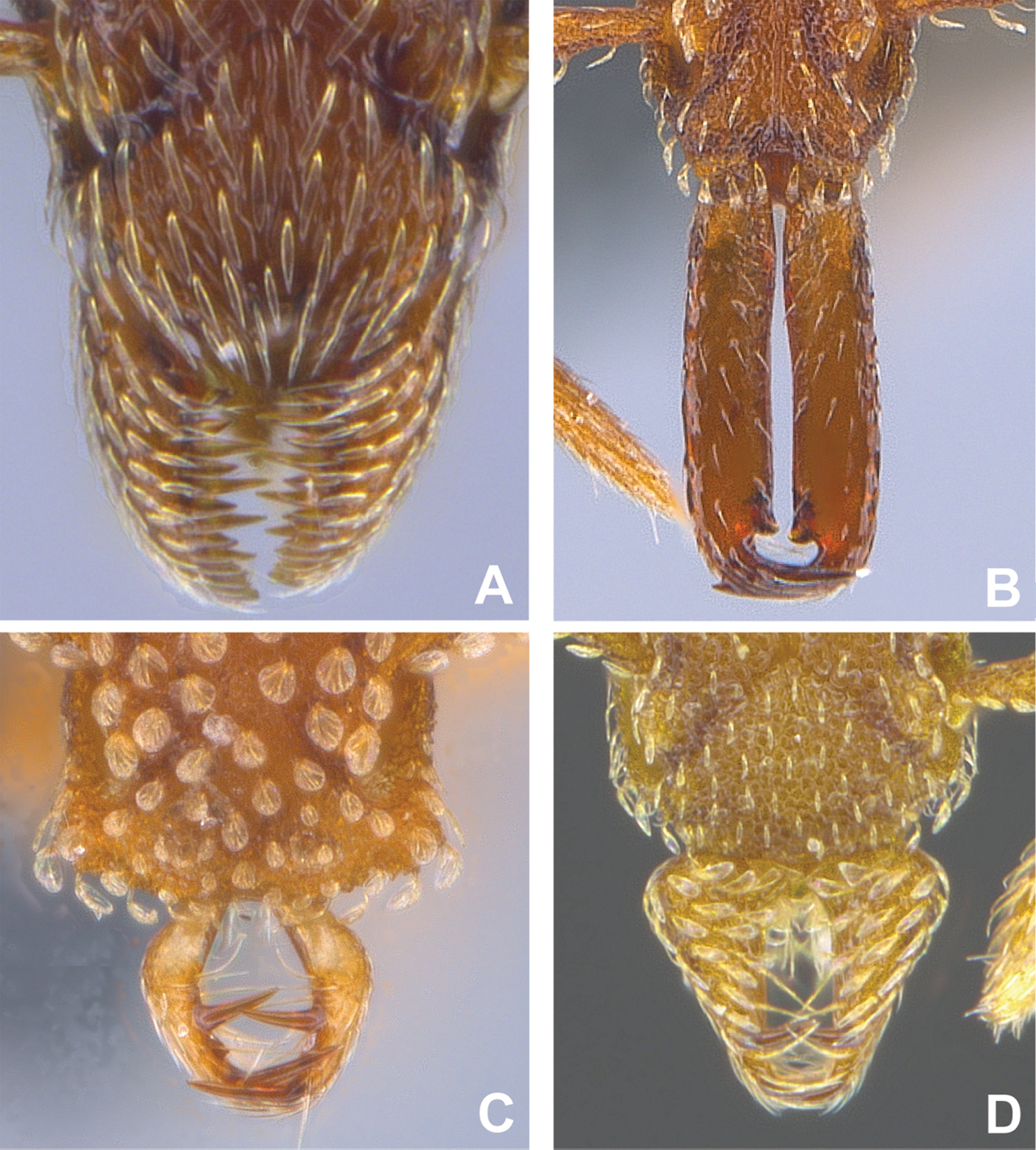
Strumigenys mandible diversity

== Distribution ==
The genus is broadly distributed with most of its diversity occurring in tropical rainforests around the world, but a number of species occur in more Mediterranean or temperate climates. In tropical regions, Strumigenys is often an abundant component of the litter community.

In terms of regional diversity, the known fauna of Strumigenys is distributed as follows: 139 species are known from the Afrotropical region, 60 from the Australasian region, 258 from the Indo-Australian region, 94 from the Malagasy region, 59 from the Nearctic region, 214 from the Neotropical region, 97 from the Oriental region, and 81 from the Palearctic region.

== Identification and taxonomy ==
One of the most distinctive characters of the genus Strumigenys is the presence of spongiform tissue — a "honeycomb-like", foveolate extension of the cuticle — on the anterior segments of the metasoma in the majority of species, though spongiform tissue is convergently present in two unrelated ant genera, Dacetinops and Tetheamyrma. In Strumigenys this spongiform tissue is associated with exocrine glands of an unknown function. Strumigenys often have modified setae, such as bent, spatulate, or bulbous, among various other forms. The antennae have reduced segmentation, with four to six antennomeres, and the palps are also reduced with one-segmented labial palps and zero or one-segmented maxillary palps.

The genus Strumigenys is speciose with 884 currently recognized species. Since the establishment of the genus in 1860 by Frederick Smith, it has accumulated twenty-eight generic synonyms. One of the largest and most notable of these is the former genus Pyramica, which has been moved in and out of synonymy with Strumigenys numerous times, with arguments relying largely on the morphology and function of the mandibles and labrum, before the rise of genetic analysis and phylogenetic capabilities.

== Species ==
As of 2026, the genus contains over 880 species. Listed here are a few of the more well-known members of the genus.

- Strumigenys abdera Fisher, 2000
- Strumigenys abdita Wesson & Wesson, 1939
- Strumigenys abditivata (Bolton, 2000)
- Strumigenys acarai Sosa-Calvo et al., 2010
- Strumigenys acheron (Bolton, 2000)
- Strumigenys actis Fisher, 2000
- Strumigenys acubecca (Brown, 1972)
- Strumigenys ayersthey Booher & Hoenle, 2021
- Strumigenys bryanti Wheeler, 1919
- Strumigenys emmae Emery, 1890
- Strumigenys formosensis Forel, 1912
- Strumigenys godeffroyi Mayr, 1866
- Strumigenys heteropha Bolton, 2000
- Strumigenys hirsuta Tang et al., 2019
- Strumigenys hispida Lin & Wu, 1996
- Strumigenys indagatrix Wheeler, 1919
- Strumigenys lacunosa Lin & Wu, 1996
- Strumigenys lanuginosa Wheeler, 1905
- Strumigenys lichiaensis Lin & Wu, 1996
- Strumigenys liukueiensis Terayama & Kubota, 1989
- Strumigenys mandibularis Smith, 1860
- Strumigenys metazytes Bolton, 2000
- Strumigenys minutula Terayama & Kubota, 1989
- Strumigenys nanzanensis Lin & Wu, 1996
- Strumigenys perplexa (Smith, 1876)
- Strumigenys solifontis Brown, 1949
- Strumigenys tenuipilis Emery, 1915
- Strumigenys tigris Brown, 1971
- Strumigenys trada Lin & Wu, 1996
- Strumigenys trinidadensis Wheeler, 1922
- Strumigenys wallacei Emery, 1897
- Strumigenys xenos Brown, 1955

== See also ==
- Trap-jaw ant
