= List of Monomorium species =

This is a list of the extant and extinct (†) species in the ant genus Monomorium.

== A-D ==
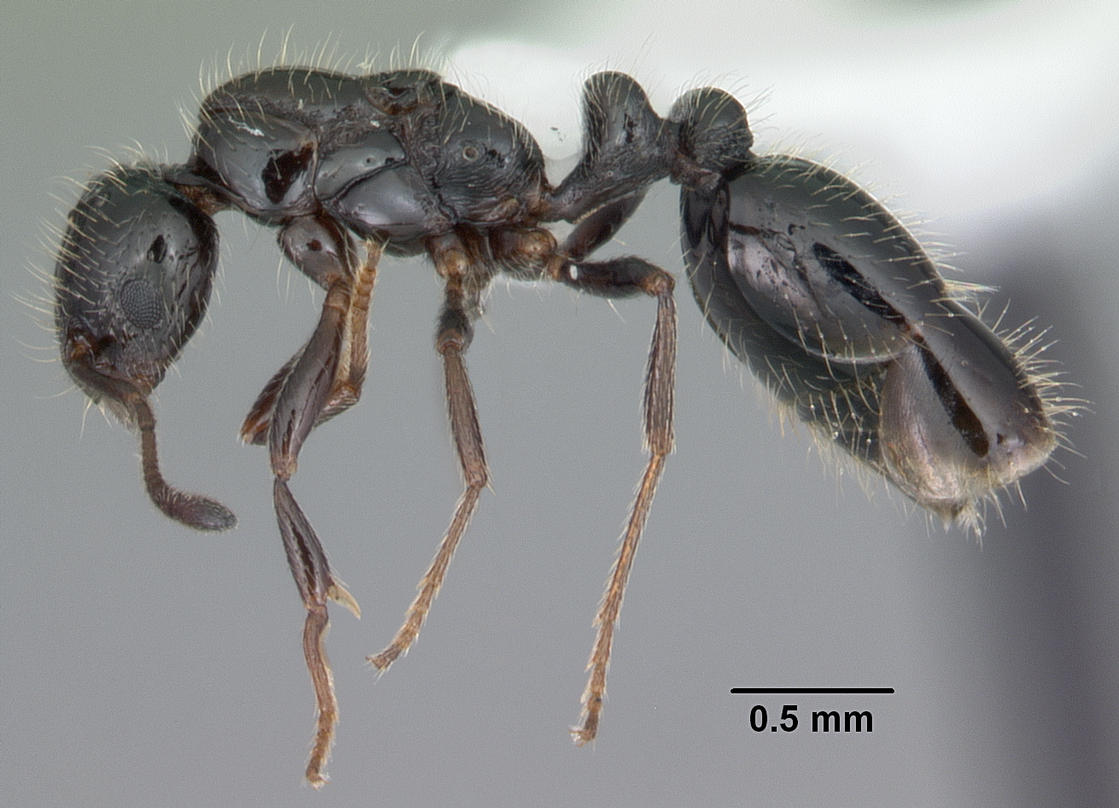
Monomorium carbonarium

- Monomorium abeillei André, 1881
- Monomorium acutinode Collingwood & Agosti, 1996
- Monomorium advena Brown & Wilson, 1957
- Monomorium aeyade Collingwood & Agosti, 1996
- Monomorium affabile Santschi, 1926
- Monomorium afrum André, 1884
- Monomorium aithoderum Heterick, 2001
- Monomorium alamarum Bolton, 1987
- Monomorium albipes Heterick, 2001
- Monomorium albopilosum Emery, 1895
- Monomorium algiricum (Bernard, 1955)
- Monomorium altinode Santschi, 1910
- Monomorium anceps Emery, 1895
- Monomorium anderseni Heterick, 2001
- Monomorium andrei Saunders, 1890
- Monomorium angustinode Forel, 1913
- Monomorium annamense Donisthorpe, 1941
- Monomorium antarcticum (Smith, 1858)
- Monomorium anthracinum Heterick, 2001
- Monomorium antipodum Forel, 1901
- Monomorium aper Emery, 1914
- Monomorium arboreum Weber, 1943
- Monomorium arenarium Heterick, 2001
- Monomorium areniphilum Santschi, 1911
- Monomorium arnoldi Forel, 1913
- Monomorium asiriense Collingwood & Agosti, 1996
- Monomorium atomum Forel, 1902
- Monomorium australe Emery, 1886
- Monomorium baal Wheeler & Mann, 1916
- Monomorium balathir Bolton, 1987
- Monomorium banksi Forel, 1910
- Monomorium barbatulum Mayr, 1877
- Monomorium bequaerti Forel, 1913
- Monomorium bevisi Arnold, 1944
- Monomorium bicolor Emery, 1877
- Monomorium bicorne Forel, 1907
- Monomorium bimaculatum Wheeler, 1928
- Monomorium binatu Bolton, 1987
- Monomorium biroi Forel, 1907
- Monomorium biroianum Bolton, 1995
- Monomorium bodenheimeri Menozzi, 1929
- Monomorium boerorum Forel, 1910
- Monomorium boltoni Espadaler & Agosti, 1987
- Monomorium borlei Santschi, 1937
- Monomorium brasiliense Forel, 1908
- Monomorium braunsi Mayr, 1910
- Monomorium broomense Forel, 1915
- Monomorium broschorum Sparks, 2015
- Monomorium butteli Forel, 1913
- Monomorium buxtoni Crawley, 1920
- Monomorium capeyork Sparks, 2015
- Monomorium captator Santschi, 1936
- Monomorium carbo Forel, 1910
- Monomorium carbonarium (Smith, 1858)
- Monomorium centrale Forel, 1910
- Monomorium chinense Santschi, 1925
- Monomorium clavicorne André, 1881
- Monomorium compressum Wheeler, 1914
- Monomorium consternens (Walker, 1859)
- Monomorium crawleyi Santschi, 1930
- Monomorium creticum (Emery, 1908)
- Monomorium croceiventre Emery, 1914
- Monomorium cryptobium (Santschi, 1921)
- Monomorium cyaneum Wheeler, 1914
- Monomorium dakarense Santschi, 1914
- Monomorium damarense Forel, 1910
- Monomorium delagoense Forel, 1894
- Monomorium demisum Santschi, 1936
- Monomorium dentigerum (Roger, 1862)
- Monomorium dichroum Forel, 1902
- Monomorium dictator Santschi, 1937
- Monomorium dilatatum Bernard, 1977
- Monomorium disertum Forel, 1913
- Monomorium disoriente Bolton, 1987
- Monomorium dolatu Bolton, 1987
- Monomorium donisthorpei Crawley, 1915
- Monomorium drapenum Bolton, 1987
- Monomorium draxocum Bolton, 1987

== E-H ==
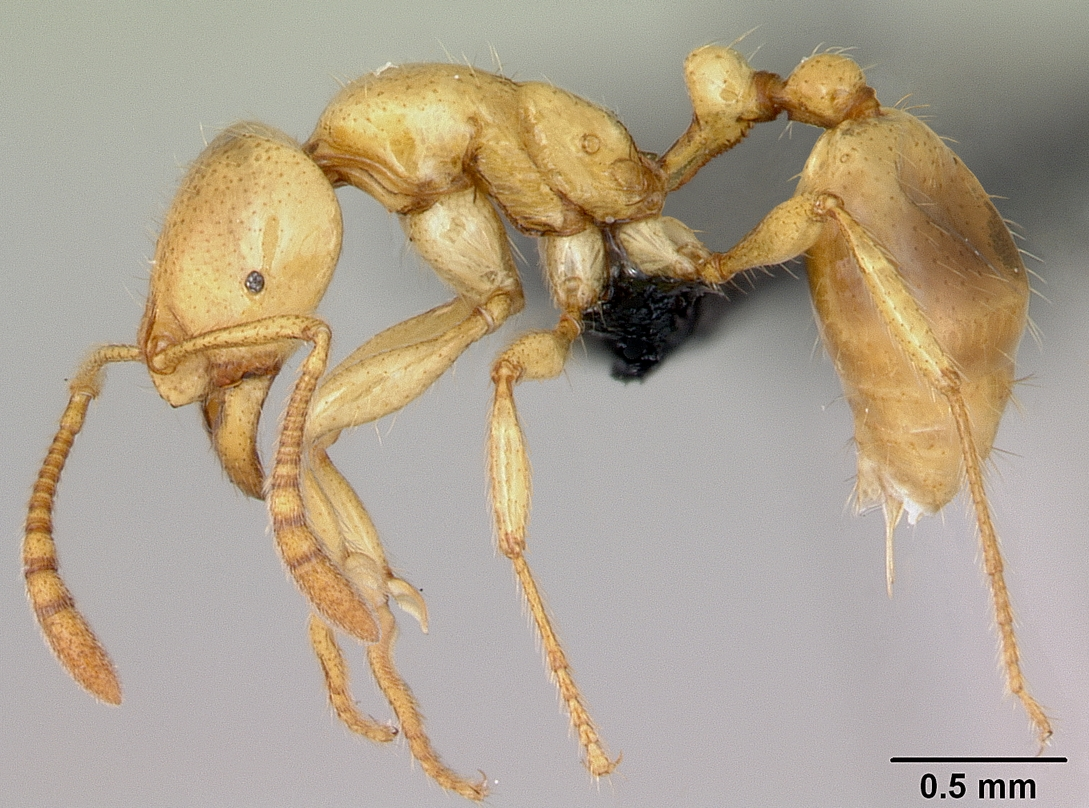
Monomorium fisheri

- Monomorium ebangaense Santschi, 1937
- Monomorium ebeninum Forel, 1891
- Monomorium edentatum Emery, 1897
- Monomorium effractor Bolton, 1987
- Monomorium egens Forel, 1910
- Monomorium elgonense (Santschi, 1935)
- Monomorium elongatum Smith, 1876
- Monomorium emarginatum DuBois, 1986
- Monomorium eremoides Sparks, 2015
- Monomorium eremum Sparks, 2015
- Monomorium ergatogyna Wheeler, 1904
- Monomorium esharre Bolton, 1987
- Monomorium evansi Donisthorpe, 1918
- Monomorium excelsior Arnold, 1926
- Monomorium excensurae Forel, 1915
- Monomorium exchao Santschi, 1926
- Monomorium exiguum Forel, 1894
- Monomorium falcatum (McAreavey, 1949)
- Monomorium fasciatum Santschi, 1920
- Monomorium fastidium Bolton, 1987
- Monomorium fieldi Forel, 1910
- Monomorium firmum Santschi, 1926
- Monomorium flavigaster (Clark, 1938)
- Monomorium flavipes Clark, 1938
- Monomorium flavum Collingwood, 1961
- Monomorium floricola (Jerdon, 1851)
- Monomorium forcipatum Emery, 1914
- Monomorium foreli Viehmayer, 1914
- Monomorium fraterculum Santschi, 1919
- Monomorium fridae Forel, 1905
- Monomorium fugelanum Bolton, 1987
- Monomorium gabrielense Forel, 1916
- Monomorium gallicum Seifert, 2025
- Monomorium geminum Sparks, 2015
- Monomorium gilberti Forel, 1902
- Monomorium grassei (Tohme, 1980)
- Monomorium guillarmodi Arnold, 1946
- Monomorium guineense (Bernard, 1953)
- Monomorium hanneli Forel, 1907
- Monomorium hannonis Santschi, 1910
- Monomorium havilandi Forel, 1910
- Monomorium hercules Viehmeyer, 1923
- Monomorium herero Forel, 1910
- Monomorium hertogi Sparks, 2015
- Monomorium hesperium Emery, 1915
- Monomorium hildebrandti Forel, 1892
- Monomorium hirsutum Forel, 1910
- Monomorium hoffmanni Sparks, 2015
- Monomorium holothir Bolton, 1987
- Monomorium hospitum Viehmeyer, 1916
- Monomorium howense Wheeler, 1927

== I-L ==
- Monomorium iligii Forel, 1894
- Monomorium ilium Forel, 1907
- Monomorium imerinense Forel, 1892
- Monomorium impexum Wheeler, 1928
- Monomorium indicum Forel, 1902
- Monomorium inquietum Santschi, 1926
- Monomorium inquilinum DuBois, 1981
- Monomorium insolescens Wheeler, 1934
- Monomorium insulare Clark, 1938
- Monomorium intrudens Smith, 1874
- Monomorium invidium Bolton, 1987
- Monomorium iyenasu Bolton, 1987
- Monomorium jacksoni Bolton, 1987
- Monomorium jonesi Arnold, 1952
- Monomorium junodi Forel, 1910
- Monomorium katir Bolton, 1987
- Monomorium kalapre Bolton, 1987
- Monomorium kempi Mukerjee, 1930
- Monomorium kidman Sparks, 2015
- Monomorium kiliani Forel, 1902
- Monomorium kineti Weber, 1943
- Monomorium kitectum Bolton, 1987
- Monomorium kugitangi Dlussky, 1990
- Monomorium laeve Mayr, 1876
- Monomorium latinodoides Wheeler, 1928
- Monomorium leae Forel, 1913
- Monomorium lene Santschi, 1920
- Monomorium leopoldinum Forel, 1905
- Monomorium libanicum Tohme, 1980
- Monomorium liliuokalanii Forel, 1899
- Monomorium lindbergi Pisarski, 1967
- Monomorium longi Forel, 1902
- Monomorium longiceps Wheeler, 1934
- Monomorium lorenzoi Seifert, 2025
- Monomorium longipes Emery, 1914
- Monomorium lubricum Arnold, 1948
- Monomorium luisae Forel, 1904
- Monomorium luteum Emery, 1881

== M-N ==
- Monomorium macareaveyi (Ettershank, 1966)
- Monomorium macrops Arnold, 1944
- Monomorium madecassum Forel, 1892
- Monomorium major Bernard, 1953
- Monomorium malamixtum Bolton, 1987
- Monomorium malatu Bolton, 1987
- Monomorium manir Bolton, 1987
- Monomorium mantazenum Bolton, 1987
- Monomorium marjoriae DuBois, 1986
- Monomorium marshi Bolton, 1987
- Monomorium maryannae Sparks, 2015
- Monomorium mavide Bolton, 1987
- Monomorium mayrianum Wheeler, 1915
- Monomorium medinae Forel, 1892
- Monomorium mediocre Santschi, 1920
- Monomorium melleum Emery, 1914
- Monomorium merepah Sparks
- Monomorium micron Crawley, 1925
- Monomorium micropacum Bolton, 1987
- Monomorium mictile Forel, 1910
- Monomorium minor Stitz, 1923
- Monomorium mirandum Arnold, 1955
- Monomorium mitchell Sparks, 2015
- Monomorium modestum Santschi, 1914
- Monomorium monomorium Bolton, 1987
- Monomorium musicum Forel, 1910
- Monomorium nengraharicum Pisarski, 1970
- Monomorium niloticum Emery, 1881
- Monomorium nirvanum Bolton, 1987
- Monomorium nitidiventre Emery, 1893
- Monomorium notulum Forel, 1910
- Monomorium noualhieri (Emery, 1915)
- Monomorium noxitum Bolton, 1987
- Monomorium nuptualis Forel, 1913

== O-S ==
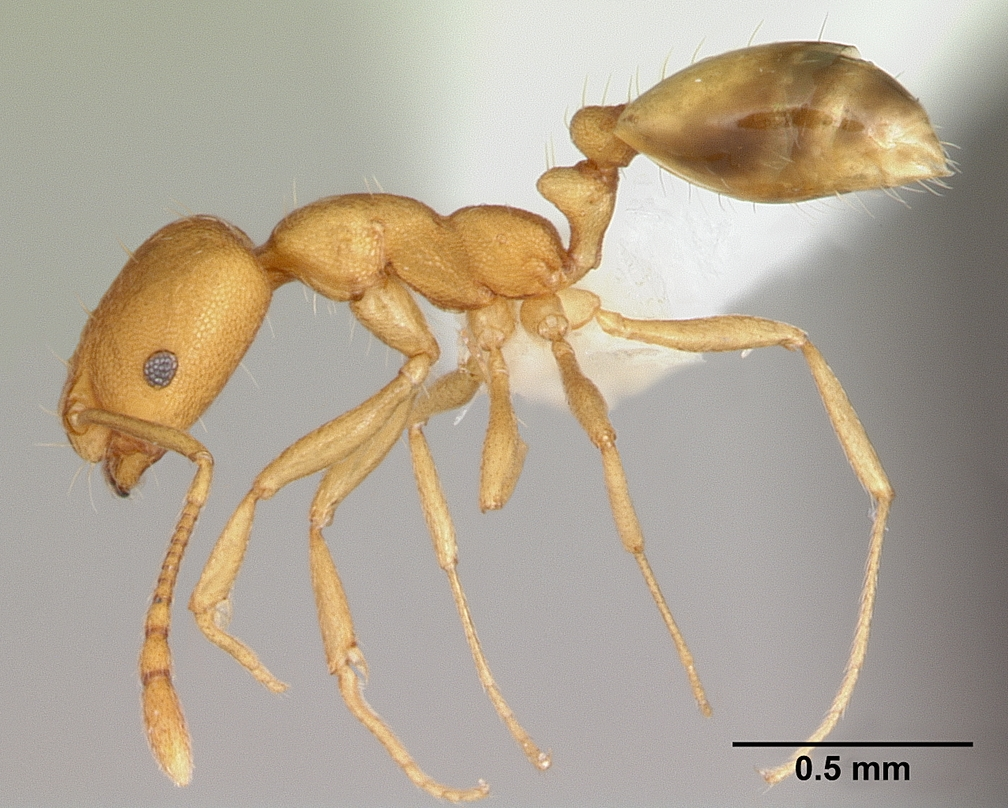
Monomorium pharaonis

- Monomorium occidaneum Crawley, 1922
- Monomorium occidentale Bernard, 1953
- Monomorium ocellatum Arnold, 1920
- Monomorium oodnadatta Sparks, 2015
- Monomorium opacior Forel, 1913
- Monomorium opacum Forel, 1913
- Monomorium ophthalmicum Forel, 1894
- Monomorium orangiae Arnold, 1956
- Monomorium orientale Mayr, 1879
- Monomorium osiridis Santschi, 1915
- Monomorium pacis Forel, 1915
- Monomorium pallidipes Forel, 1910
- Monomorium pallidum Donisthorpe, 1918
- Monomorium parvinode Forel, 1894
- Monomorium paternum Bolton, 1987
- Monomorium pergandei (Emery, 1893)
- Monomorium personatum Santschi, 1937
- Monomorium pharaonis (Linnaeus, 1758)
- Monomorium phoenicum Santschi, 1927
- Monomorium pilbara Sparks, 2015
- Monomorium pilipes Mayr, 1868
- Monomorium pulchrum Santschi, 1926
- Monomorium rabirium Bolton, 1987
- Monomorium rastractum Bolton, 1987
- Monomorium rhopalocerum Emery, 1895
- Monomorium rosae Santschi, 1920
- Monomorium rothsteini Forel, 1902
- Monomorium rotundatum Santschi, 1920
- Monomorium rubriceps Mayr, 1876
- Monomorium rufulum Stitz, 1923
- Monomorium ruzskyi Dlussky & Zabelin, 1985
- Monomorium sagei Forel, 1902
- Monomorium sahlbergi Emery, 1898
- Monomorium sakalavum Santschi, 1928
- Monomorium salamonis (Linnaeus, 1758)
- Monomorium sanguinolentum Wheeler, 1927
- Monomorium santschii (Forel, 1905)
- Monomorium sarawatensis Sharaf & Aldawood, 2013
- Monomorium schultzei Forel, 1910
- Monomorium schurri Forel, 1902
- Monomorium sculpturatum Clark, 1934
- Monomorium sechellense Emery, 1894
- Monomorium senegalense Roger, 1862
- Monomorium sersalatum Bolton, 1987
- Monomorium setuliferum Forel, 1910
- Monomorium shilohense Forel, 1913
- Monomorium shuckardi Forel, 1895
- Monomorium silvestrii Wheeler, 1927
- Monomorium smithii Forel, 1892
- Monomorium sordidum Forel, 1902
- Monomorium spatulicorne Kuznetsov-Ugamsky, 1926
- Monomorium spectrum Bolton, 1987
- Monomorium speculum Sparks, 2015
- Monomorium speluncarum Santschi, 1914
- Monomorium springvalense Forel, 1913
- Monomorium sryetum Bolton, 1987
- Monomorium stagnum Sparks, 2015
- Monomorium strangulatum Santschi, 1921
- Monomorium subapterum Wheeler, 1917
- Monomorium subcoecum Emery, 1894
- Monomorium subdentatum Forel, 1913
- Monomorium subopacum (Smith, 1858)
- Monomorium sutu Bolton, 1987
- Monomorium sydneyense Forel, 1902
- Monomorium symmotu Bolton, 1987
- Monomorium syriacum (Tohme, 1980)

== T-Z ==
- Monomorium tablense Santschi, 1932
- Monomorium taedium Bolton, 1987
- Monomorium talbotae DuBois, 1981
- Monomorium talpa Emery, 1911
- Monomorium tanysum Bolton, 1987
- Monomorium taprobanae Forel, 1913
- Monomorium tchelichofi Forel, 1914
- Monomorium tenebrosum Sparks, 2015
- Monomorium termitarium Forel, 1910
- Monomorium termitobium Forel, 1892
- Monomorium thrascoleptum Bolton, 1987
- Monomorium topend Sparks, 2015
- Monomorium torrens Sparks, 2015
- Monomorium torvicte Bolton, 1987
- Monomorium trake Bolton, 1987
- Monomorium tricolor Emery, 1914
- Monomorium triviale Wheeler, 1906
- Monomorium turneri (Forel, 1910)
- Monomorium tynsorum Bolton, 1987
- Monomorium vaguum Santschi, 1930
- Monomorium valtinum Bolton, 1987
- Monomorium vatranum Bolton, 1987
- Monomorium vecte Bolton, 1987
- Monomorium venustum (Smith, 1858)
- Monomorium viator Santschi, 1923
- Monomorium viridum Brown, 1943
- Monomorium vitiense Mann, 1921
- Monomorium vonatu Bolton, 1987
- Monomorium westi Bolton, 1987
- Monomorium whitei Wheeler, 1915
- Monomorium willomorense Bolton, 1987
- Monomorium wroughtoni Forel, 1902
- Monomorium wroughtonianum Ettershank, 1966
- Monomorium xanthognathum Arnold, 1944
- Monomorium zulu Santschi, 1914
