= A. bidentatus =

A. bidentatus may refer to:

- Abacetus bidentatus, a ground beetle
- Antichthonidris bidentatus, a synonym of Monomorium bidentatum, an ant found in Chile and Argentina
- Astragalus bidentatus, a plant found in Ecuador
