= A. bidentata =

A. bidentata may refer to:

- Acacia bidentata, a whistling thorn
- Achyranthes bidentata, a medicinal plant
- Acontia bidentata, an owlet moth
- Acteocina bidentata, a deepsea snail
- Alucita bidentata, a many-plumed moth
- Antheua bidentata, a prominent moth
- Antichthonidris bidentata, a South American ant
- Aphrophila bidentata, a crane fly
- Austromontia bidentata, a South African harvestman
