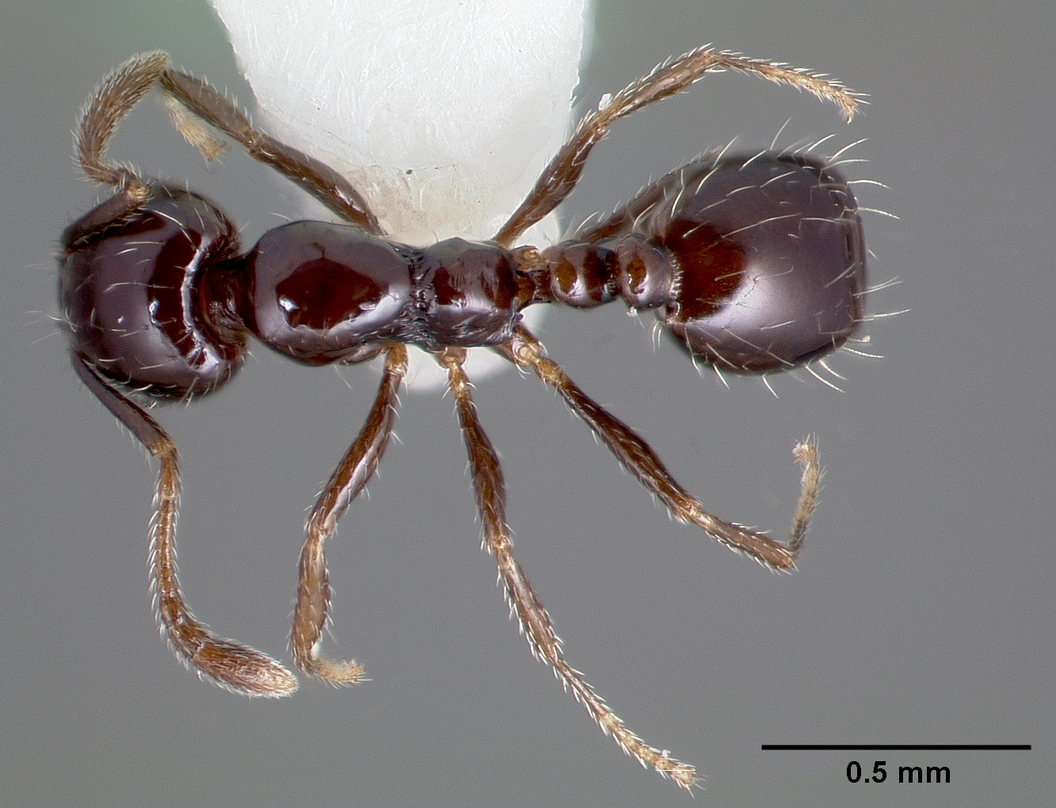

Scientific classification
- Domain: Eukaryota
- Kingdom: Animalia
- Phylum: Arthropoda
- Class: Insecta
- Order: Hymenoptera
- Family: Formicidae
- Subfamily: Myrmicinae
- Genus: Monomorium
- Species: M. ergatogyna

Binomial name
- Monomorium ergatogyna Wheeler, 1904

= Monomorium ergatogyna =

Species of ant

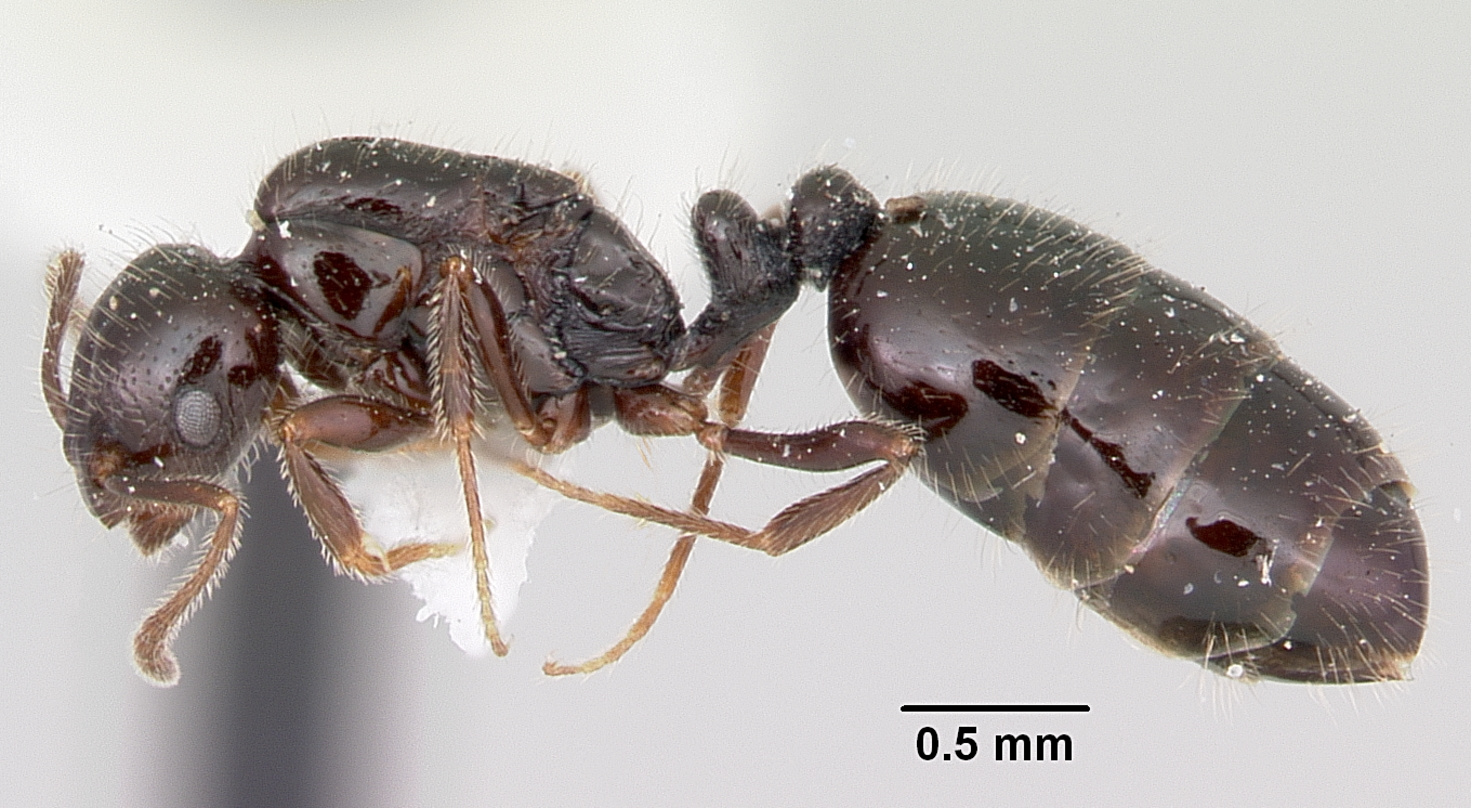
A Monomorium ergatogyna queen, a colony would have multiple of these individuals which lay eggs for the colony.

Monomorium ergatogyna is a species of myrmicine ant. This ant is a shiny black color and contains only a single worker caste, making them a monomorphic species. It is also polygynous, meaning a colony contains multiple fertile queens living together. They are native to California, Nevada, and Utah, and are usually found in cities or on the coast (in California also being found on islands near the coast). When compared to other Monomorium species, they are found to have the longest living queens and can live up 2 years in captivity. M. ergatogyna is often mistaken for Monomorium carbonarium as they are similar in appearance. Argentine ants (Linepithema humile) have been discovered to be actively pushing this species out of its original territory.

Some speculation as to the difference between the island species and the coastal mainland species in California has been brought up. A few argue that the mainland species are not actually "true" ergatogyna but a different species or subspecies, they point to the size difference of island queens and mainland queens. Another point is that mainland species appear to be allopatric, but more evidence must be brought forward to prove this point.

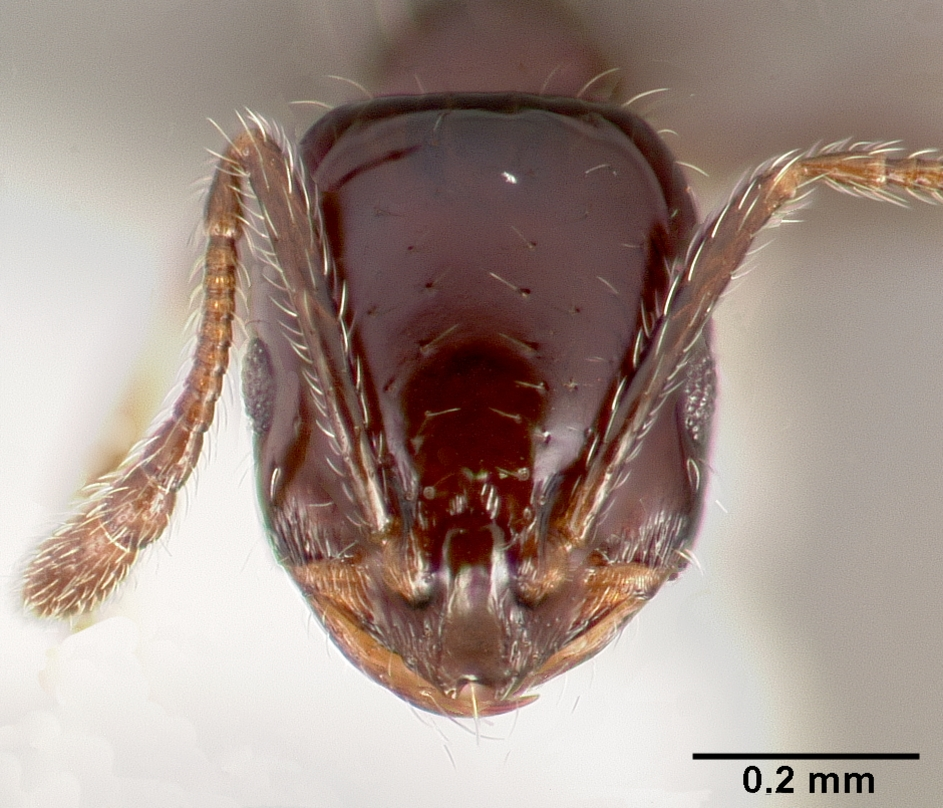

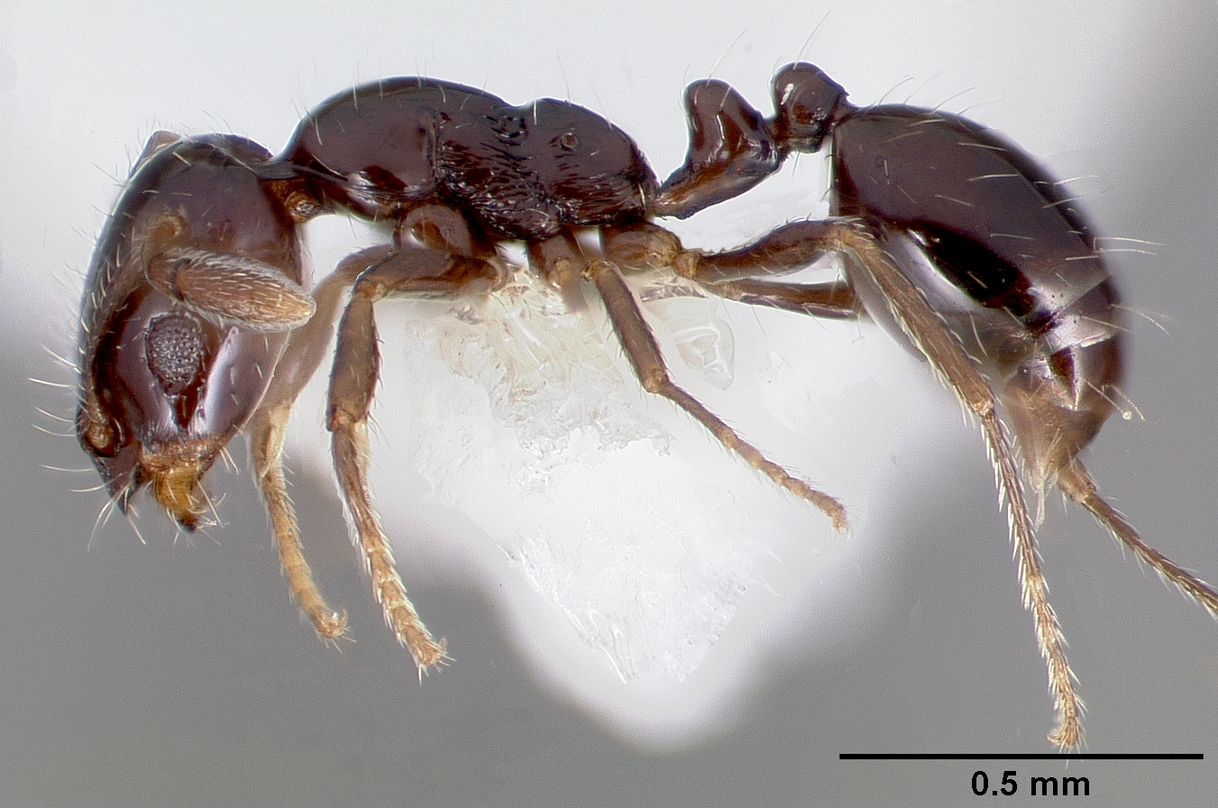
