= Monomorine I =

Names
- Preferred IUPAC name (3R,5S,8aS)-3-Butyl-5-methyloctahydroindolizine
- Other names 5-Methyl-3-butyloctahydroindolizine

Identifiers
| CAS Number | 53447-44-2 |
| 3D model (JSmol) | Interactive image |
| ChemSpider | 161465 |
| PubChem CID | 185741 |
| UNII | 8EBV7G2L35 |
| CompTox Dashboard (EPA) | DTXSID50968121 |
- InChI: InChI=1S/C13H25N/c1-3-4-7-12-9-10-13-8-5-6-11(2)14(12)13/h11-13H,3-10H2,1-2H3/t11-,12+,13-/m0/s1 Key: HFUFMWLNHRIKMV-XQQFMLRXSA-N; InChI=1/C13H25N/c1-3-4-7-12-9-10-13-8-5-6-11(2)14(12)13/h11-13H,3-10H2,1-2H3/t11-,12+,13-/m0/s1 Key: HFUFMWLNHRIKMV-XQQFMLRXBR
- SMILES: CCCC[C@@H]1CC[C@H]2N1[C@H](CCC2)C

Properties
| Chemical formula | C_{13}H_{25}N |
| Molar mass | 195.350 g·mol^{−1} |
- Except where otherwise noted, data are given for materials in their standard state (at 25 °C [77 °F], 100 kPa). Infobox references

Monomorine I is a bicyclic amine that is the trail pheromone of Monomorium pharaonis. Its structure was first elucidated 1973. Synthetic monomorine might be used to lure ants to their doom.
