= Monomorium santschii =

Conservation status
- Vulnerable (IUCN 2.3)

Scientific classification
- Kingdom: Animalia
- Phylum: Arthropoda
- Class: Insecta
- Order: Hymenoptera
- Family: Formicidae
- Subfamily: Myrmicinae
- Genus: Monomorium
- Species: M. santschii

Binomial name
- Monomorium santschii (Forel, 1905)

Synonyms
- Wheeleriella adulatrix Santschi, 1913; Wheeleriella santschii insidiosa Santschi, 1926; Wheeleriella santschii rufescens Santschi, 1926

Species of ant

Monomorium santschii is a species of ant that is native to Tunisia. The most famous species in the genus Monomorium is the highly invasive pharaoh ant, Monomorium pharaonis.

It is a parasitic ant that has no worker caste. The queen enters the colony of a different species and, probably by employing a pheromone, she forces the host workers to kill their queen. She then uses these workers as slaves to bring up her own offspring.
