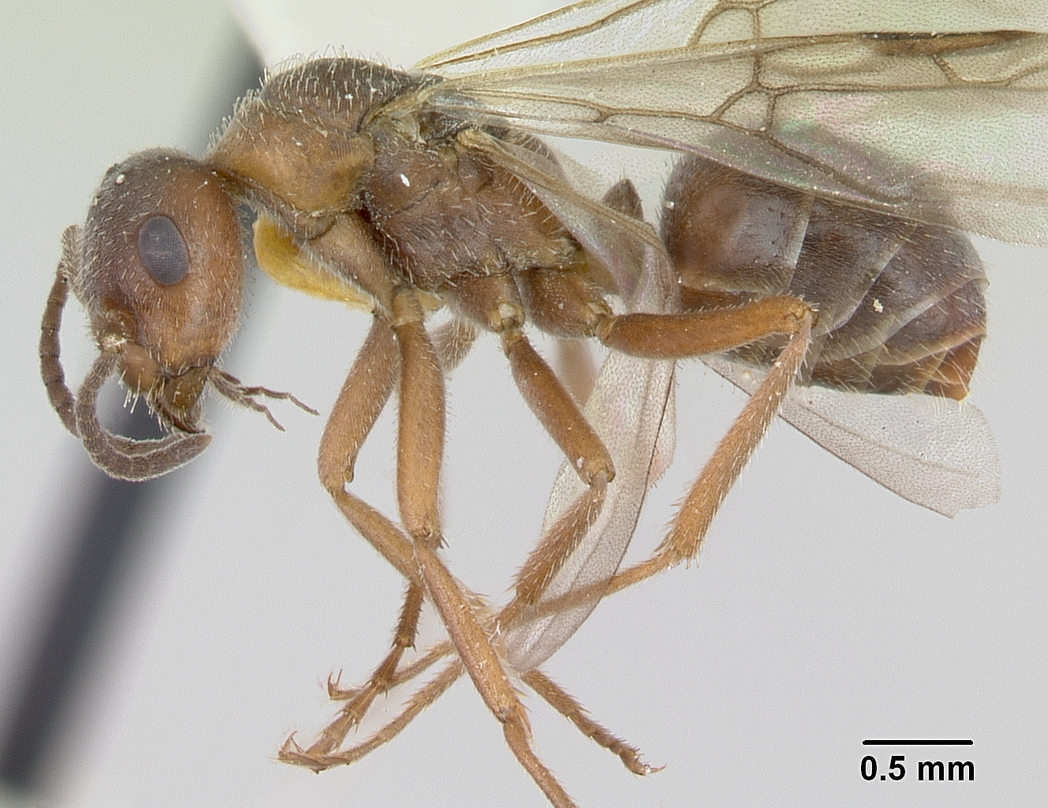
- Formica talbotae alate queen

Conservation status
- Vulnerable (IUCN 2.3)

Scientific classification
- Kingdom: Animalia
- Phylum: Arthropoda
- Class: Insecta
- Order: Hymenoptera
- Family: Formicidae
- Subfamily: Formicinae
- Genus: Formica
- Species: F. talbotae

Binomial name
- Formica talbotae Wilson, 1977

= Formica talbotae =

Species of ant

Formica talbotae is a species of ant in the subfamily Formicinae. It is native to the United States. It is named after entomologist Mary Talbot. It is a species of inquiline workerless parasites that take over nests who have recently lost their queens.
