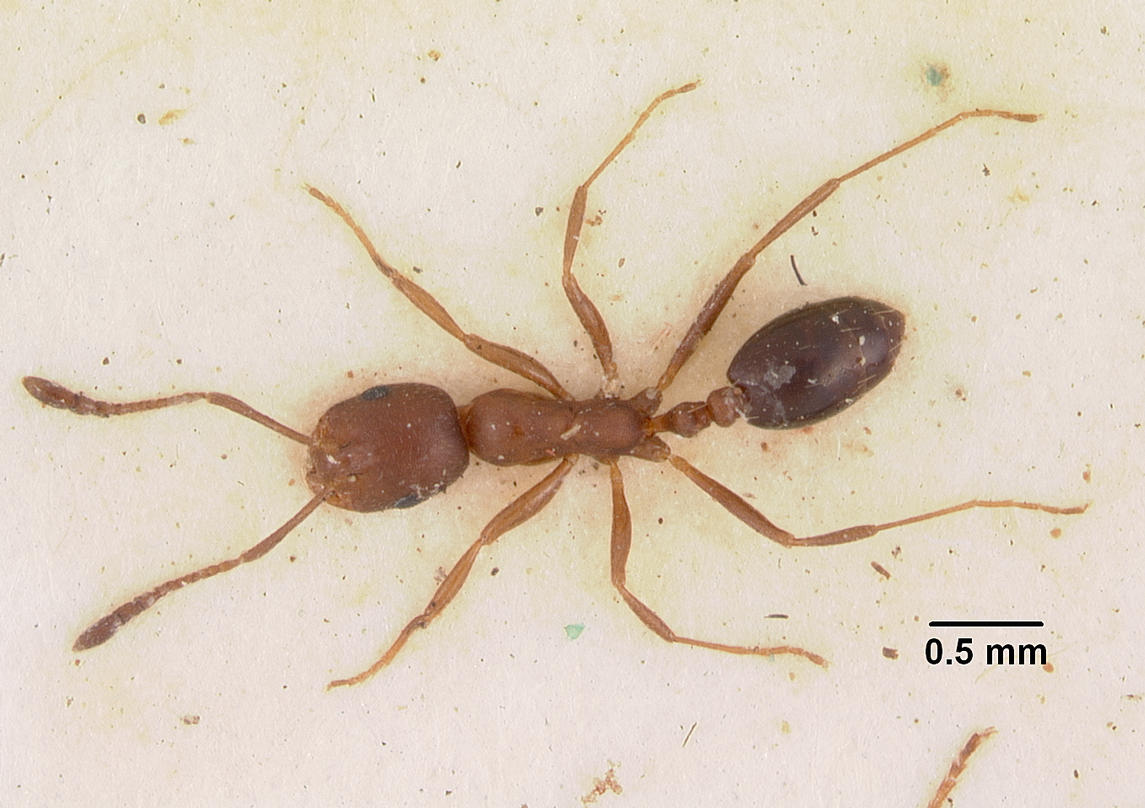

Scientific classification
- Kingdom: Animalia
- Phylum: Arthropoda
- Clade: Pancrustacea
- Class: Insecta
- Order: Hymenoptera
- Family: Formicidae
- Subfamily: Myrmicinae
- Genus: Monomorium
- Species: M. subopacum

Binomial name
- Monomorium subopacum (Smith, F., 1858)

Synonyms
- Monomorium mediterraneum Mayr, 1861; Monomorium salomonis intermedium Santschi, 1927; Monomorium salomonis pestiferum Santschi, 1936; Monomorium subopacum adoneum Santschi, 1936; Monomorium subopacum apuleii Santschi, 1927; Monomorium subopacum ebraicum Menozzi, 1933; Monomorium subopacum italica Baroni Urbani, 1964; Monomorium subopacum liberta Santschi, 1927; Myrmica glyciphila Smith, F., 1858; Paraphacota cabrerae Santschi, 1919; Paraphacota cabrerae obscuripes Santschi, 1921; Paraphacota surcoufi Santschi, 1919

= Monomorium subopacum =

Species of ant

Monomorium subopacum, is a species of ant of the subfamily Myrmicinae. It is found in many Asian countries.

== Subspecies ==
- Monomorium subopacum planidorsum Emery, 1915 - Tunisia
- Monomorium subopacum subopacum Smith, F., 1858 - Cape Verde, Niger, Senegal, United Arab Emirates, Madagascar, Sri Lanka, Canary Islands, Georgia, Gibraltar, Greece, Iberian Peninsula, Italy, Lebanon, Malta, Oman, Portugal, Spain, Tunisia.
