= Monomorium taprobanae =

Scientific classification
- Kingdom: Animalia
- Phylum: Arthropoda
- Clade: Pancrustacea
- Class: Insecta
- Order: Hymenoptera
- Family: Formicidae
- Subfamily: Myrmicinae
- Genus: Monomorium
- Species: M. taprobanae

Binomial name
- Monomorium taprobanae Forel, 1913

Species of ant

Monomorium taprobanae is a species of ant of the subfamily Myrmicinae. It is found in Sri Lanka.
