= Mary Talbot (entomologist) =

American entomologist

- Talbot in the 1960s
- Born: November 30, 1903; Columbus, Ohio
- Died: April 16, 1990 (aged 86); Farmington, Missouri
- Scientific career
- Fields: Entomology
- Institutions: University of Michigan

Mary Talbot (November 30, 1903 – April 16, 1990) was an American entomologist and zoologist known for her studies of the ecology and behavior of ants. She was a Professor and Chair of Biology at Lindenwood College. She completed her PhD at the University of Chicago under Alfred E. Emerson and studied ants for more than fifty years, predominantly in the Edwin S. George Reserve at the University of Michigan.

Talbot produced dozens of papers about her work on ants that laid the foundation for research exploring important questions in population and community ecology, behavior, and natural history. She identified 90 species of ants in Chicago. In 1951, she started a 26-year research project to study and document populations of ants within the Edwin S. George Reserve. She is commemorated in the scientific names of the ant species Formica talbotae and Monomorium talbotae.
