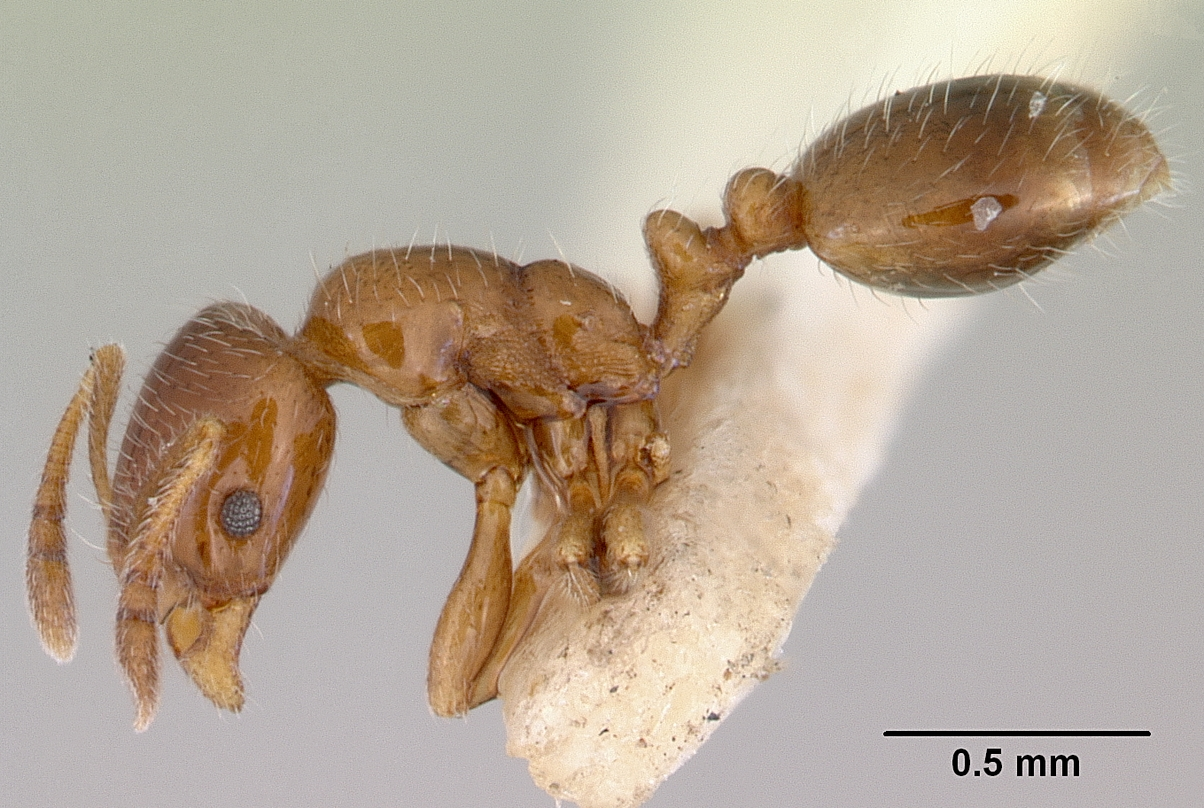
- Monomorium smithi worker

Scientific classification
- Kingdom: Animalia
- Phylum: Arthropoda
- Clade: Pancrustacea
- Class: Insecta
- Order: Hymenoptera
- Family: Formicidae
- Subfamily: Myrmicinae
- Genus: Monomorium
- Species: M. smithi

Binomial name
- Monomorium smithi Forel, 1892

= Monomorium smithi =

Species of ant

Monomorium smithi is an ant of the family Formicidae, endemic to New Zealand.
