= Monomorium consternens =

Scientific classification
- Kingdom: Animalia
- Phylum: Arthropoda
- Clade: Pancrustacea
- Class: Insecta
- Order: Hymenoptera
- Family: Formicidae
- Subfamily: Myrmicinae
- Genus: Monomorium
- Species: M. consternens

Binomial name
- Monomorium consternens (Walker, 1859)

Species of ant

Monomorium consternens, is a species of ant of the subfamily Myrmicinae.
