= Monomorium dentatum =

Scientific classification
- Domain: Eukaryota
- Kingdom: Animalia
- Phylum: Arthropoda
- Class: Insecta
- Order: Hymenoptera
- Family: Formicidae
- Subfamily: Myrmicinae
- Genus: Monomorium
- Species: M. dentatum

Binomial name
- Monomorium dentatum Sharaf, M. R., 2007

Species of ant

Monomorium dentatum is an ant species which has been discovered on August 20, 2003, by M. R. Sharaf in Egypt and described by Sharaf, M. R. in 2007.
