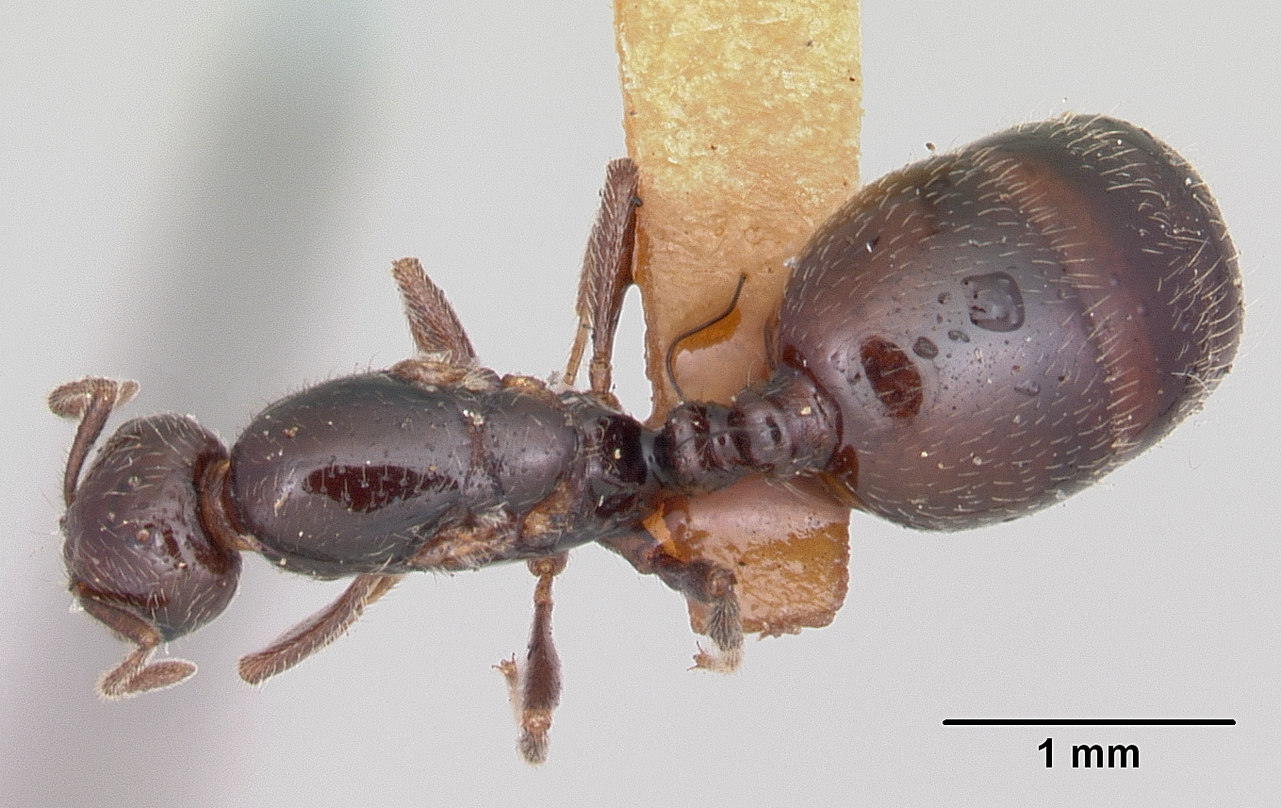

Scientific classification
- Domain: Eukaryota
- Kingdom: Animalia
- Phylum: Arthropoda
- Class: Insecta
- Order: Hymenoptera
- Family: Formicidae
- Subfamily: Myrmicinae
- Tribe: Solenopsidini
- Genus: Monomorium
- Species: M. emarginatum

Binomial name
- Monomorium emarginatum DuBois, 1986

= Monomorium emarginatum =

Species of ant

Monomorium emarginatum is a species of ant in the family Formicidae.

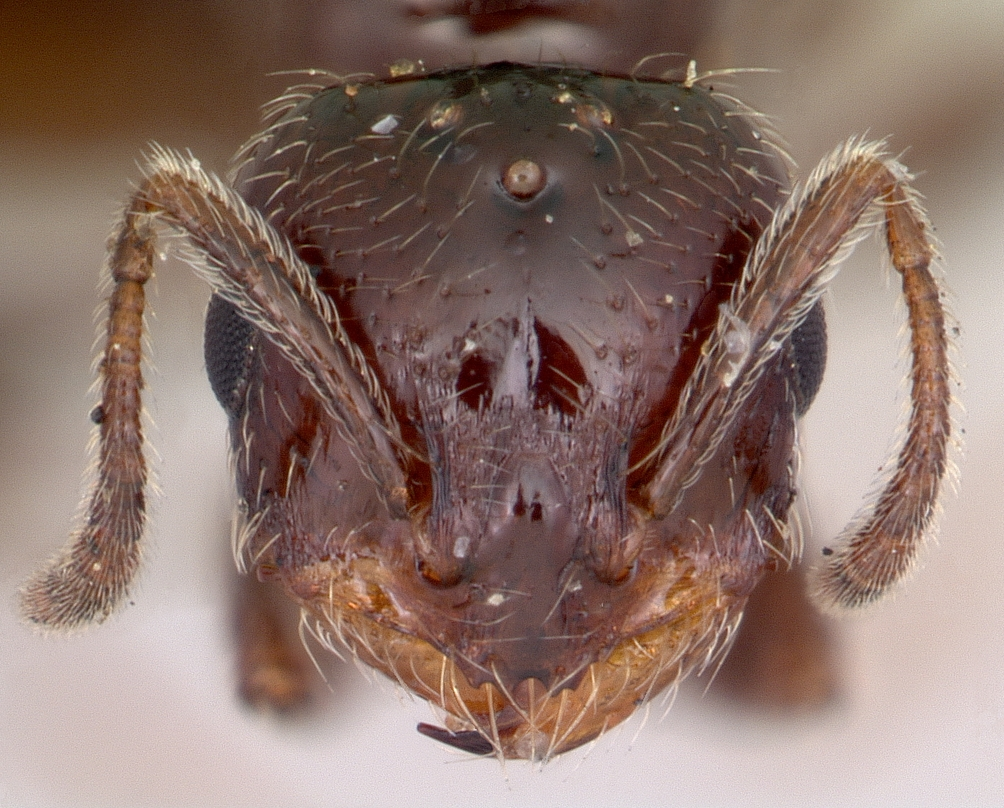

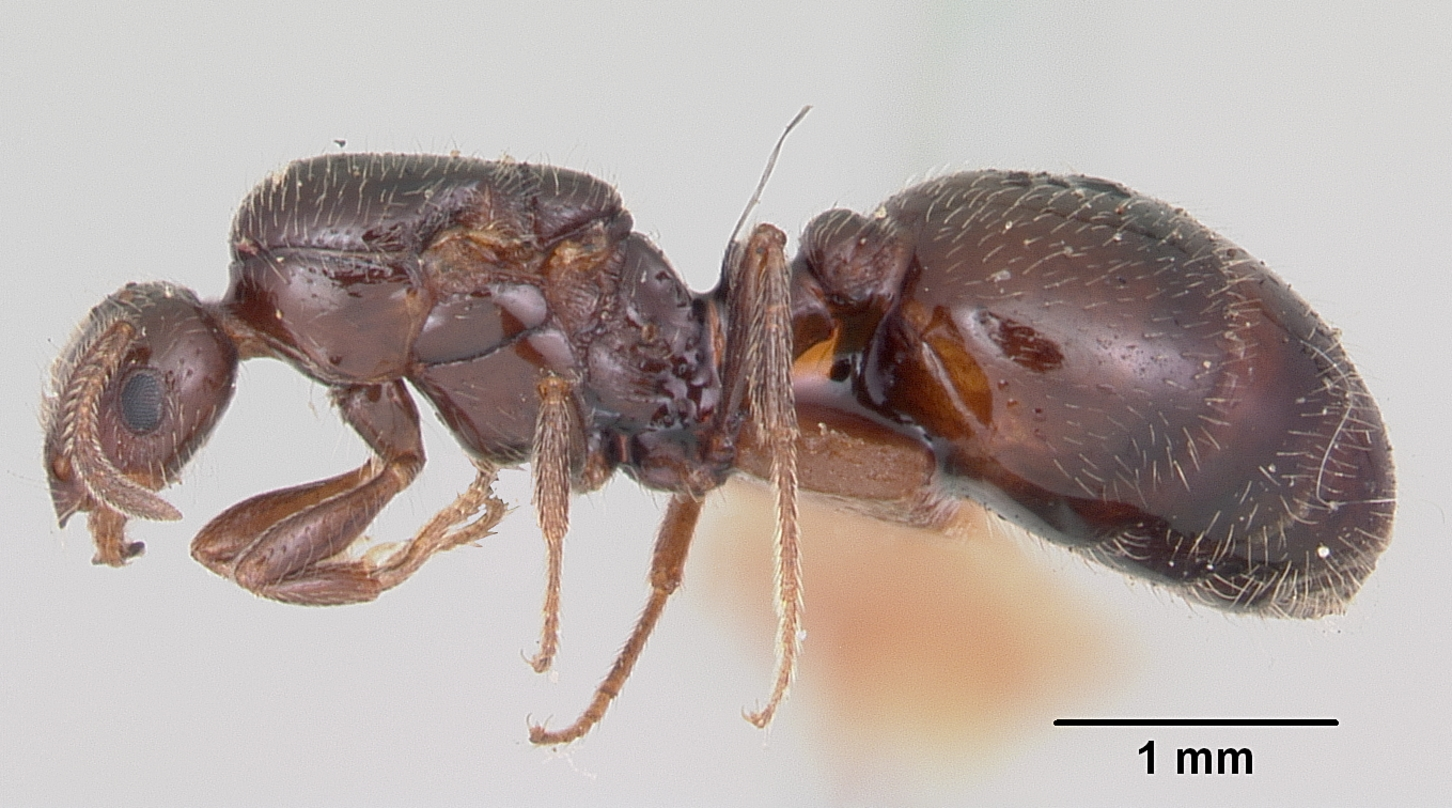
