= Monomorium denticulatum =

Scientific classification
- Domain: Eukaryota
- Kingdom: Animalia
- Phylum: Arthropoda
- Class: Insecta
- Order: Hymenoptera
- Family: Formicidae
- Subfamily: Myrmicinae
- Genus: Monomorium
- Species: M. denticulatum

Binomial name
- Monomorium denticulatum Mayr, 1887

Synonyms
- Notomyrmex denticulatum Nothidris denticulatus Antichthonidris denticulatus Antichthonidris denticulata

Species of ant

Monomorium denticulatum is a species of ant in the subfamily Myrmicinae. It known from Chile and Argentina. Like M. bidentatum it was first described from Valdivia, Chile.

== Description ==
Workers are 3 mm long, yellowish red, with brown head, petiole and abdomen. Females are 4 mm long and brownish black, with only the most distal tarsal elements and the tip of the abdomen reddish yellow.
