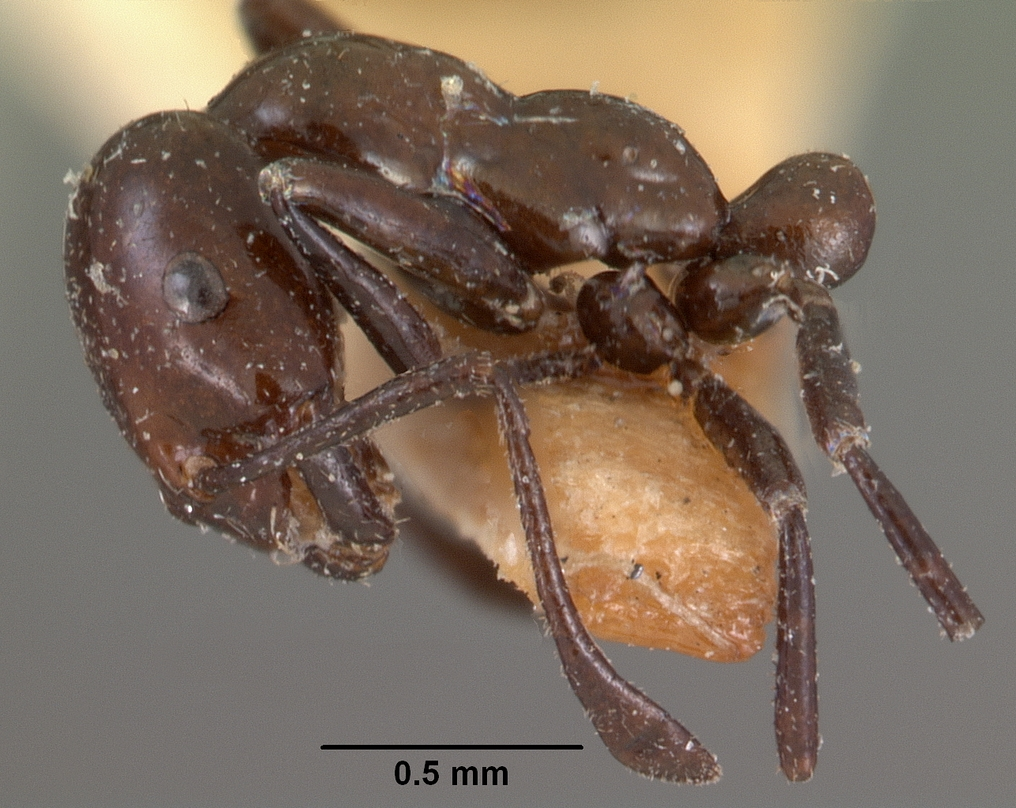

Conservation status
- Vulnerable (IUCN 2.3)

Scientific classification
- Kingdom: Animalia
- Phylum: Arthropoda
- Clade: Pancrustacea
- Class: Insecta
- Order: Hymenoptera
- Family: Formicidae
- Subfamily: Myrmicinae
- Genus: Monomorium
- Species: M. noualhieri

Binomial name
- Monomorium noualhieri (Emery, 1895)

Synonyms
- Monomorirm noualhieri (Emery, 1895) [orth. error]

= Monomorium noualhieri =

Species of ant

Monomorium noualhieri is a species of ant endemic to Algeria.
