= Astragalus bidentatus =

Conservation status
- Endangered (IUCN 3.1)

Scientific classification
- Kingdom: Plantae
- Clade: Tracheophytes
- Clade: Angiosperms
- Clade: Eudicots
- Clade: Rosids
- Order: Fabales
- Family: Fabaceae
- Subfamily: Faboideae
- Genus: Astragalus
- Species: A. bidentatus

Binomial name
- Astragalus bidentatus Kunth

Species of plant

Astragalus bidentatus is a species of plant in the family Fabaceae. It is found only in Ecuador in two locations in the south above the timberline in the Azuay and Cañar provinces. Its natural habitat is subtropical or tropical high-elevation grassland. No specimens have been taken since 1945 and none are contained in museums. It is most commonly found in the month of July.
