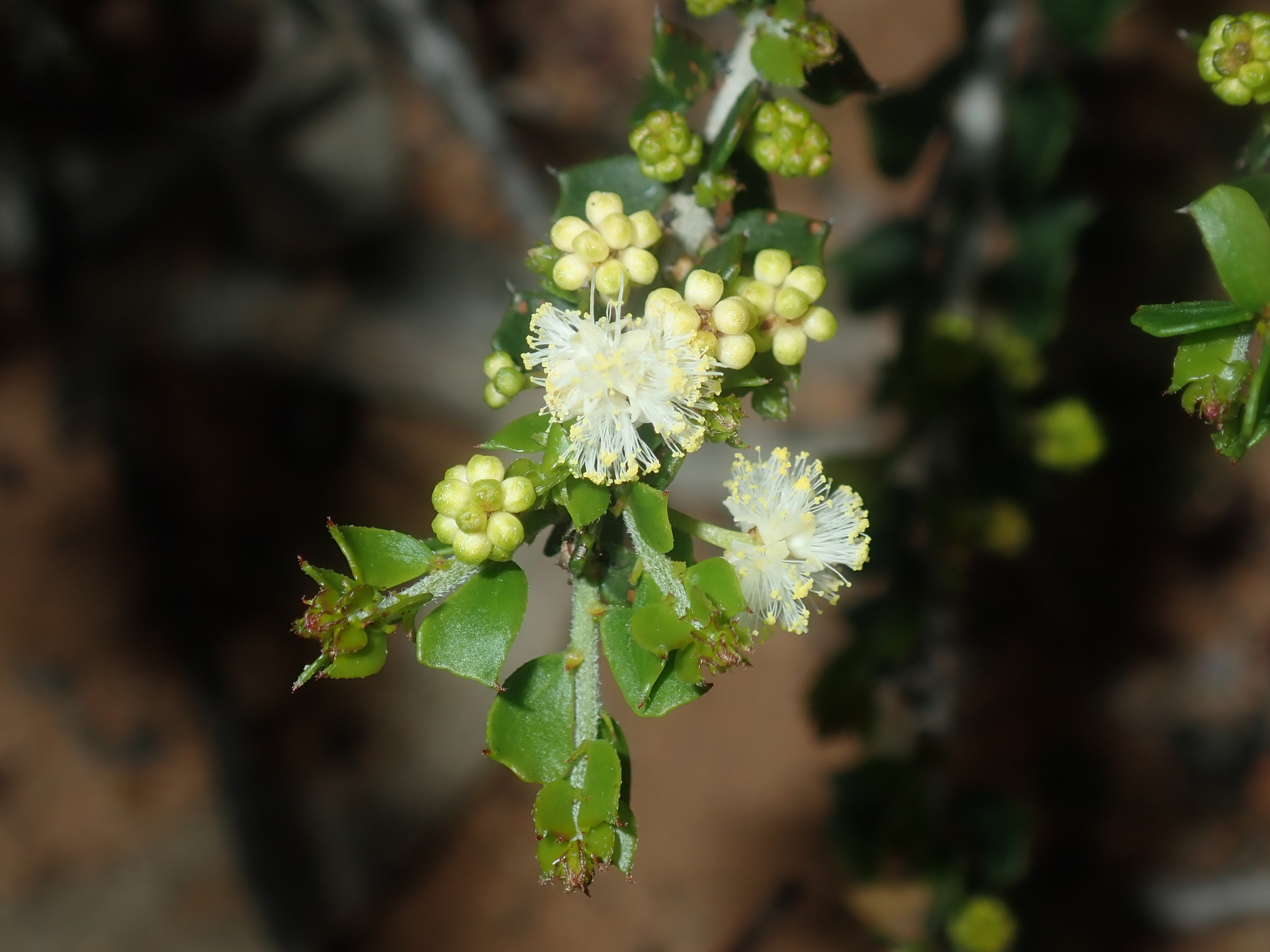

Scientific classification
- Kingdom: Plantae
- Clade: Embryophytes
- Clade: Tracheophytes
- Clade: Spermatophytes
- Clade: Angiosperms
- Clade: Eudicots
- Clade: Rosids
- Order: Fabales
- Family: Fabaceae
- Subfamily: Caesalpinioideae
- Clade: Mimosoid clade
- Genus: Acacia
- Species: A. bidentata

Binomial name
- Acacia bidentata Benth.
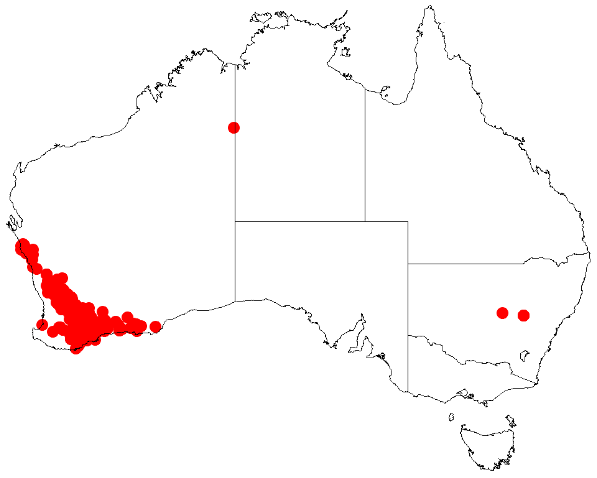
- Occurrence data from AVH

Synonyms
- Acacia bidentata Benth. f. bidentata; Acacia bidentata f. typica E.Pritz. nom. inval.; Acacia bidentata Benth. var. bidentata; Acacia bidentata var. pubescens Meisn.; Racosperma bidentatum (Benth.) Pedley

= Acacia bidentata =

Species of shrub endemic to Western Australia

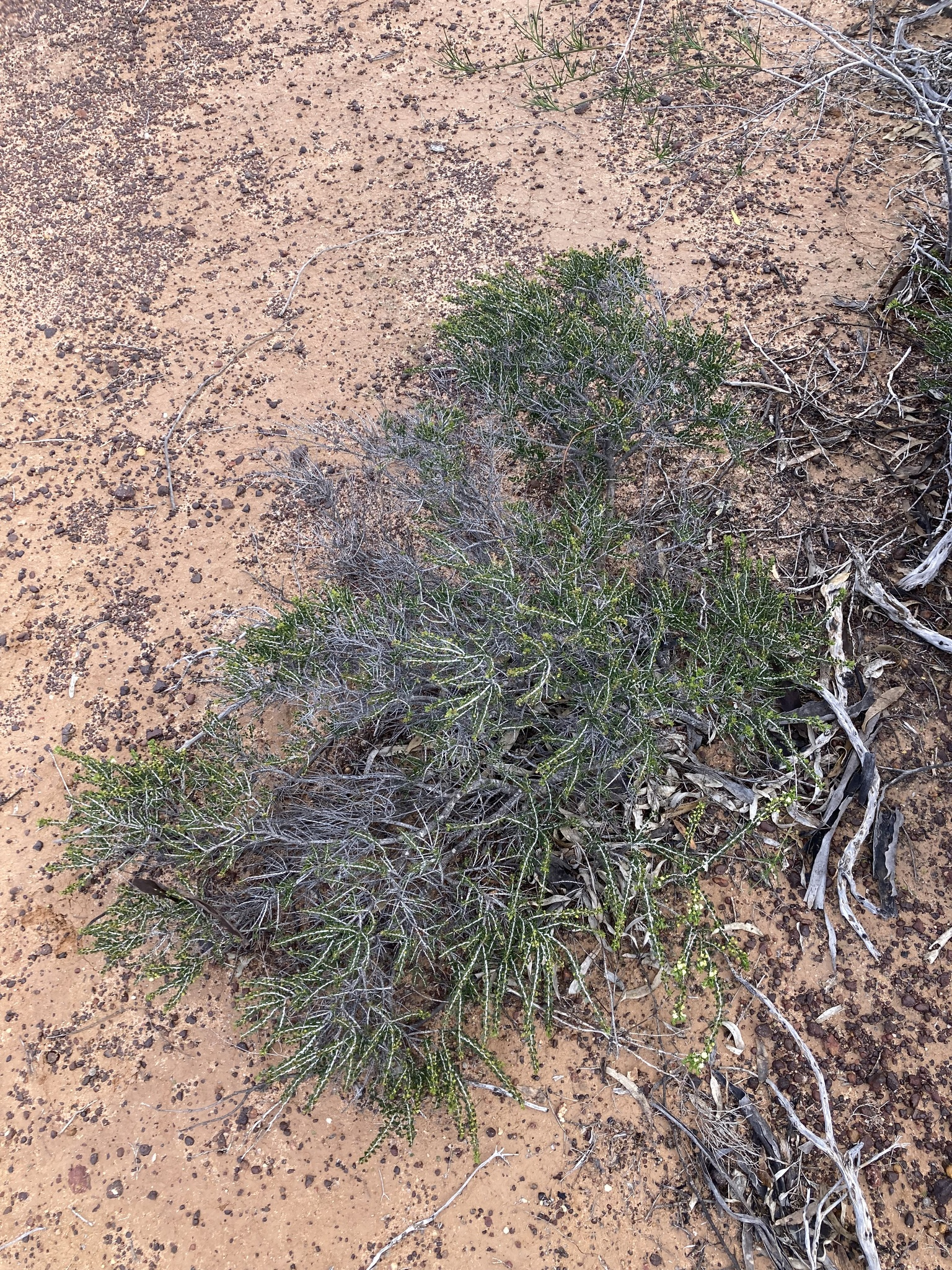
Habit in Kalbarri National Park

Acacia bidentata is a species of flowering plant in the family Fabaceae and is endemic to the south-west of Western Australia. It is a prostrate or domed shrub with egg-shaped or triangular phyllodes with the narrower end towards the base, spherical or oblong heads of creamy-white or pale yellow flowers, and strongly curved or coiled pods.

== Description ==
Acacia bidentata is a prostrate or domed shrub that typically grows to a height of up to 50 cm (20 in) and has branchlets with scurfy white hairs. The phyllodes are egg-shaped to triangular with the narrower end towards the base, mostly 4–7 mm (0.16–0.28 in) long and 2.5–5 mm (0.098–0.197 in) wide. The flowers are borne in up to three spherical to oblong heads in axils, on a peduncle 3–10 mm (0.12–0.39 in) long, each head with 10 to 16 creamy white or pale yellow flowers. Flowering occurs from about July to October and the pods are thinly crust-like, glabrous, strongly curved to coiled, 3–4 mm (0.12–0.16 in) wide containing oblong seeds 3.0–3.5 mm (0.12–0.14 in) long with an aril.

== Taxonomy ==
Acacia bidentata was first formally described in 1842 by the botanist George Bentham in Hooker's London Journal of Botany from specimens collected near the Swan River Colony by James Drummond. The specific epithet (bidentata) means 'two-toothed', referring to the phyllodes.

== Distribution and habitat ==
This species of wattle grows in clay, sand or loam in mallee woodland and mainly occurs from near Winchester, south to the Stirling Range National Park and east to Grass Patch and Condingup, but is also found near Kalbarri, in the Avon Wheatbelt, Coolgardie, Esperance Plains, Geraldton Sandplains, Jarrah Forest and Mallee bioregions of south-western Western Australia.

== Conservation status ==
Acacia bidentata is listed as "not threatened" by the Government of Western Australia Department of Biodiversity, Conservation and Attractions.

== See also ==
- List of Acacia species
