= Monomorium inquilinum =

Conservation status
- Vulnerable (IUCN 2.3)

Scientific classification
- Kingdom: Animalia
- Phylum: Arthropoda
- Class: Insecta
- Order: Hymenoptera
- Family: Formicidae
- Subfamily: Myrmicinae
- Genus: Monomorium
- Species: M. inquilinum

Binomial name
- Monomorium inquilinum DuBois, 1981

Species of ant

Monomorium inquilinum is a species of ant in the genus Monomorium. It is native to Mexico.
