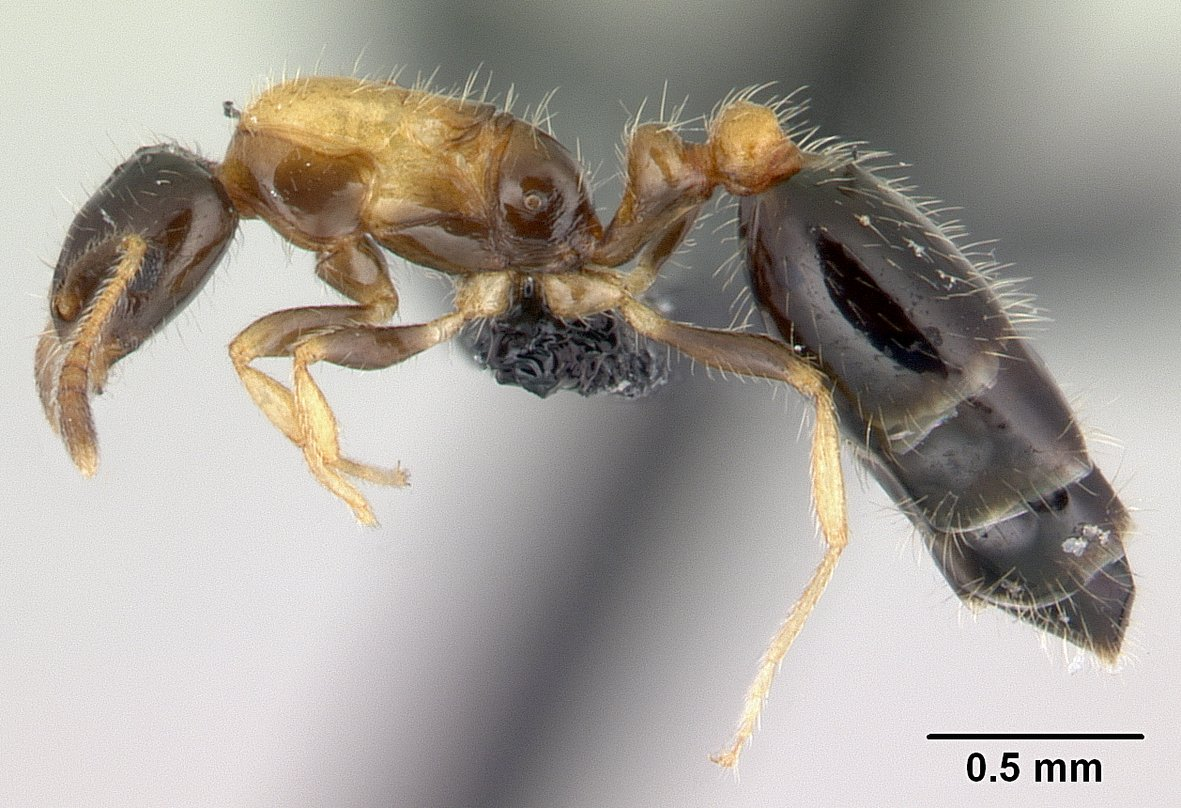

Scientific classification
- Kingdom: Animalia
- Phylum: Arthropoda
- Clade: Pancrustacea
- Class: Insecta
- Order: Hymenoptera
- Family: Formicidae
- Subfamily: Myrmicinae
- Genus: Monomorium
- Species: M. floricola

Binomial name
- Monomorium floricola (Jerdon, 1851)

Synonyms
- Monomorium angusticlava Donisthorpe, 1947; Monomorium cinnabari Roger, 1863; Monomorium floreanum Stitz, 1932; Monomorium floricola furina Forel, 1911; Monomorium floricola philippinensis Forel, 1910; Monomorium impressum Smith, F., 1876; Monomorium poecilum Roger, 1863; Monomorium specularis Mayr, 1866

= Monomorium floricola =

Bicolored trailing ant

Species of ant

The bicolored trailing ant or flower ant (Monomorium floricola) is a species of ant of the subfamily Myrmicinae. It is a widespread, invasive ant which is found all over the world.

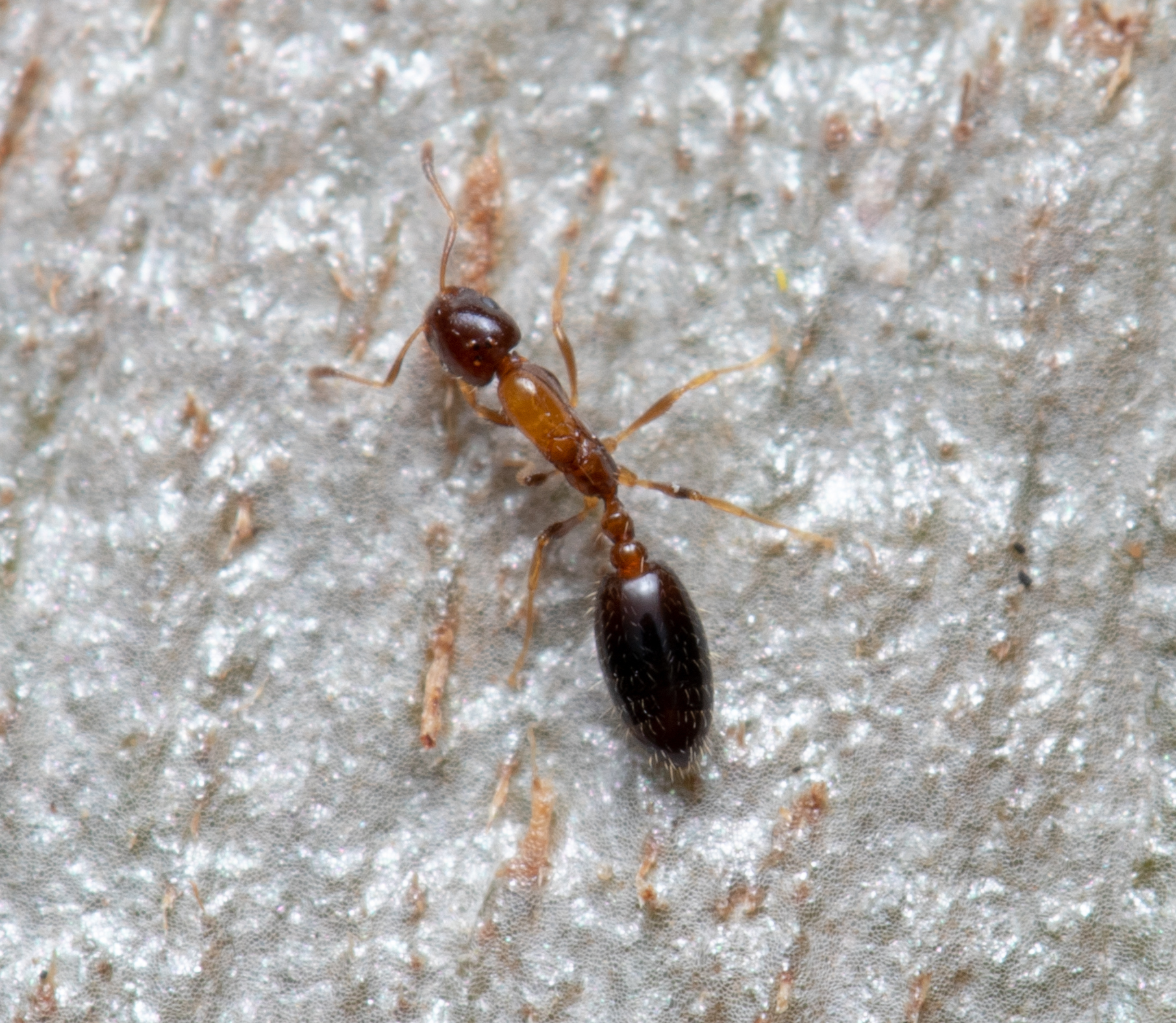
M. floricola queen from Australia

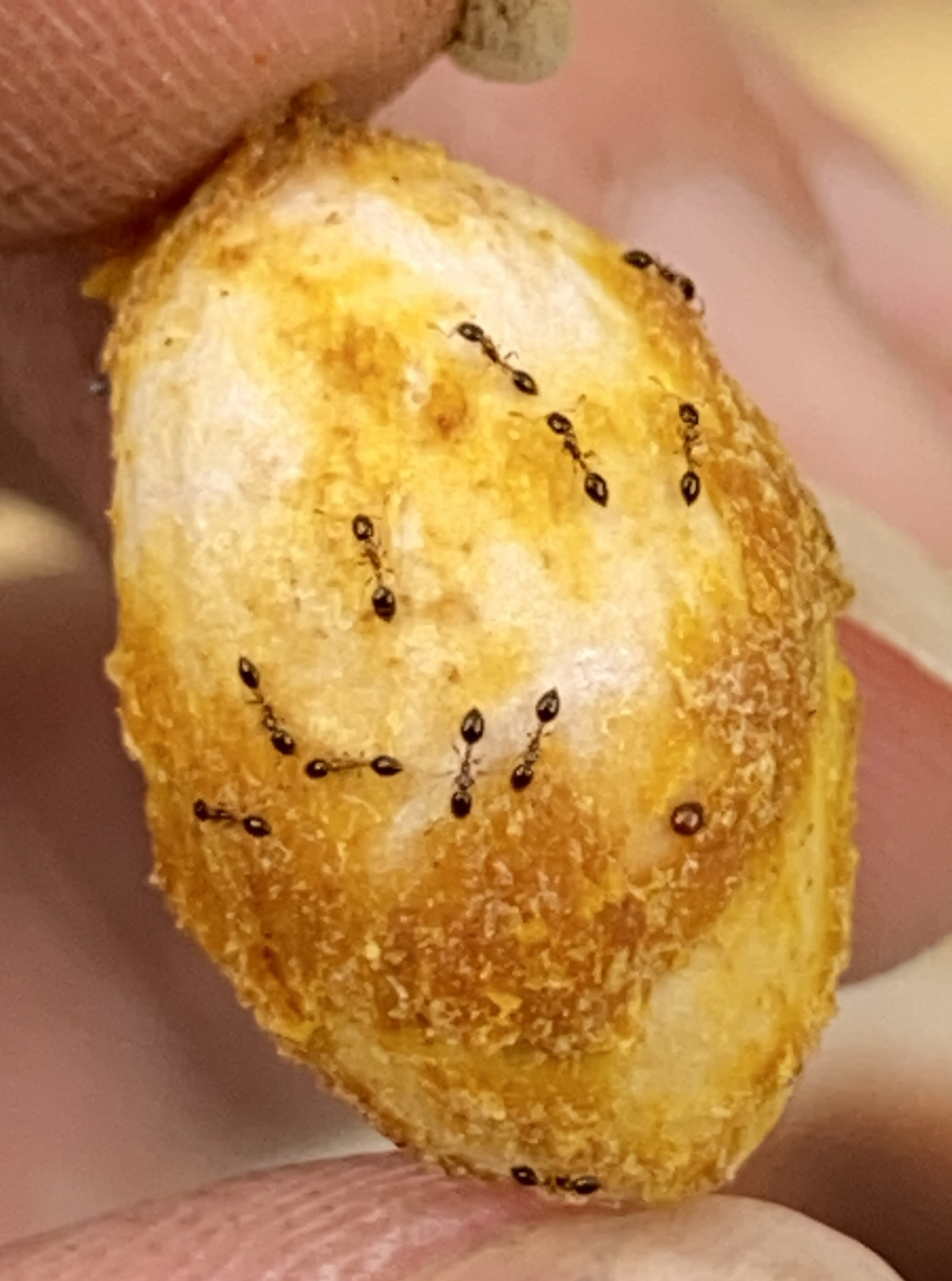
M. floricola from Hawai'i

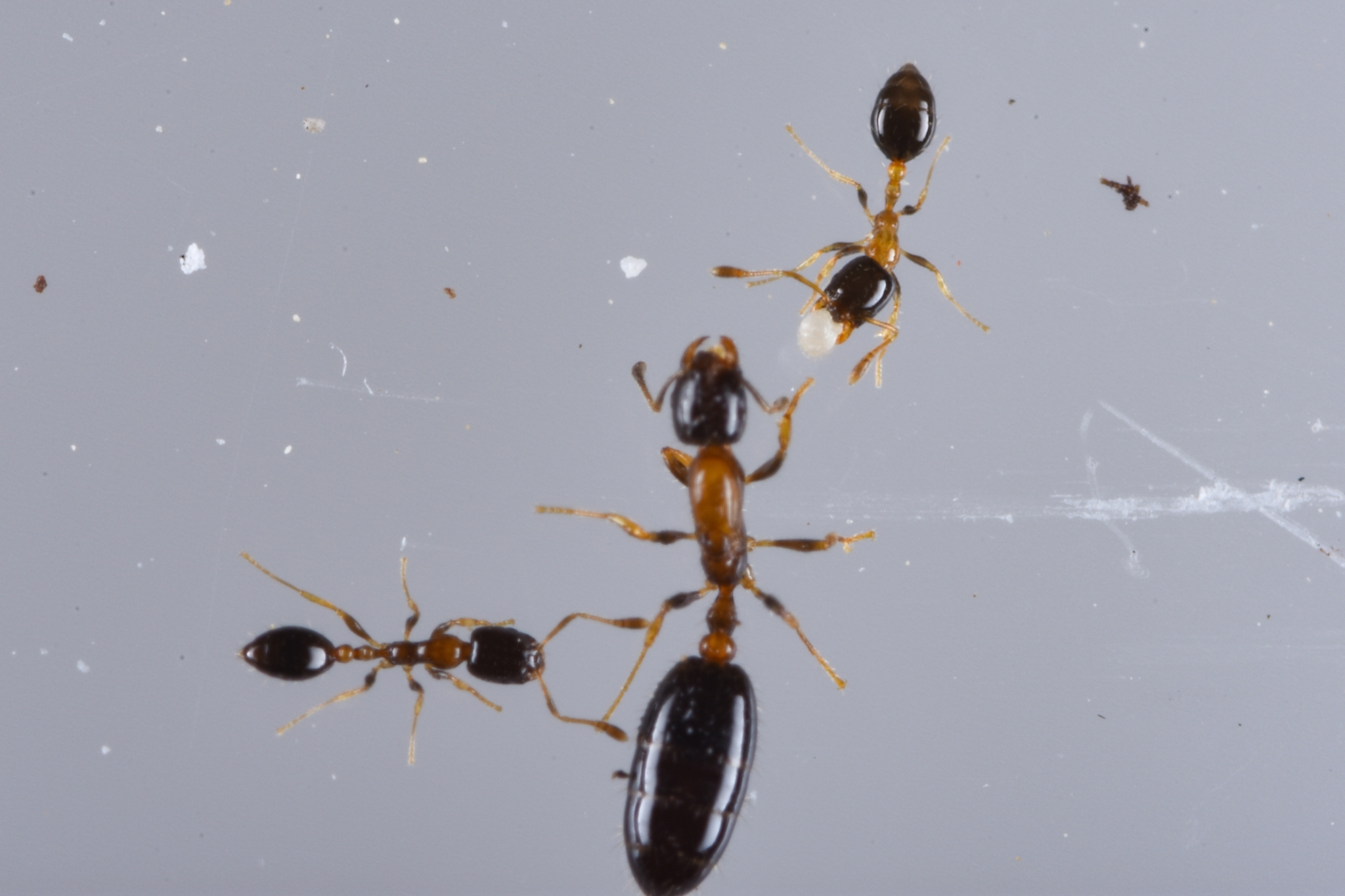
workers with queen from Japan
