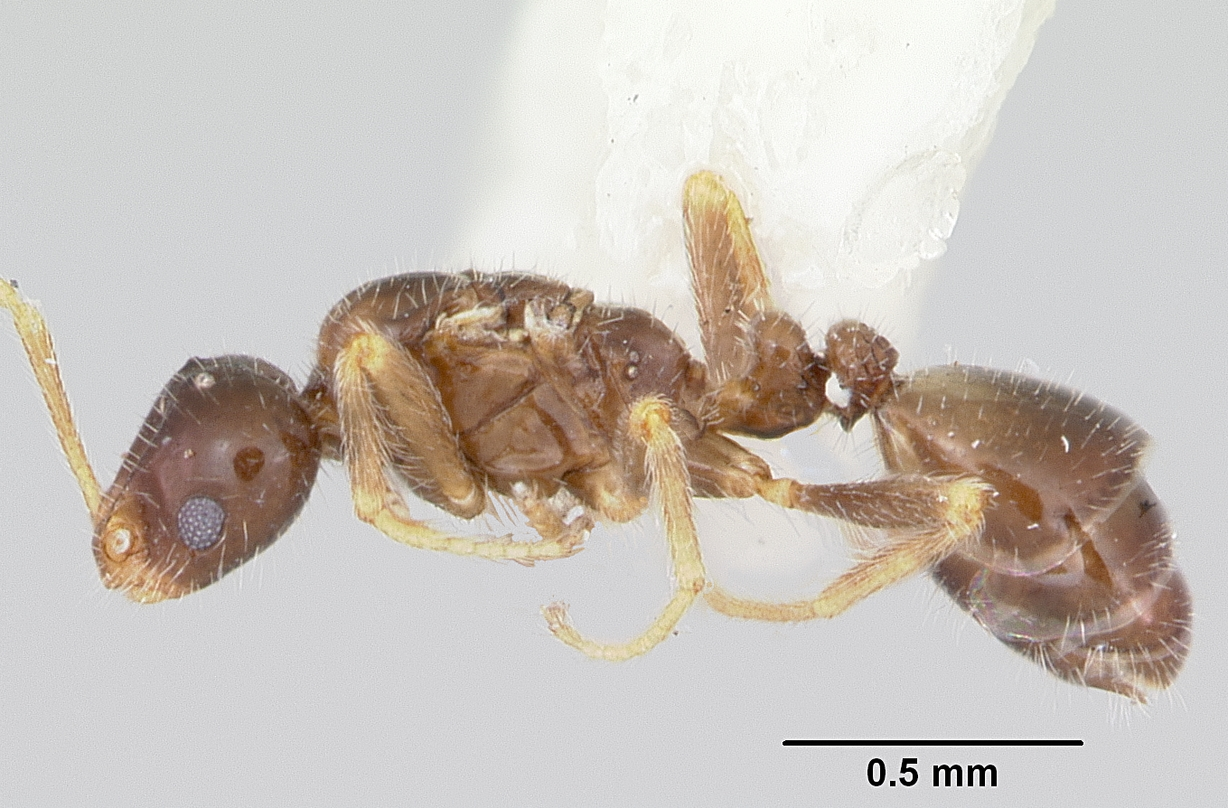
- Monomorium talbotae dealate queen

Conservation status
- Vulnerable (IUCN 2.3)

Scientific classification
- Kingdom: Animalia
- Phylum: Arthropoda
- Class: Insecta
- Order: Hymenoptera
- Family: Formicidae
- Subfamily: Myrmicinae
- Genus: Monomorium
- Species: M. talbotae

Binomial name
- Monomorium talbotae DuBois, 1981

= Monomorium talbotae =

Species of ant

Monomorium talbotae is a species of ant in the genus Monomorium. It is native to the United States. It is named after entomologist Mary Talbot.
