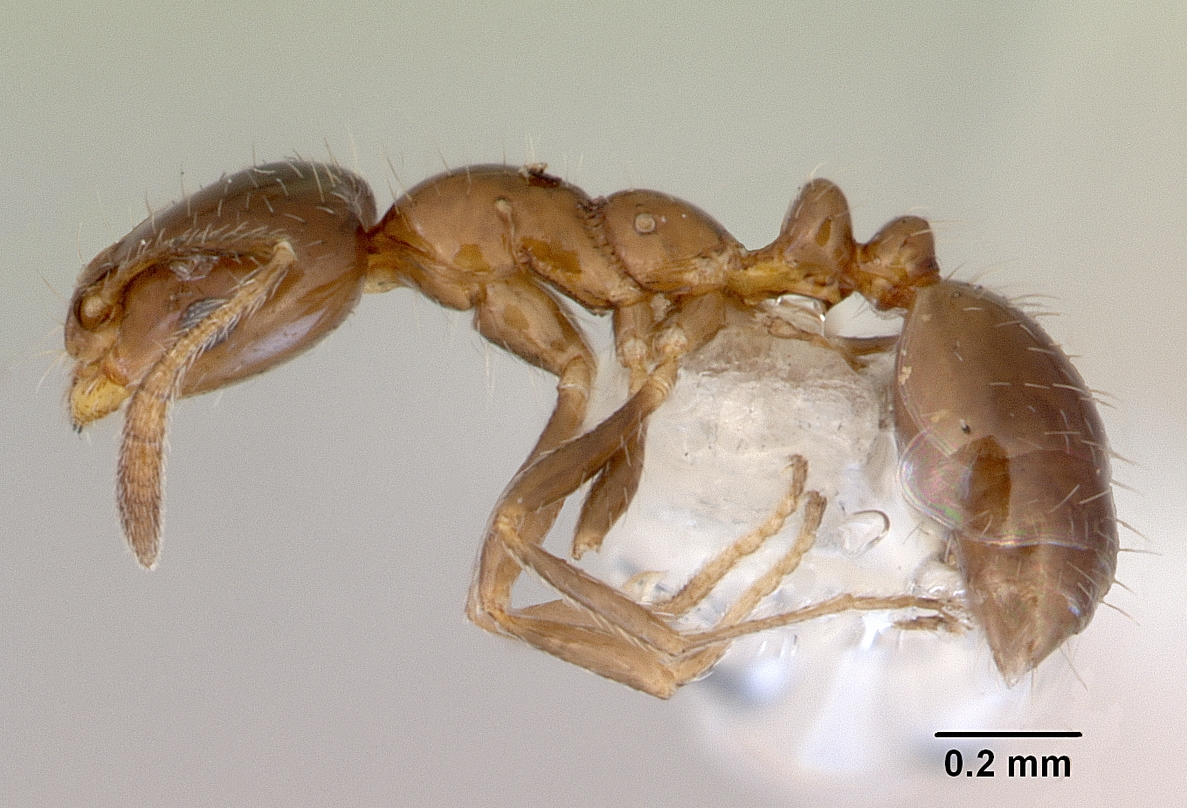

Scientific classification
- Kingdom: Animalia
- Phylum: Arthropoda
- Clade: Pancrustacea
- Class: Insecta
- Order: Hymenoptera
- Family: Formicidae
- Subfamily: Myrmicinae
- Genus: Monomorium
- Species: M. fieldi

Binomial name
- Monomorium fieldi Forel, 1910

Synonyms
- Monomorium antipodum

= Monomorium fieldi =

Species of ant

Monomorium fieldi is an ant of the family Formicidae, endemic to the North Island and the north of the South Island of New Zealand. It is found in a wide variety of habitats, but is very uncommon in forests.
