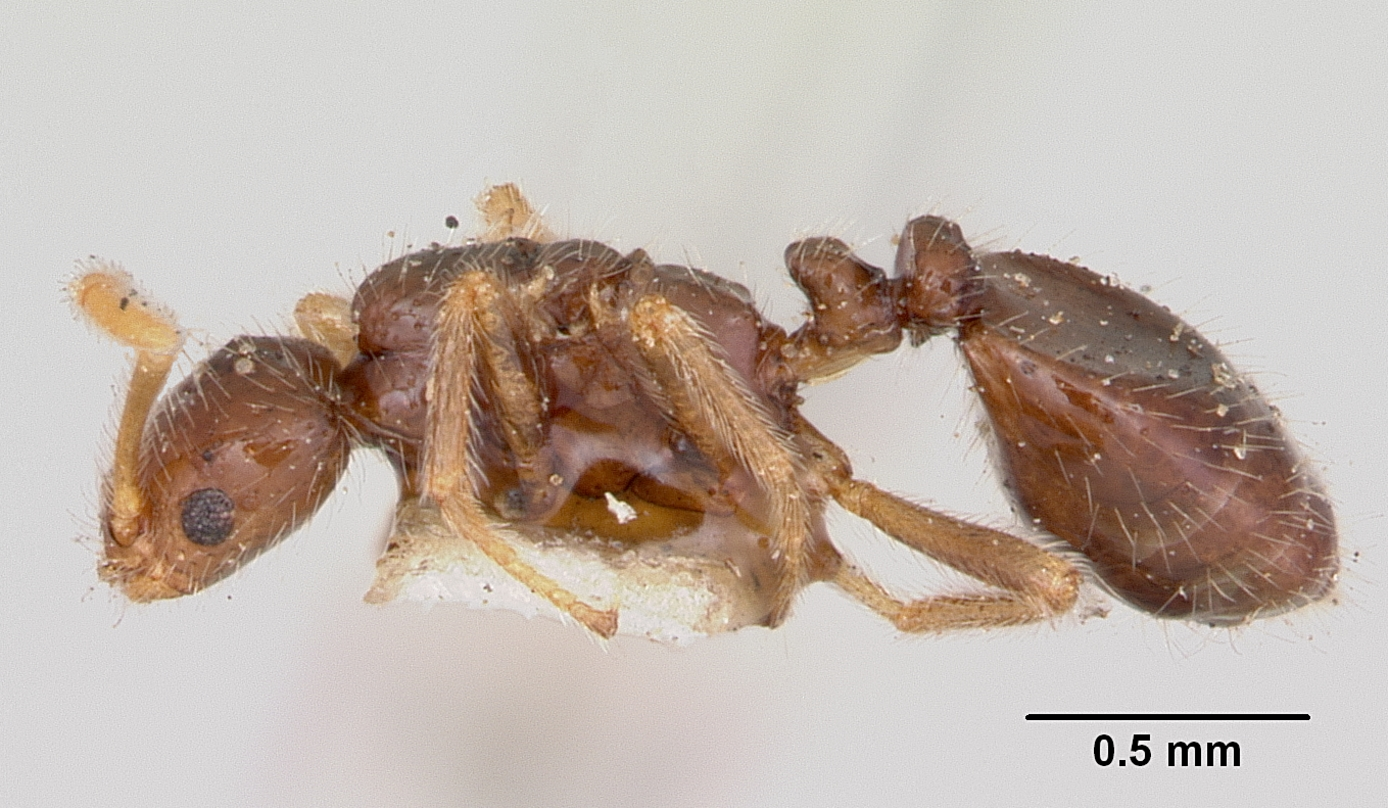
- M. pergandei dealate queen

Conservation status
- Vulnerable (IUCN 2.3)

Scientific classification
- Kingdom: Animalia
- Phylum: Arthropoda
- Class: Insecta
- Order: Hymenoptera
- Family: Formicidae
- Subfamily: Myrmicinae
- Genus: Monomorium
- Species: M. pergandei

Binomial name
- Monomorium pergandei (Emery, 1893)

= Monomorium pergandei =

Species of ant

Monomorium pergandei is a species of ant in the genus Monomorium. It is native to the United States. The species is named after the American myrmecologist Theodore Pergande.
