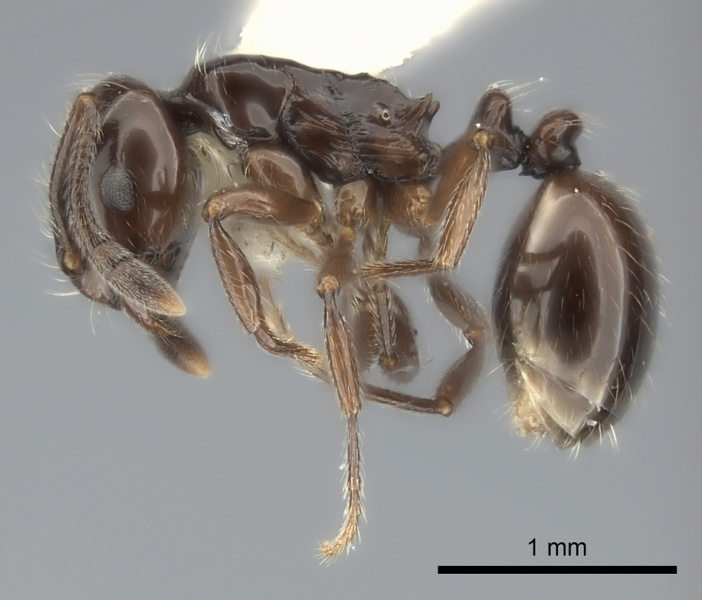
- Monomorium bidentatum worker

Conservation status
- Vulnerable (IUCN 2.3)

Scientific classification
- Kingdom: Animalia
- Phylum: Arthropoda
- Class: Insecta
- Order: Hymenoptera
- Family: Formicidae
- Subfamily: Myrmicinae
- Genus: Monomorium
- Species: M. bidentatum

Binomial name
- Monomorium bidentatum Mayr, 1887

Synonyms
- Notomyrmex bidentatum; Nothidris bidentatus; Antichthonidris bidentatus; Antichthonidris bidentata

= Monomorium bidentatum =

Species of ant

Monomorium bidentatum is a species of ant in the subfamily Myrmicinae. It is endemic to two South American countries, Chile and Argentina.

== Description ==
Workers are around 3.5 millimetres (0.14 in) long. The general color is dark brown, with the mandibles, antennae and legs slightly lighter. Females are almost 4.5 mm (0.18 in) long, but otherwise very similar to workers.

== Distribution ==
M. bidentatum is found in Chile and Argentina. It was first described from Valdivia, Chile.

== Taxonomy ==
The genus Antichthonidris contained only two species, A. bidentata and A. denticulata. Both species were originally described by Gustav Mayr under genus Monomorium. However, Antichthonidris was synonymized with Monomorium in 2001, so that this genus is no longer valid, and the two species are again known under their original name.
