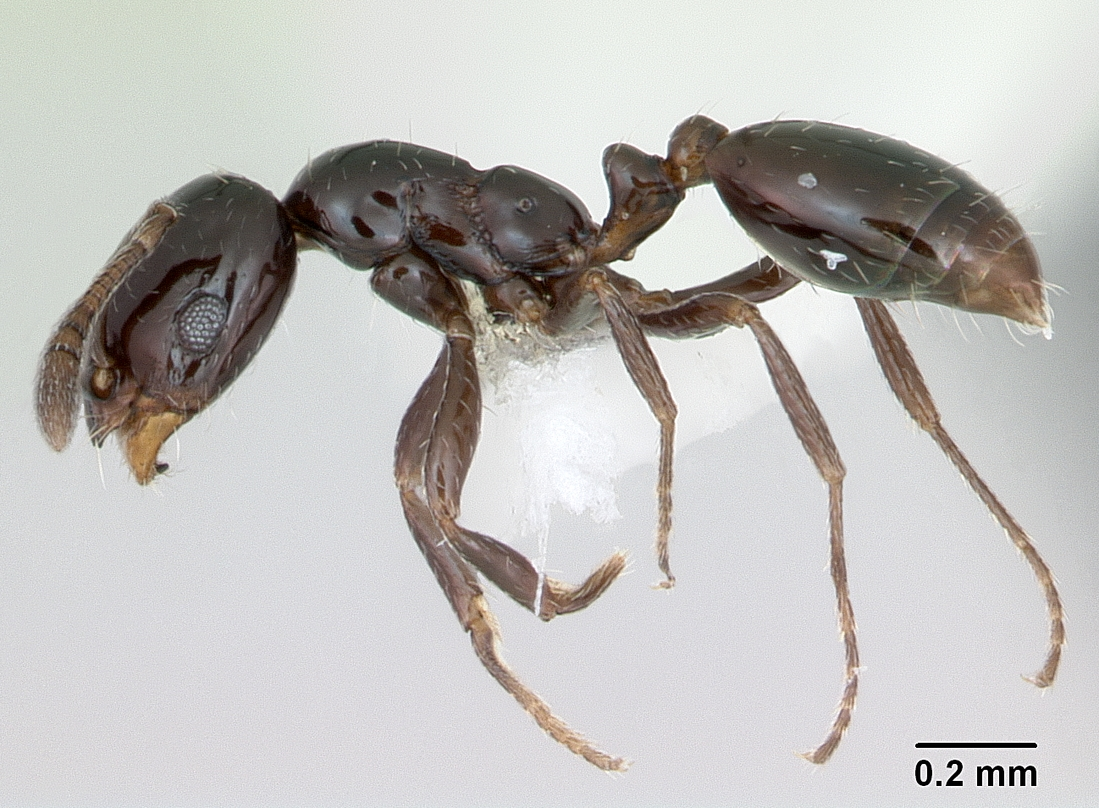

Scientific classification
- Kingdom: Animalia
- Phylum: Arthropoda
- Clade: Pancrustacea
- Class: Insecta
- Order: Hymenoptera
- Family: Formicidae
- Subfamily: Myrmicinae
- Genus: Monomorium
- Species: M. carbonarium

Binomial name
- Monomorium carbonarium (Smith, F., 1858)

= Monomorium carbonarium =

Species of ant

Monomorium carbonarium, also referred to the little black ant in North America, is a species of ant native to North America and Europe. It is a shiny black color, the workers about 1 to 2 mm long and the queens 4 to 5 mm long. It is a monomorphic species, with only one caste of worker, and polygynous, meaning a nest may have more than one queen. A colony is usually moderately sized with only a few thousand workers.

M. carbonarium are scavengers that will consume anything from bird droppings to dead insects. They are predators of codling moth larvae, and also of fall webworm. Workers may forage in households, but nest in soil mounds. They harvest the honeydew of aphids such as the soybean aphid (Aphis glycines).

During mid-summer the queens and males perform the nuptial flight, mating in midair. The males die shortly after. Each queen constructs a new nest, sheds its wings, and lays eggs. The development from egg to adult takes about a month.

In a laboratory setting queens were found to live about one year and workers about four months.

Formerly separate species, Monomorium minimum and Monomorium trageri were synonymized under M. carbonarium by Seifert in 2025.

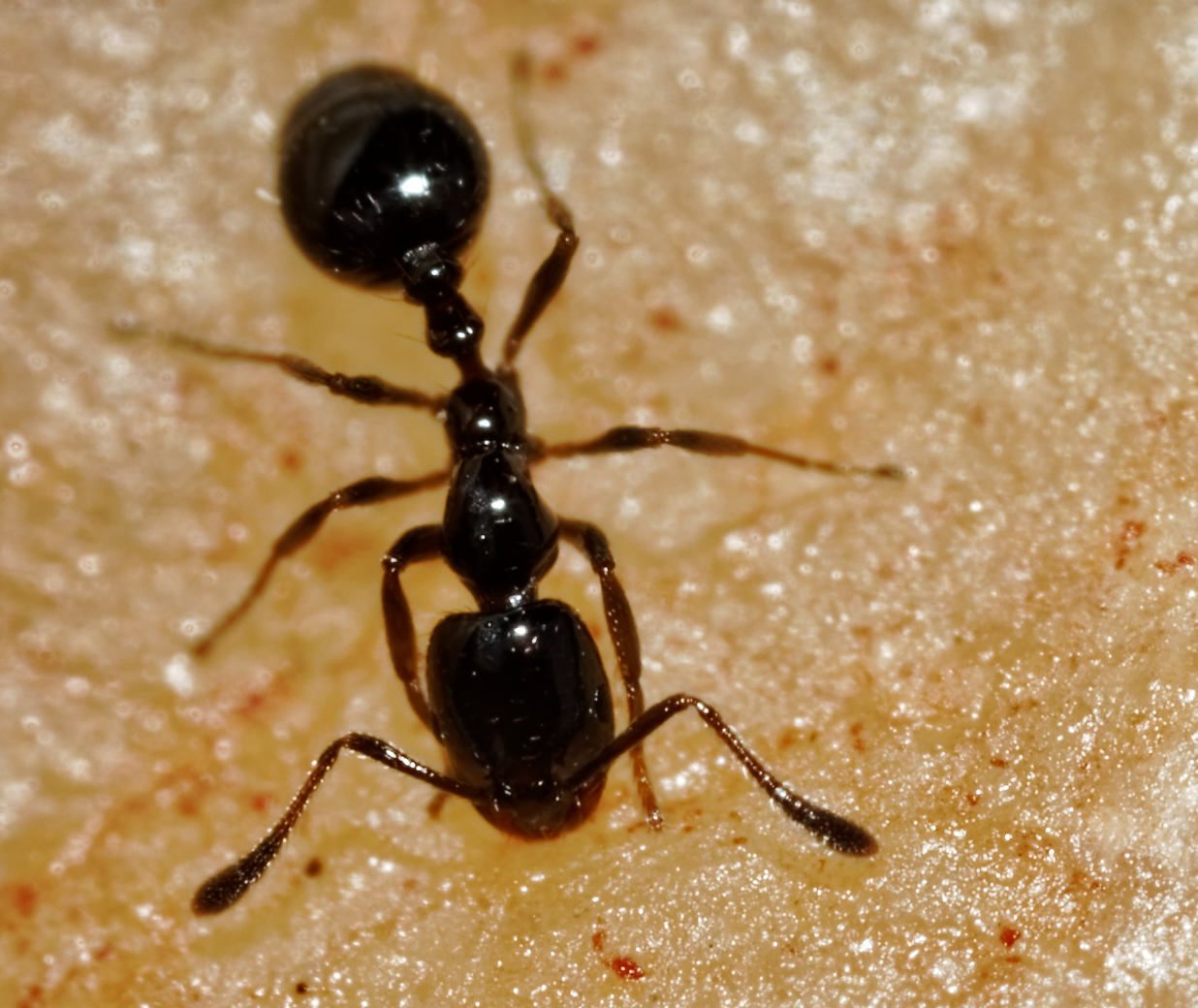
M. carbonarium ant foraging
