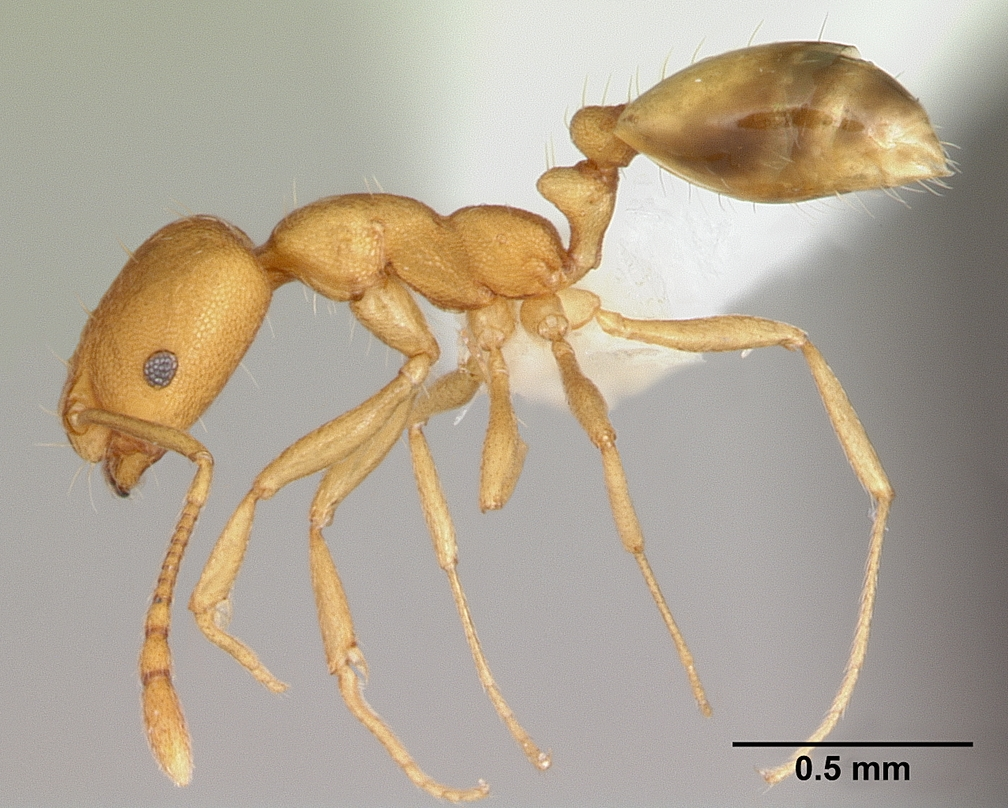

Scientific classification
- Kingdom: Animalia
- Phylum: Arthropoda
- Clade: Pancrustacea
- Class: Insecta
- Order: Hymenoptera
- Family: Formicidae
- Subfamily: Myrmicinae
- Genus: Monomorium
- Species: M. pharaonis

Binomial name
- Monomorium pharaonis (Linnaeus, 1758)

Synonyms
- Formica pharaonis Myrmica pharaonis

= Pharaoh ant =

Species of ant

The pharaoh ant (Monomorium pharaonis) is a small (2 mm) yellow or light brown, almost transparent ant notorious for being a major indoor nuisance pest, especially in hospitals. A cryptogenic species, it has now been introduced to virtually every area of the world, including Europe, the Americas, Australasia and Southeast Asia. It is a major pest in the United States, Australia, and Europe. The ant's common name is possibly derived from the belief that it was one of the Egyptian (pharaonic) plagues.

This species is polygynous—each colony contains many queens—leading to unique caste interactions and colony dynamics. This also allows the colony to fragment into bud colonies quickly.

Pharaoh ants are a tropical species, but they also thrive in buildings almost anywhere, even in temperate regions provided central heating is present.

== Physical characteristics ==
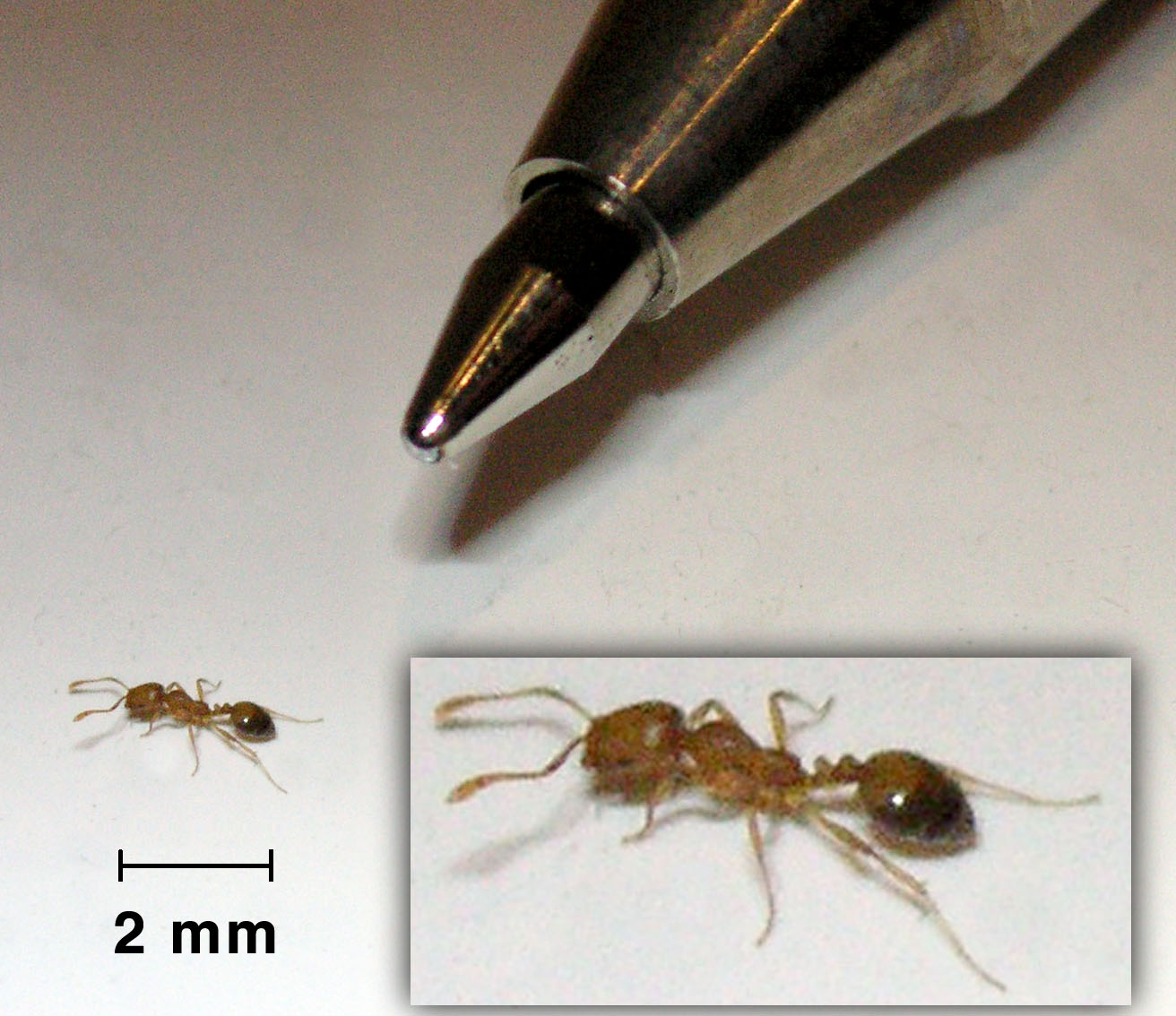
A pharaoh ant worker near the tip of a ball point pen

Pharaoh workers are about 2.9–4.5 millimetres (3/16 in) long. They are light yellow to reddish brown in color with a darker abdomen. Pharaoh ant workers have a non-functional stinger used to generate pheromones. The petiole (narrow waist between the thorax and abdomen) has two nodes and the thorax has no spines. Pharaoh ant eyesight is poor and they possess on average 32 ommatidia. The antennal segments end in a distinct club with three progressively longer segments.

Males are about 6 millimetres (1/4 in) long, black, winged (but do not fly). Queens are dark red and 3.6–5.0 millimetres (1/8–3/16 in) long. They initially have wings that are lost soon after mating, but do not fly.

== Life cycle ==
The pharaoh ant queen can lay hundreds of eggs in her lifetime. Most lay 10 to 12 eggs per batch in the early days of egg production and only four to seven eggs per batch later. At 27 °C (80 °F) and 80 percent relative humidity, eggs hatch in five to seven days. The larval period is 18 to 19 days, pre-pupal period three days and pupal period nine days. About four more days are required to produce sexual female and male forms. From egg to sexual maturity, it takes the pharaoh ant about 38 to 45 days, depending on temperature and relative humidity. They breed continuously throughout the year in heated buildings and mating occurs in the nest. Mature colonies contain several queens, winged males, workers, eggs, larvae, pre-pupae and pupae.

== Colony proliferation ==
Each colony produces sexually reproductive individuals roughly twice a year. However, colonies raised in a laboratory can be manipulated to produce sexuals at any time of year. Colonies proliferate by "budding" (also called "satelliting" or "fractionating"), where a subset of the colony including queens, workers and brood (eggs, larvae and pupae) leave the main colony for an alternative nest site.

Pharaoh ant colonies appear to prefer familiar nests to novel nests while budding. This suggests the ability for colonies to remember certain qualities of their living space. However, if the novel (unfamiliar) nest is of superior quality, the colony may initially move toward the familiar, but will eventually select the unfamiliar. The colony assumes the familiar nest is preferable, unless they sense better qualities in the novel nest. This decision-making process seeks to minimize the time the colony is without a nest while optimizing the nest the colony finally chooses.

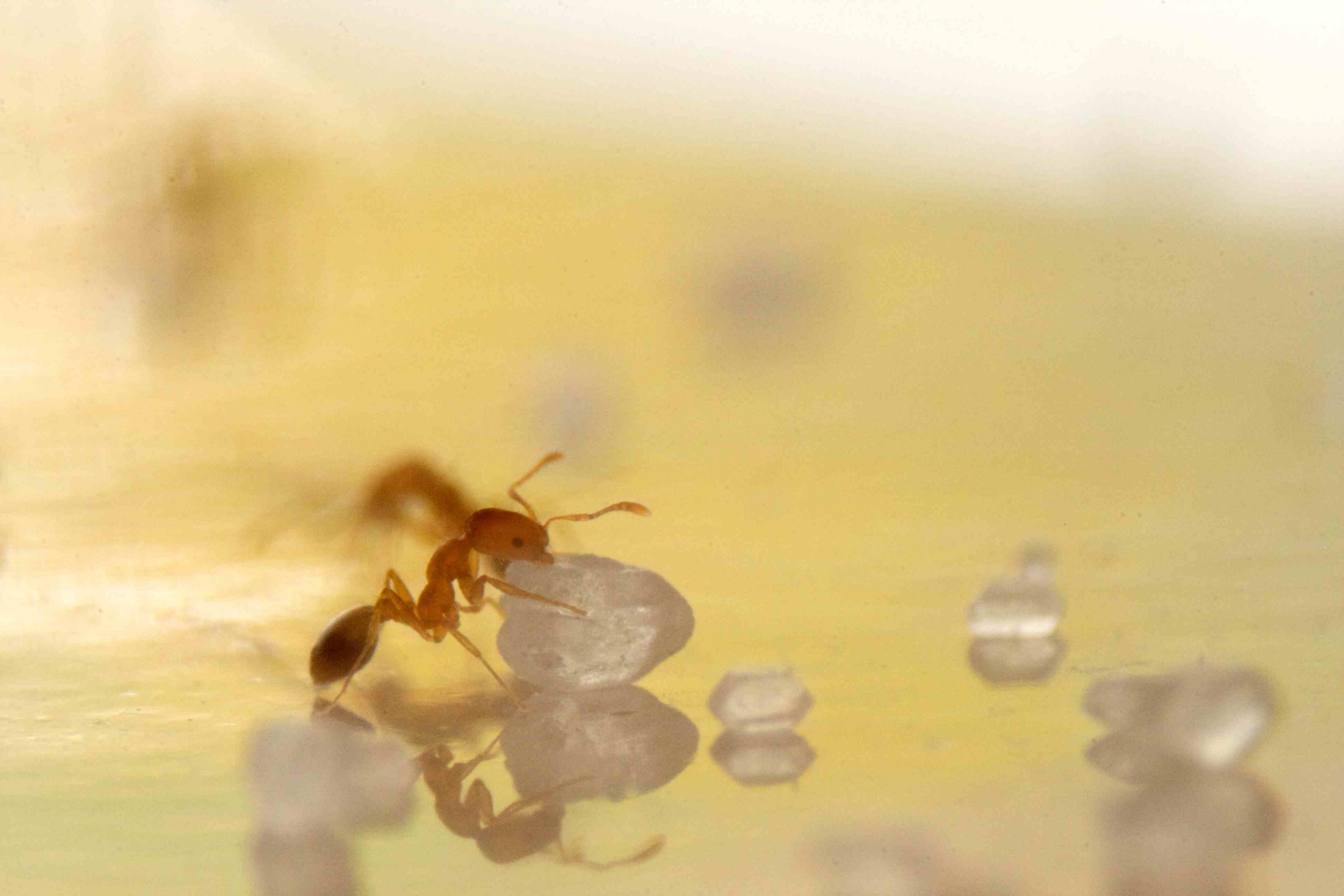
Monomorium pharaonis worker with single sugar crystal

The number of available budding locations has a large effect on colony fragmentation. A large number of bud nests results in small colony fragments, indicating that the colony has the ability to control size and caste ratios. However, a minimum group size of 469 individuals appears preferred by the species. Amount of fragmentation does not have an effect on food distribution. After budding, nest units do not compete for resources, but rather act cooperatively. This is evolutionarily explained by the high amount of genetic relatedness among these nest units. In addition, major disturbances to the central nest cause the colony to abandon it and flee to a bud nest. Thus, nest units may exchange individuals after budding occurs, further explaining their cooperative behavior.

In Australia, Monomorium species is particularly successful. This fact is particularly curious because of the presence of a very aggressive ant family, Iridomyrmex, which is quite proficient at interference competition. Iridomyrmex ants are able to quickly seek out food sources and prevent other ant species from reaching them. However, unlike other ant species, Monomorium species, despite their unaggressive nature and small size, are able to thrive even in areas where Iridomyrmex dominates. This success can be attributed to their efficient foraging strategy, and their novel use of venom alkaloids, repellant chemical signals. With these two behaviors, Monomorium species can rapidly monopolize and defend food sources.

== Foraging trail pheromones ==
Pharaoh ants utilize three types of trail pheromones. One is a long-lasting attractive chemical that is used to build a trail network. It remains detectable even if the ants do not use the trail for several days. Pharaoh ants cease activity at night and begin each day of work at around 8 am, yet parts of the trail network are identical each day. The second pheromone is also attractive, but will decay to imperceptible amounts in a matter of minutes without reapplication. This pheromone is useful in marking food sources, as these are unpredictable and the colony must be able to respond to environmental changes quickly. Individuals will not waste their time on an unprofitable trail route. The third pheromone is a repellent. Pharaoh ants were the first species found to use a negative trail pheromone. If an individual finds an unprofitable area with little food or significant danger, it will release this repellent pheromone, which will warn others and cause them to look elsewhere. While positive pheromones indicating lucrative foraging sites are very common in social insects, the pharaoh ant's negative pheromone is highly unusual. Like the food source marker, the negative pheromone is volatile, decaying roughly two hours after being emitted. It may even be insecticidal in some cases. It is so powerful that an individual can detect it from 30 millimetres (1.2 in) away. Pharaoh ants utilize this pheromone near forks in the trail network, and an ant that detects it will begin to walk in a zigzag manner.

Both the attractive and repellent pheromones are utilized in the decision-making an ant must make while foraging. The repellent pheromone is especially useful in the repositioning of trails after a new food source has been introduced. It also helps prevent ants from concentrating on an undesirable trail. Thus, the repellant pheromone makes the pharaoh ant a particularly efficient forager. Despite their extreme importance, there is an adaptive value to using pheromones sparingly, as it streamlines communication during important decision-making situations, such as a nest migration.

== Foraging ==
Pharaoh ants use a positive feedback system of foraging. Each morning, scouts will search for food. When one finds it, it will immediately return to the nest. This causes several ants to follow the successful scout's trail back to the food source. Soon, a large group will be upon the food. Scouts are thought to use both chemical and visual cues to remain aware of the nest location and find their way. If the colony is exploring a new region, they employ a land rush tactic, in which a large number of foragers randomly search, constantly releasing pheromones.

Even though M. pharaonis is most often thought an indoor pest, foraging has been found to be more prevalent outside. Even inside colonies were found to forage close to windows, indicating a propensity for outdoor environment.

=== Trails ===
Even though scouts search independently, they use a distinct trail system that remains somewhat constant from day to day. The system consists of one to four trunk routes. Every scout uses one of these trunks in the beginning and end of its food search. In this way, the trunks get continuous chemical reinforcement and do not change much. Each trunk divides into many branch routes. These will change based on food availability.

The organization of foraging trails is strongly affected by the health of the colony and the availability of food. Food deprivation induces a higher amount of foraging ant traffic, compared to a non-deprived population. If a food source is presented to the food deprived colony, this traffic was further increased, an indication of the pharaoh ant's recruitment tactic. If food is not present, a colony will extend its trails to a wider radius around the nest. Logically, number of trails and forager traffic is largest near a food source.

While pheromones explain the pharaoh ant's foraging ability, each forager's capability to find its way back to the nest requires a different explanation. In fact, the pharaoh ant relies on geometry to show it the way home. Each fork in the trail system spreads at an angle between 50 and 60 degrees. When returning to the nest, a forager that encounters a fork will almost always take the path that deviates less from its current direction. In other words, it will never choose an acute angle that would drastically change its direction. Using this algorithm, each forager is able to find its way back to the nest. If the fork angle is experimentally increased to an angle between 60 and 120 degrees, M. pharaonis foragers were significantly less able to find their nest. This method of decision-making reduces the wasted energy that would result from traveling in the wrong direction and contributes to the pharaoh ant's efficiency in foraging.

=== Feeding ===
Upon scouts' return with food, the queens will attempt to beg for their share. Depending on food availability and each individual's condition, a scout may refuse the queen's entreaties and even run away from her. The decision of an individual to give up food to the queen may be beneficial in situations of plentiful food, as a healthy queen can reproduce and propagate the colony's genes. However, when food is highly scarce, an individual's own survival can outweigh this potential benefit. She will therefore refuse to give up food.

A queen may also feed on secretions from larvae. This creates a positive feedback loop in which more larvae will provide more food to queens who can in turn produce more larvae.

If a large amount of larvae results in a surplus of secretions, pharaoh ants will store the excess in the gasters of a unique caste, the replete workers. Members of this group have enormous gasters and can regurgitate their stored food when needed. In this way, the colony has a cushion against food shortages.

Pharaoh ants have a sophisticated strategy for food preference. They implement two related behaviors. The first is known as satiation. The workers will at first show a strong preference for a particular food type. However, if this food is offered alone, with no other options, for several weeks, workers will afterward show a distinct preference for a different type of food. In this way, the ants become satiated on a certain food group and will change their decision. The second behavior is called alternation. If given the continuous choice between food groups, pharaoh ants will tend to alternate between carbohydrate-rich foods and protein-rich foods. These satiation and alternation behaviors are evolutionarily adaptive. The decision to vary the type of food consumed ensures that the colony maintains a balanced diet. Edwards & Abraham 1990's result is appropriate for highly competitive environments, and consistent with a high intake:expenditure ratio.

== Caste system ==
Monomorium pharaonis, similar to other invasive ants, is polygynous, meaning its colonies contain many queens (up to 200). It is hypothesized that polygyny leads to lower levels of nestmate recognition in comparison to monogynous species due to the expected higher levels of genetic diversity. Because these colonies lack nestmate recognition, there is no hostility between neighbouring colonies, which is known as unicoloniality.

Many invasive ants display unicoloniality. The adaptive value of this nonaggression among colonies has to do with avoiding unnecessary injury and allowing proper resource allocation, ensuring success for all the colonies. Low nestmate recognition, caused in part by polygyny, also has a biochemical basis in M. pharaonis. Cuticular hydrocarbons are compounds, often found on antennae, that allow for communication in many social insects. In ant species, these compounds play an especially key role in nestmate recognition. Differences in cuticular hydrocarbons are detected by other ant species, who respond accordingly. However, all pharaoh ant colonies have the same hydrocarbons on their antennae. This leads to ineffective nestmate recognition, and nonaggression between colonies.

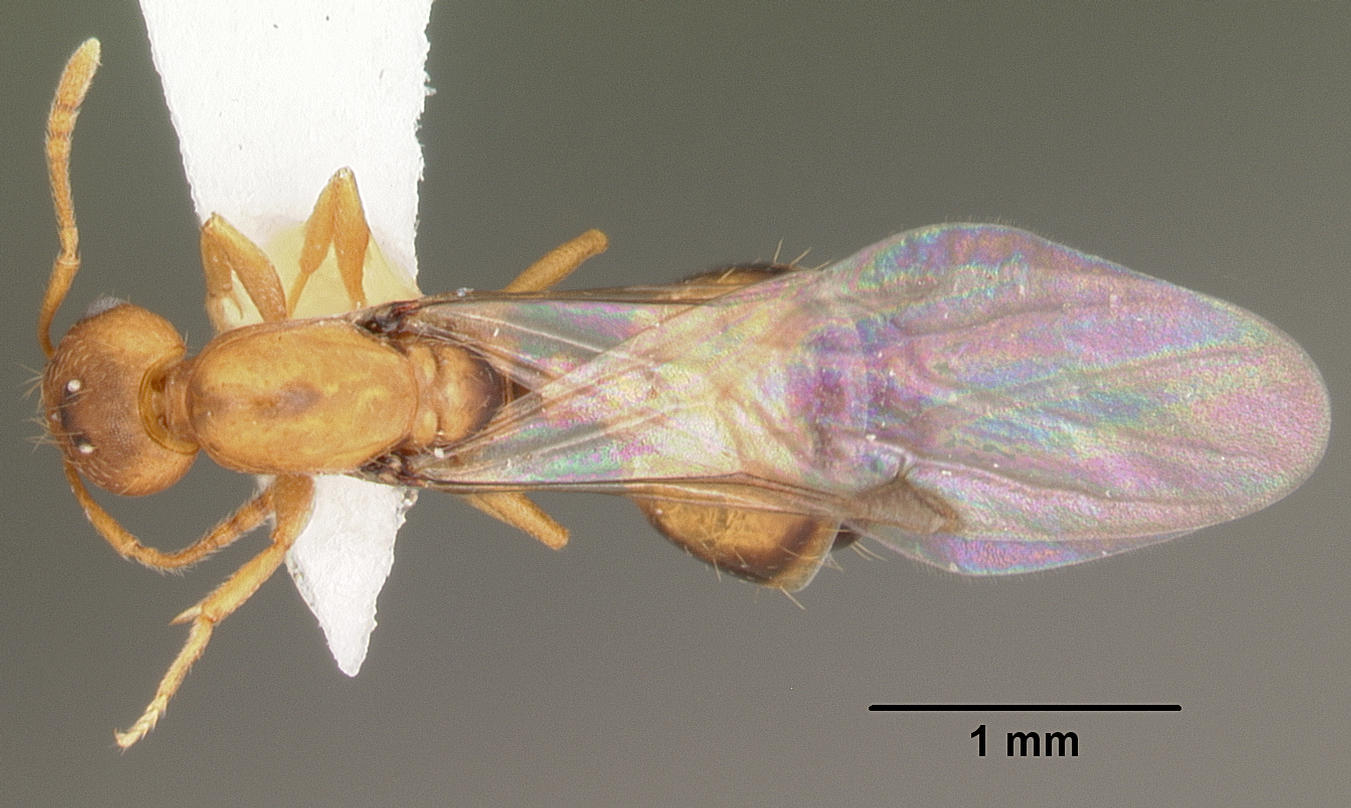
Dorsal view of an alate pharaoh ant

Pharaoh ant colonies contain many queens. The ratio of queens to workers is variable and dependent on the size of the colony. An individual colony normally contains 1,000–2,500 workers, but often a high density of nests gives the impression of massive colonies. In a small colony, there will be more queens relative to workers. In addition, individuals will be larger than those in a more populous colony. This ratio is controlled by the workers in the colony. Larvae that will produce workers have characteristic hairs all over them, while larvae that will produce sexual males or females are bare. It is thought that workers can use these distinguishing features to identify larvae. Workers may cannibalize larvae in order to ensure a favorable caste ratio. This decision to cannibalize is largely determined by the present caste ratio. If plenty of fertile queens are present, for example, the workers may eat sexual larvae. The caste ratios are controlled in an attempt to maximize the growth of the colony. For example, in a small colony, the ratio of queens to workers is increased. This in turn increases the potential for reproduction, allowing colony growth. Conversely, in a large colony, the high worker to queen ratio maximizes the foraging capacity of the nest, helping sustain the population size.

== Nest demographic ==
The pharaoh ant is a polygynous species that has a relatively low worker to queen ratio of around 12.86. This allows the pharaoh ants to be able to exert social control over the size of the colony and the size of each caste. In the average nest, there are around 170 ± 8 queens, which comprises around 5.2% of the total population, whereas there are around 2185 ± 49 workers, which make up around 66.6% of the population. This low worker to queen ratio is usually associated with swift changes in the nest and may be why pharaoh ants form many new nest buds quickly. To branch out and form a new bud nest, pharaoh ants need a minimum of 469 ± 28 individuals, which explains how they proliferate so quickly.

== Reproduction ==
Mating for pharaoh ants occurs within the nests with males that are usually not from the colony which ensures genetic diversity. The queen can typically produce eggs in batches of 10 to 12 at once, but can lay up to 400 eggs every time she mates. The eggs that are produced take up to 42 days to mature from an egg to an adult. Each queen within the nest lives between 4 and 12 months.

During copulation, sperm is transferred from male to female inside a spermatophore. There are several theories regarding the adaptive value of using a spermatophore. It contains certain chemicals that may inhibit the female's sex drive. Alternatively, it may physically plug the female's gonophore. In either explanation, the spermatophore prevents the female from reproducing with another male. In essence, the use of a spermatophore is evolutionarily favorable because it increases the probability of the male's genetic code being transferred to subsequent generations by lessening potential competition from other males.

Pharaoh ant copulation, like that of many social insects, is harmful to the female. The penis valve contains sharp teeth, which latch onto a thick, soft cuticular layer in the female. This method of copulation too has an evolutionary basis. The teeth ensure sex lasts long enough for sufficient sperm transfer. Also, the pain caused to the female may, in some ways, lessen her desire to mate again.

== Queen–worker relationship ==
When the queen ant first moves to a new nest, she will rear the first group of workers. Once a worker threshold has been reached, resources will then be invested into new males and queens. When a new nest is formed, queens are not a necessity; workers can raise new queens after finding a suitable nest site.

In pharaoh ant colonies new males and queen ants can be produced when the existing fertile queen is removed. When queens are absent, the workers in the nest can do two things: either rear existing sexual larvae or transport sexual larvae from other bud nests or from the main nest to its own nest. However, when there are fertile queens still within the nest, the worker ants will cannibalize the sexual larvae and will either reject or consume sexual larvae from other nests. On the other hand, the worker ants will always accept and nurture worker larvae from other nests. Furthermore, according to Schmidt et al., polygamous species such as pharaoh ants will have higher resource allocations towards the female caste instead of the worker caste to ensure rapid growth of new budding colonies.

== Colony interaction ==
When social ants encounter ants from another colony, behavior can be either aggressive or non-aggressive. Aggressive behavior is very commonly seen; the attacking worker usually bites the opponent at the petiole. In non-aggressive behavior, antennation occurs when the two ants meet. In the case of Monomorium pharaonis, behavior is almost always non-aggressive even when the ants are from different colonies and of different castes. Very few cases exist where aggressive behavior is seen in these ants.

== Washing ==
After foraging, pharaoh ants will wash themselves when a worker enters the cell. Pharaoh ants will also wash after a long feed. It has been proposed that washing has a hygienic value, keeping the nest area clean, staving off disease and disorder. Right before workers leave to forage, they also may wash themselves. However, in this instance the behavior is extremely violent, often causing the ants to fall over. It is thought that here, the washing behavior has no hygienic value and instead may be a displacement activity, a sign that the ants are deliberating whether or not to exit the nest.

== Invasiveness and extermination ==
Budding is a major factor underlying the invasiveness of pharaoh ants. A single seed colony can populate a large office block, almost to the exclusion of all other insect pests, in less than six months. Elimination and control are difficult because multiple colonies can consolidate into smaller colonies during extermination programs only to repopulate later.

Pharaoh ants have become a serious pest in almost every type of building. They can feed on a wide variety of foods including grease, sugary foods, and dead insects. They can also gnaw holes in silk, rayon and rubber goods. Nests can be very small, making detection even more difficult. They are usually found in wall voids, under floors, or in various types of furniture. In homes, they are often found foraging in bathrooms or near food.

Attempts to exterminate Pharaoh ants using insecticidal sprays and dusts are usually ineffective because they will cause the pharaoh ants to scatter and colonies to split; however, some non-repellent residual insecticides have been reported to be effective.

The recommended method to eliminate pharaoh ants is by the use of baits attractive to the species. Modern baits use insect growth regulators (IGRs) as the active substance; the ants are attracted to the bait by its food content, and take it back to the nest. Over a period of weeks the IGR prevents the production of worker ants and sterilizes the queen. Renewing the baits once or twice may be necessary.

Pharaoh and other ants have also been exterminated with baits of 1% boric acid and sugar water.

== See also ==
- Argentine ant, another known pest species
