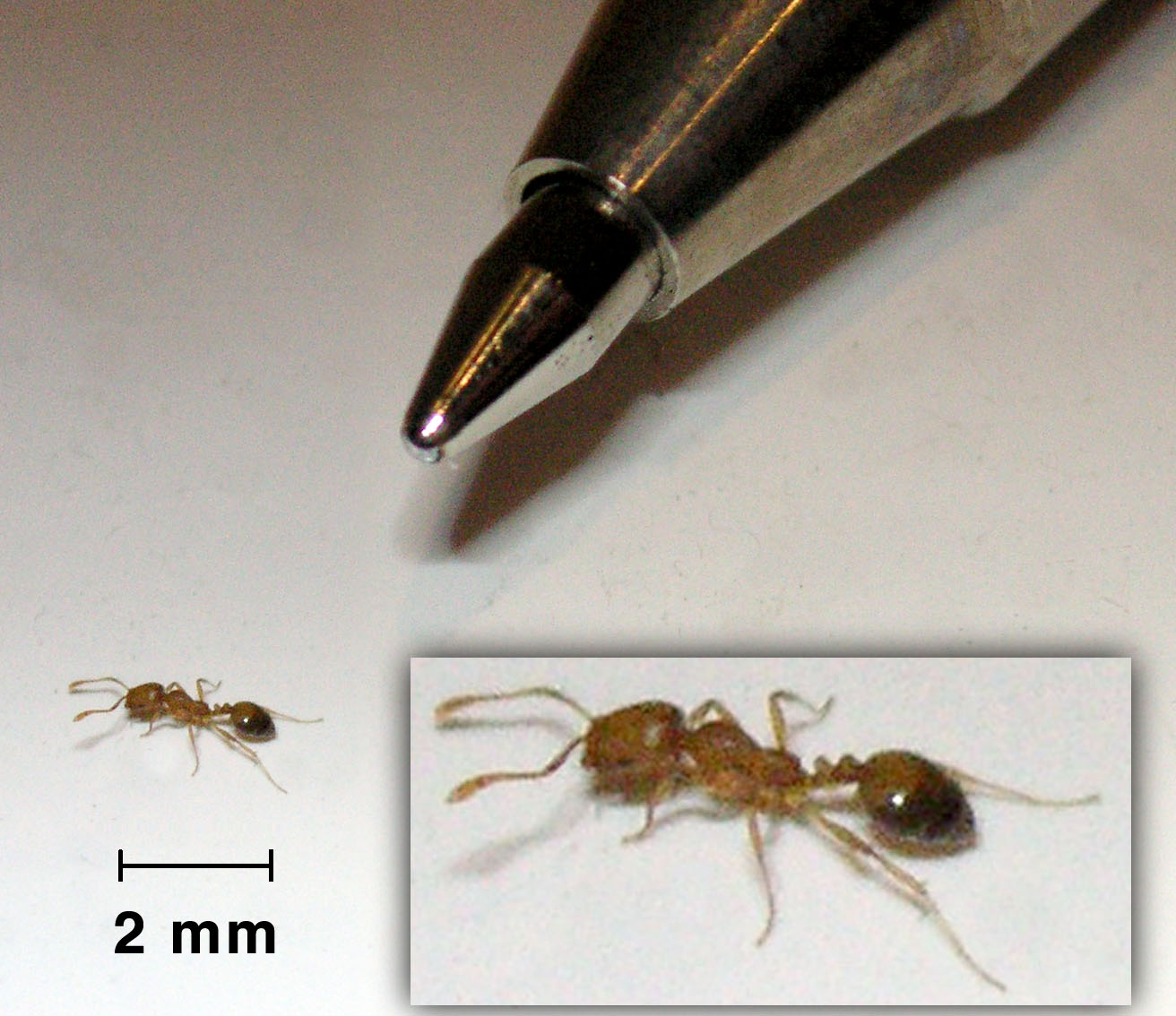
- Monomorium pharaonis, and the tip of a pen for scale comparison

Scientific classification
- Kingdom: Animalia
- Phylum: Arthropoda
- Clade: Pancrustacea
- Class: Insecta
- Order: Hymenoptera
- Family: Formicidae
- Subfamily: Myrmicinae
- Tribe: Solenopsidini
- Genus: Monomorium; Mayr, 1855

Type species
- Monomorium minutum Mayr, 1855

Species
- about 396

Synonyms
- Antichthonidris; Nothidris; Phacota others

= Monomorium =

Monomorium Temporal range: Eocene–Recent

Genus of ants

Monomorium is a genus of ants in the subfamily Myrmicinae. As of 2013 it contains about 396 species. It is distributed around the world, with many species native to the Old World tropics. It is considered to be "one of the more important groups of ants," considering its widespread distribution, its diversity, and its variety of morphological and biological characteristics. It also includes several familiar pest species, such as the pharaoh ant (M. pharaonis) and the flower ant (M. floricola).

== Description ==
This genus is very diverse in morphology, with species of many shapes and sizes that "do not necessarily even remotely resemble one another" at first glance.

In certain species, the worker caste is monomorphic, whereas in others, it is polymorphic. In some species the workers are minute, in others they are rather large. Large, multifaceted eyes are common, but M. inusuale has much reduced eyes, as do some species from Africa. The sting is always functional.

== Taxonomy ==
By the early 20th century Monomorium was already a large genus, with 10 subgenera. It was further expanded in 2007, when the genera Nothidris, Epelysidris, and Phacota were synonymized with Monomorium. The small genera Anillomyrma, Megalomyrmex, and perhaps Bondroita should possibly also be included in Monomorium.

The exact boundaries of the genus are still to be determined: it has no distinct morphological traits that set it apart from other genera in the tribe Solenopsidini. If cladistics were strictly applied, all Solenopsidini would be grouped in the single genus Solenopsis, but the tribe lacks a strong synapomorphy. As with the genera Camponotus and Leptothorax, Monomorium as it currently stands is paraphyletic.

Subsequent studies using molecular techniques have suggested ways to break up the genus. A 2015 study resurrected the previously synonymised genus Syllophopsis (including Ireneidris) from within Monomorium. Epelysidris was also resurrected to contain the species E. brocha. In 2019 the genus Chelaner was resurrected for 53 Australasian and Pacific species, including the common New Zealand species Chelaner antipodum.

== Biology ==
Most ants of this genus nest in rotting wood, under rocks, or in the soil. Some species are scavengers, while others are seed collectors. Many species have venom containing alkaloids, which they use as a defense from predators. Besides its morphological variation, the genus is also variable in chromosome number, with 2n of 16 to 70 recorded.

== Distribution ==
As of 2006, 36 species are described from Madagascar, 19 of which were described in that year alone. About 43 species are known from Australia and 30 from Arabia.

== Selected species ==
- Monomorium antarcticum
- Monomorium bidentatum
- Monomorium chinense
- Monomorium carbonarium – little black ant
- Monomorium delabiei Fernández, 2007
- Monomorium dentatum
- Monomorium denticulatum
- Monomorium effractor
- Monomorium fieldi
- Monomorium floricola – flower ant
- Monomorium hospitum
- Monomorium inquilinum
- Monomorium kondratieffi Sharaf & Aldawood, 2013
- Monomorium monomorium Bolton, 1987 (= Mononorium minutum Mayr, 1855)
- Monomorium noualhieri
- Monomorium pergandei
- Monomorium pharaonis – pharaoh ant
- Monomorium rubriceps
- Monomorium santschii
- Monomorium smithi
- Monomorium talbotae
