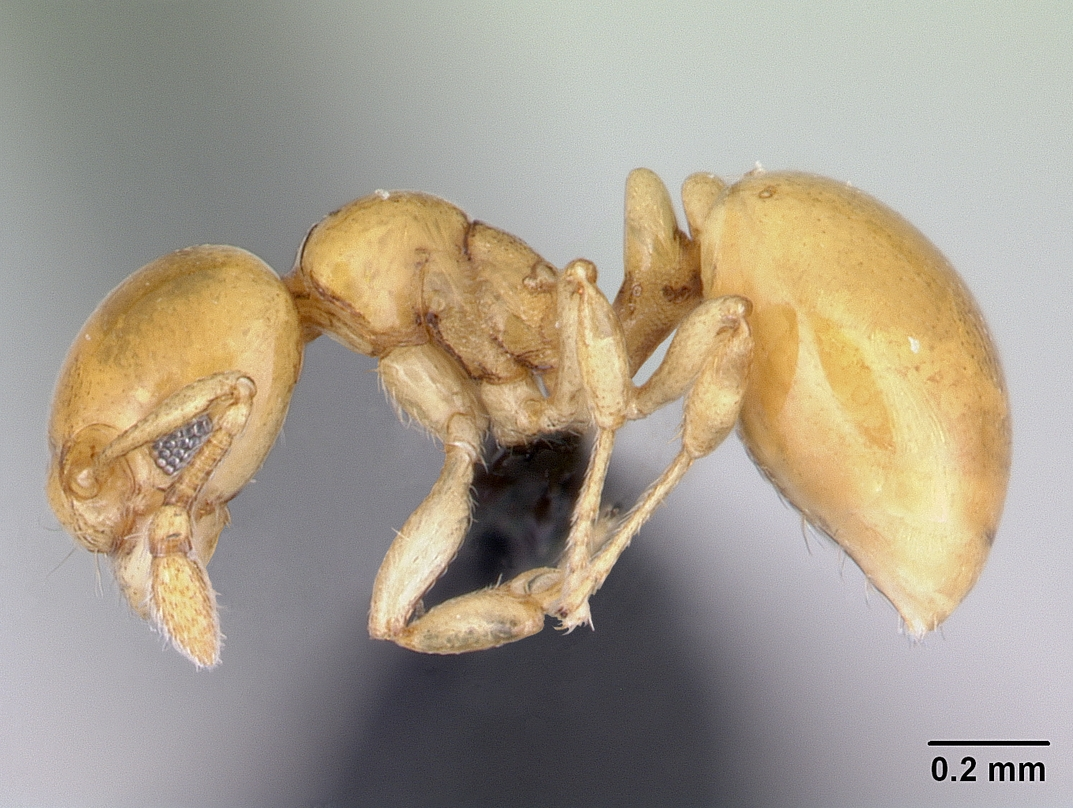
- Diaphoromyrma sofiae worker

Scientific classification
- Kingdom: Animalia
- Phylum: Arthropoda
- Class: Insecta
- Order: Hymenoptera
- Family: Formicidae
- Subfamily: Myrmicinae
- Tribe: Attini
- Genus: Diaphoromyrma; Fernández, Delabie & Nascimento, 2009
- Species: D. sofiae

Binomial name
- Diaphoromyrma sofiae Fernández, Delabie & Nascimento, 2009

= Diaphoromyrma =

Genus of ants

Diaphoromyrma (from Greek diaphoros, "different"/"remarkable", + myrmekos, "ant") is a genus of ants in the subfamily Myrmicinae. It contains the single species Diaphoromyrma sofiae, known only from workers from the type locality in Bahia, Brazil. The genus is apparently close to Allomerus and Diplomorium in the Solenopsidini, but its tribal attribution remains uncertain.

== Distribution and habitat ==
The genus is known only from workers from Bahia, Brazil. The species was collected in litter samples taken in three rain forest remnants in the extreme southern portion of Bahia using the Winkler extraction. The landscape is dominated by forested valleys inserted in the coastal plateau (Barreiras Formation, Tertiary origin). Most of the vegetation of the remnants was in an initial or medium stage of regeneration, in a region where eucalypt plantations currently predominate.

== Description ==
Diaphoromyrma workers are characterized by the following traits: Antenna 9-segmented with 2-segmented club, trapezoidal promesonotum in dorsal view, propodeal spiracles situated on the propodeal edges, and the fourth abdominal sternite with a pair of rounded recurved anterolateral extensions which curve up onto the dorsal surface of the segment. Apparently Diaphoromyrma is close to the genera Allomerus and Diplomorium in the Solenopsidini, but its tribal attribution remains difficult because of the inadequate resolution of the phylogenetic relationships within the Myrmicinae.

The combination of traits differentiates this thus far monotypic genus from any other myrmicine. The unique shape of the promesonotum, trapezoidal in dorsal view and with well defined angles at the sides; the comparatively high and narrow petiolar node, contrasting with the broader, low and round postpetiolar node, the low position of the insertion of the postpetiole on the anterior face of first gastral segment, and the dorsal extensions of abdominal sternite 4 are unique and represent potential apomorphies of Diaphoromyrma.

Usually in myrmicine ants the dorsal margin of the postpetiole is higher than the top of first gastral tergite, in lateral view. In Diaphoromyrma the joining of the postpetiole with the gaster is so ventral that the postpetiole in lateral view is very low relative to the upper margin of the gaster. The rounded and recurved anterolateral extensions of the fourth abdominal sternite, which curve up onto the dorsal surface of the segment and are visible in dorsal view, delimiting two round semicircular areas, are unique in Myrmicinae. Some cephalotines have differentiated anterolateral extensions on abdominal segment 4, but from the tergite, and not from the sternite.

Gynes, males, and larvae are unknown.

== Taxonomy ==
As with some other myrmicine ant genera recently described (Tyrannomyrmex, Dolopomyrmex, Tropidomyrmex), Diaphoromyrma is difficult to relate to any of the tribal taxa defined by Bolton (2003). The central clypeal seta is characteristic of the Solenopsidini (sensu Bolton 1987), although they may not be homologous, but the clypeal configuration differentiates Diaphoromyrma from this group as defined in Bolton (2003). As pointed out by Bolton (1987 and 2003), Allomerus and Diplomorium are problematical genera in the Solenopsidini, as the posterior portion of the clypeus is relatively broad. However, Diaphoromyrma lacks any of the diagnostic attributes of both genera (antennal club segments constricted basally in Allomerus and postpetiole broadly attached to the gaster in Diplomorium; and also antennal club 3-segmented in both genera). The 2-segmented antennal club and the specialized first segment of the gaster suggest that Diaphoromyrma is not closely related to either of these genera.

The membership of Diaphoromyrma in Stenammini or Adelomyrmecini (the other tribes of the solenopsidine tribe group [Bolton 2003]) is unlikely. Diaphoromyrma lacks the specialized lamellate hairs on the ventral side of masticatory margin of adelomyrmecine mandibles or the various traits listed in Bolton (2003) for stenammines, namely the clypeal configuration. Although Diaphoromyrma possess the clypeus broadly inserted between the frontal lobes, it lacks any of the traits defining the tribes Myrmicini, Lenomyrmecini, Pheidolini, Tetramoriini or Paratopulini. Diaphoromyrma should also be compared with the formicoxenine tribe group (Bolton 2003). The membership of the genus in the tribe Formicoxenini is complicated by several differences: the toruli are slightly exposed in Diaphoromyrma (partially visible in only a few taxa of Formicoxenini), the propodeal lobes are relatively reduced (present and usually rounded in Formicoxenini), the antenna is 9-segmented with 2-segmented club (antenna with 8 to 12 segments and with 3 or 4–segmented club in Formicoxenini, but never with this combination). This genus is also clearly not a member of the other myrmicine tribes as presented or proposed in Bolton (2003).
