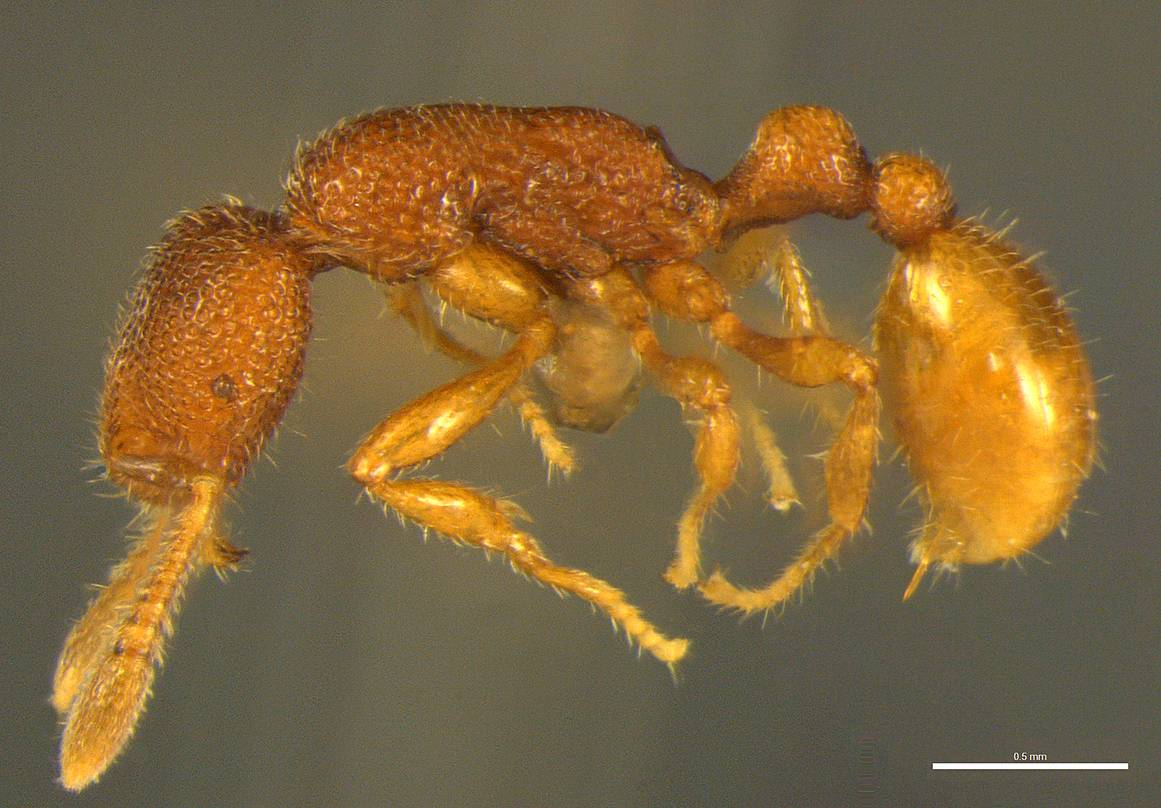
- T. alii holotype worker

Scientific classification
- Kingdom: Animalia
- Phylum: Arthropoda
- Clade: Pancrustacea
- Class: Insecta
- Order: Hymenoptera
- Family: Formicidae
- Subfamily: Myrmicinae
- Genus: Tyrannomyrmex
- Species: T. alii

Binomial name
- Tyrannomyrmex alii Sadasivan & Kripakaran, 2017

= Tyrannomyrmex alii =

Species of ant

Tyrannomyrmex alii is a species of tropical ant in the subfamily Myrmicinae. T. alii is native to the Western Ghats in India. The species was described from workers and a winged queen, the first Tyrannomyrmex species in which a queen has been described, while the males are not known. Three additional species are also known, with one also being native to the Western Ghats.

== Distribution and habitat ==
The only known location where T. alii has been found is in the Western Ghats Periyar National Park in the Idukki district of southern India. The region is considered to be among the major world biodiversity hotspots. The habitat consisted of an old-growth evergreen forest at an elevation of 1,100 m (3,600 ft). The specimens were found in dry soil under a rotting log near the base of a tree. The shaded area, near the base of a slope, with the rotting log provided the microhabitat where the ants live, with the nest suggested to be present in the upper layer of soil and lowest portion of the log. No ants were found in the soil surrounding the log and the other species of Tyrannomyrmex have been identified from lone workers thought to be foraging in the leaf litter.

The workers are noted to be slow moving with approximately 35 found in a 50 cm^{2} (7.8 in^{2}) area of soil, in association with one wingless and 16 winged queens. Sadasivan and Kripakaran suggest that the queens may have been in the process of being moved to the surface for release to found new colonies after mating. No males were found in the colony sampled.

T. alii is the fourth species in the genus Tyrannomyrmex to be described, and the second species, after Tyrannomyrmex dux to be described from southern India. The type species Tyrannomyrmex rex is known from two workers, one found in the Pasoh Forest Reserve of southern peninsular Malaysia and one from the MacRitchie Reservoir of Singapore. The second species, Tyrannomyrmex legatus is described solely from a worker collected from the Sinharaja Forest Reserve of Southwestern Sri Lanka.

== History and classification ==
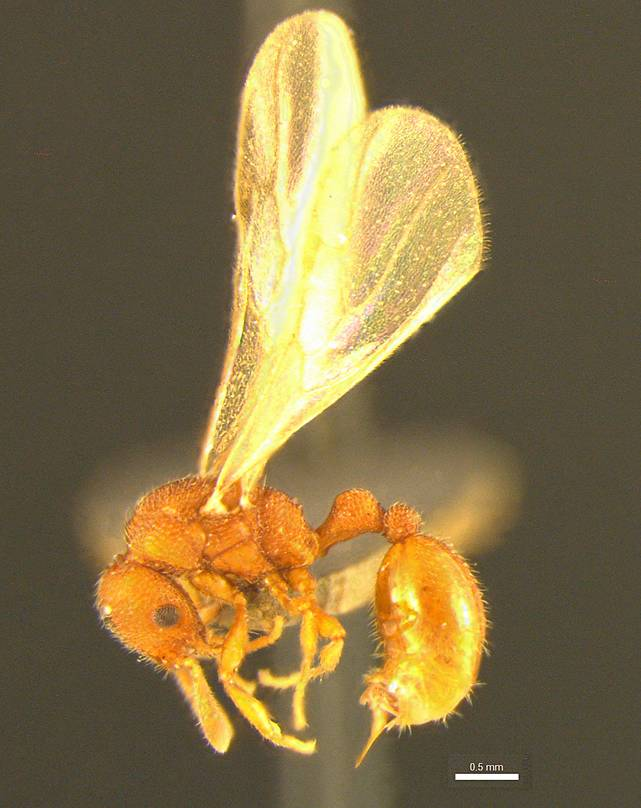
T. alii paratype gyne

The holotype worker and two paratype workers along with a paratype queen were collected on 23 May 2016 and deposited in the collections of the National Centre for Biological Sciences, while an additional paratype worker was placed in the Zoological Survey of India and one in the Gandhi Krishi Vigyan Kendra located in Bangalore. The specimens were studied by Kalesh Sadasivan and Manoj Kripakaran of the Travancore Natural History Society, a non-government organization and they published the species description in a 2017 Zootaxa article. They coined the specific epithet alii as a patronym honoring T. M. Musthak Ali (1945–2020), who mentored them and was a leading Indian myrmecologist, sometimes called India's "Ant Man".

== Description ==
The workers of T. alii are between 2.90–3.15 mm (0.11–0.12 in) in total length and are monomorphic, showing very little difference between individual workers. T. alii workers are distinct from T. dux, which has a very long peduncle forming half the length of the petiole, while in T. alii the petiole has a small ill-defined peduncle. The setae of T. alii are upright along the upper surface of the pronotum, while T. dux and T. legatus have erect setae on all of the mesosoma, and only the front face of the pronotum has erect setae in T. rex.

The paratype gyne is 3.98 mm (0.16 in) long. The head is wide along the rear margin narrows towards the front and the sides and rear are convex. The central area of the rear margin has a slight concave indent. The antennae have eleven segments the three apical ones forming a weak club. The scape extends from the antenna socket almost to the rear margin of the head. Unlike the workers, the eyes of the gyne are composed of more than 100 ommatidia and form about 40% of the convexity on each side of the head. The mandibles are generally triangular in outline, with an angle separating the chewing margin from the basal margin. There are only two teeth present, the longer apical tooth and the shorter, duller pre-apical tooth. After the two teeth, the rest of the interior margin, both chewing and basal, are toothless.
