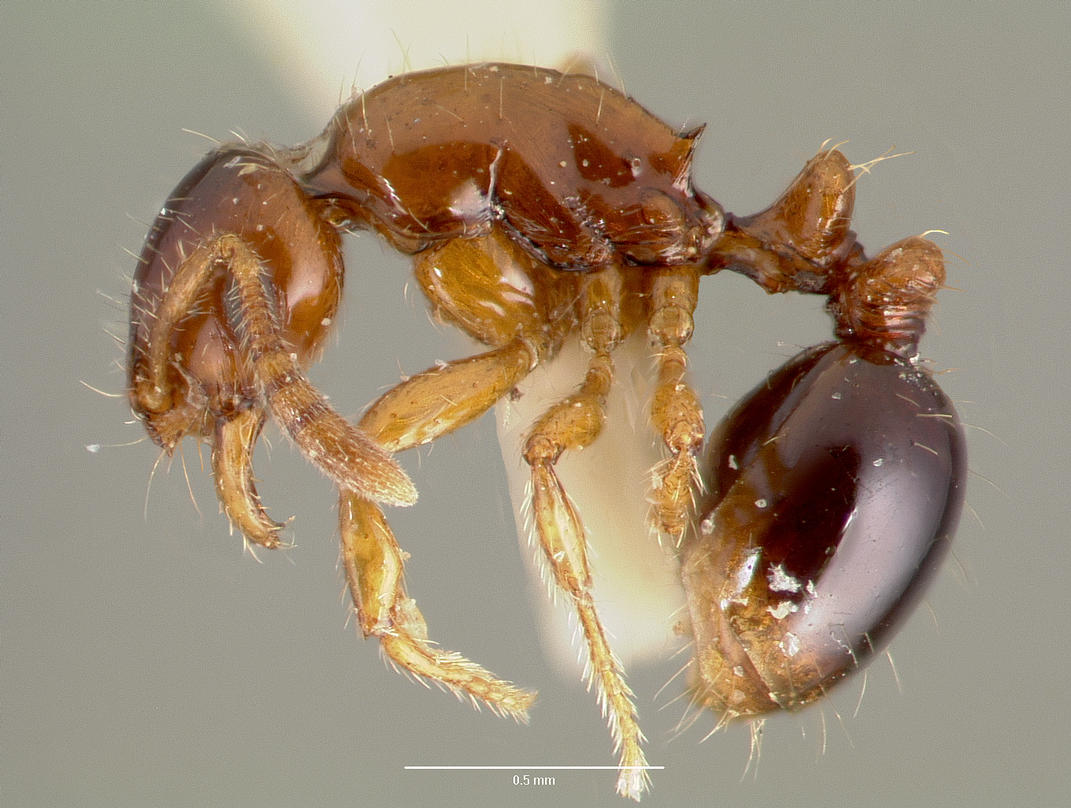
- Oxyepoecus inquilinus worker

Conservation status
- Vulnerable (IUCN 2.3)

Scientific classification
- Kingdom: Animalia
- Phylum: Arthropoda
- Class: Insecta
- Order: Hymenoptera
- Family: Formicidae
- Subfamily: Myrmicinae
- Genus: Oxyepoecus
- Species: O. inquilinus

Binomial name
- Oxyepoecus inquilinus (Kusnezov, 1952)

= Oxyepoecus inquilinus =

Species of ant

Oxyepoecus inquilinus is species of ant in the genus Oxyepoecus. It is endemic to Argentina. The species is listed together with two other Oxyepoecus species (O. daguerrei, and O. bruchi) as "Vulnerable D2" by IUCN.
