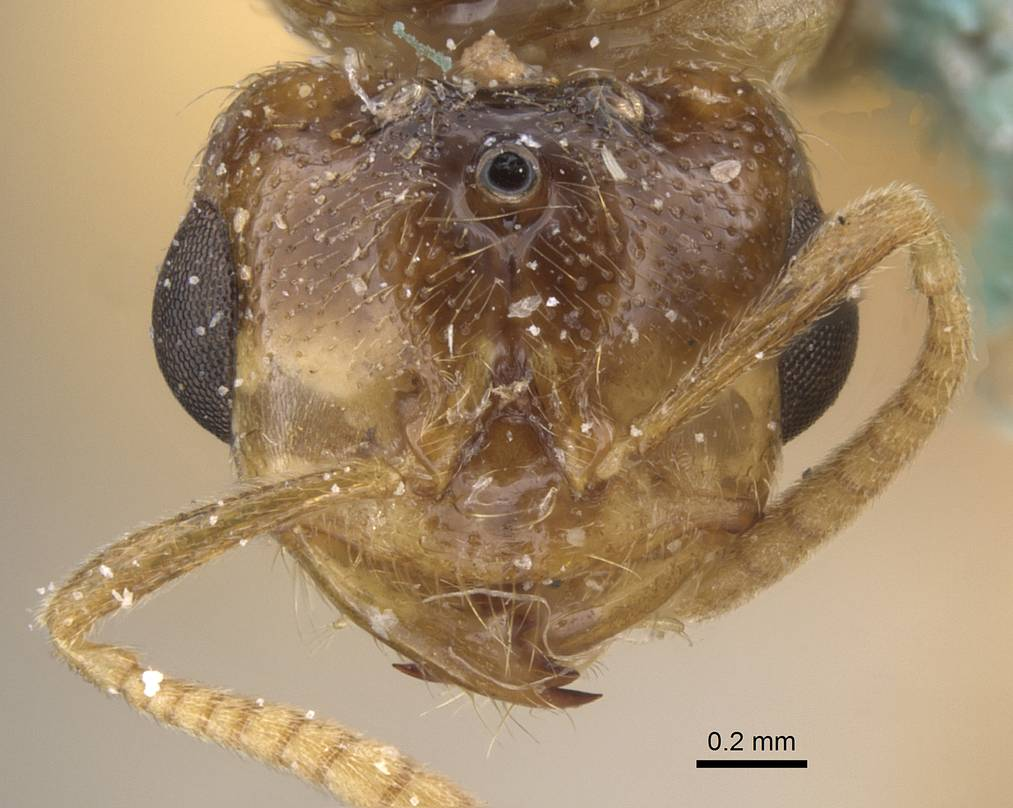

Scientific classification
- Domain: Eukaryota
- Kingdom: Animalia
- Phylum: Arthropoda
- Class: Insecta
- Order: Hymenoptera
- Family: Formicidae
- Subfamily: Myrmicinae
- Genus: Bondroitia
- Species: B. saharensis

Binomial name
- Bondroitia saharensis (Santschi, 1923)

= Bondroitia saharensis =

Species of ant native to Niger

Bondroitia saharensis is a species of ant native to Niger. One of the only two species of its genus, little has been documented about this species since its discovery in 1923.

== Identification ==
Bondroitia saharensis is known to be similar in appearance and biology to the only other species in its genus. However, unlike B. lujae, B. saharensis has only ever been identified by its queen and male castes.

== Distribution ==
This species has only been documented within the African country of Niger.

== See also ==
- Bondroitia lujae
- Wildlife of Niger
