= Oxyepoecus bidentatus =

Scientific classification
- Domain: Eukaryota
- Kingdom: Animalia
- Phylum: Arthropoda
- Class: Insecta
- Order: Hymenoptera
- Family: Formicidae
- Subfamily: Myrmicinae
- Genus: Oxyepoecus
- Species: O. bidentatus

Binomial name
- Oxyepoecus bidentatus Delsinne & Mackay, 2011

Species of ant

Oxyepoecus bidentatus is a Neotropical species of ant in the genus Oxyepoecus. The species is only known from workers from Paraguay.

== Distribution ==
Oxyepoecus bidentatus is known from three localities of the Paraguayan dry Chaco. Because the maximal distance between localities was 340 km, O. bidentatus is suspected to be widely distributed in xeromorphic Chacoan forests, even if rarely found.

== Description ==
Its worker morphology places the species within the rastratus species-group. Oxyepoecus bidentatus is the only species of the genus to have both the dorsal surface of the head entirely covered by sculpture and a bidentate subpostpetiolar process. The anterior subpostpetiolar process of O. bruchi of the vezenyii species-group is also prominent and bidentate, but the dorsal surface of the head is mainly smooth and shining except for two patches of fine, longitudinal rugulae which do not reach posteriorly to the vertex margin nor laterally to the compound eye. Criteria separating O. bidentatus from other species of the rastratus species-group are the mesopleuron and lateropropodeum covered by longitudinal costae (and not reticulate as for O. myops, O. rosai, and O. reticulatus), and the presence of a reticulate-costulate sculpture on the dorsal surface of the head reaching posteriorly to the vertexal margin and laterally to the compound eye.

Gynes and males are unknown

== Biology ==
The fact that workers were extracted from leaf litter (Winkler method) or were collected in pitfall samples, while no gynes were found, suggests that this species nests in the soil, but workers forage in the leaf litter when abiotic conditions are favorable. Localities where the species was found have a mean annual rainfall and temperature ranging from 593 to 887 mm and from 23 to 25 °C, respectively.
