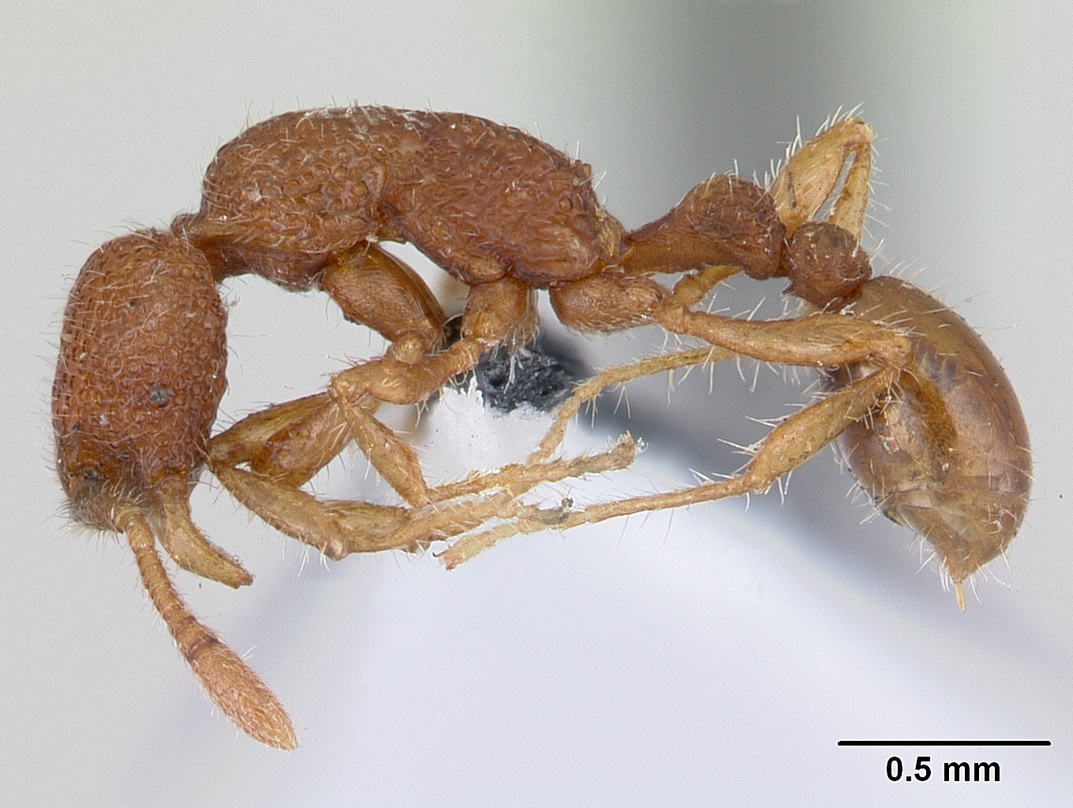
- T. dux holotype worker from India

Scientific classification
- Kingdom: Animalia
- Phylum: Arthropoda
- Class: Insecta
- Order: Hymenoptera
- Family: Formicidae
- Subfamily: Myrmicinae
- Tribe: Solenopsidini
- Genus: Tyrannomyrmex; Fernández, 2003

Type species
- Tyrannomyrmex rex Fernández, 2003

Diversity
- 4 species

= Tyrannomyrmex =

Genus of ants

Tyrannomyrmex is a rare tropical genus of ants in the subfamily Myrmicinae. Three similar species, only known from workers, are recognized and share small eyes and edentate mandibles.

== Species ==
Two of the species are known only from single worker specimens, but a single male specimen collected in 1965 possibly represents the male of an otherwise unknown species, and T. alii is known from a series of over 35 gynes and workers. So far, all species of Tyrannomyrmex occur in tropical Old World forests. The wide distribution range from India and Sri Lanka in the west to peninsular Malaysia and perhaps the Philippine archipelago in the east suggests that more species may be discovered.

- Tyrannomyrmex alii Sadasivan & Kripakaran, 2017 - Western Ghats, India
- Tyrannomyrmex dux Borowiec, 2007 – Kerala, India
- Tyrannomyrmex legatus Alpert, 2013 – Sinharaja Forest Reserve, Sri Lanka
- Tyrannomyrmex rex Fernández, 2003 – Negri Sembilan, Malaysia

== Taxonomy ==
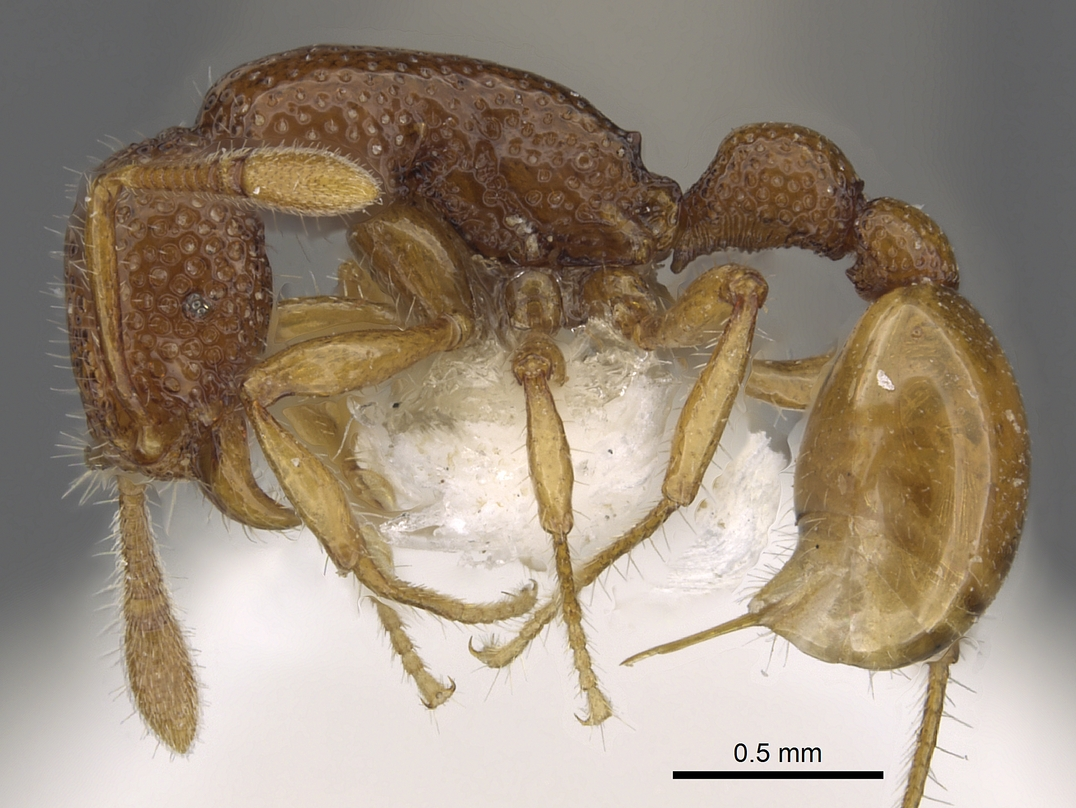
Holotype of a T. rex

In 2003, Fernández described a new genus and species, Tyrannomyrmex rex, from peninsular Malaysia based on a single specimen collected from leaf litter at Negri Sembilan, Pasoh Forest Reserve in 1994. Fernández was unable to place the new genus in any existing myrmicine tribe although several potential candidates were considered including the Adelomyrmecini and Solenopsidini. Without additional specimens or molecular data this genus was temporarily placed as incertae sedis within the subfamily Myrmicinae. A second species, T. dux, was described by Borowiec (2007) based on a single specimen collected from leaf litter in southern India in 1999. A single worker of a third species, T. legatus, described Alpert (2013) was collected in 2006 from leaf litter in a lowland dipterocarp undisturbed forest in southern Sri Lanka. This species is generally similar to the two previously described species of Tyrannomyrmex.

Fernández (2003) provisionally concluded that Tyrannomyrmex is a distinct and isolated myrmicine genus with possible affinities to either the Adelomyrmex-genus group or the tribe Solenopsidini. Alpert (2013), based on Bolton's (2003) lists of character states for all ant genera, placed the genus within Solenopsidini and close to the genus Monomorium.

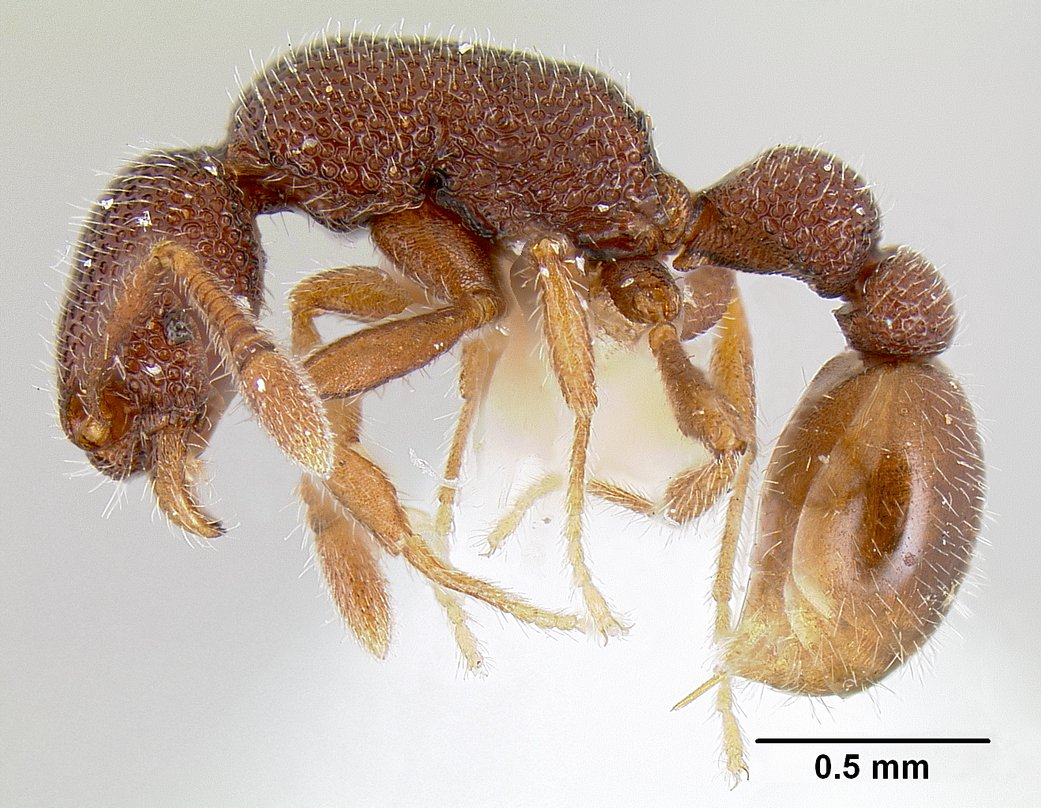
holotype of T. legatus

== Description ==
All species have small eyes reduced to a few ommatidia, an 11-segmented antenna with an ill-defined 3-segmented club, palpal formula 2-2, and a masticatory border largely edentate with two apical teeth. The small eyes, edentate mandibles, and close similarity among the workers of all three Tyrannomyrmex species strongly suggest that they may also be similar ecologically, and that they are probably subterranean and predaceous. While the three known worker specimens have been taken in leaf litter samples, the rarity of collections suggests that Tyrannomyrmex species may both nest and forage in the deeper soil horizons, and that foragers may only occasionally enter the leaf litter layers closer to the surface.

=== Morphological characters ===
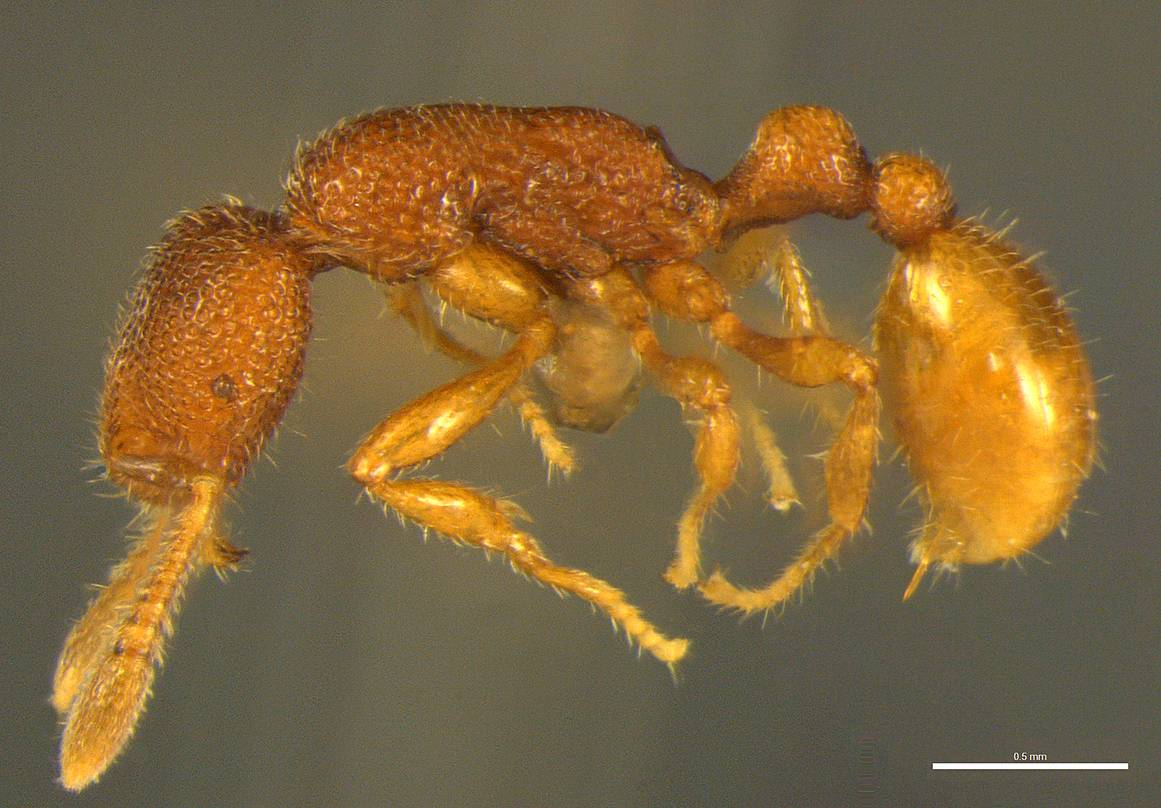
holotype of T. alii

Alpert (2013) summarized the morphological characters for the genus as follows:

- Mandibles with two teeth in the masticatory border, apical and smaller subapical. No teeth on the basal margin of the mandible.
- Inner ventral margin of masticatory border of mandibles with setae. Setae can be normal or modified.
- Clypeus devoid of carinae. Foveolae may be present.
- Palpal formula 2, 2.
- Compound eyes small, reduced to a few ommatidia.
- Antennae 11-segmented with an ill-defined 3-segmented club.
- Frontal carinae and antennal scrobes absent.
- Mesosoma without promesonotal suture.
- Propodeal lobes large and round.
- Sting large and robust.
