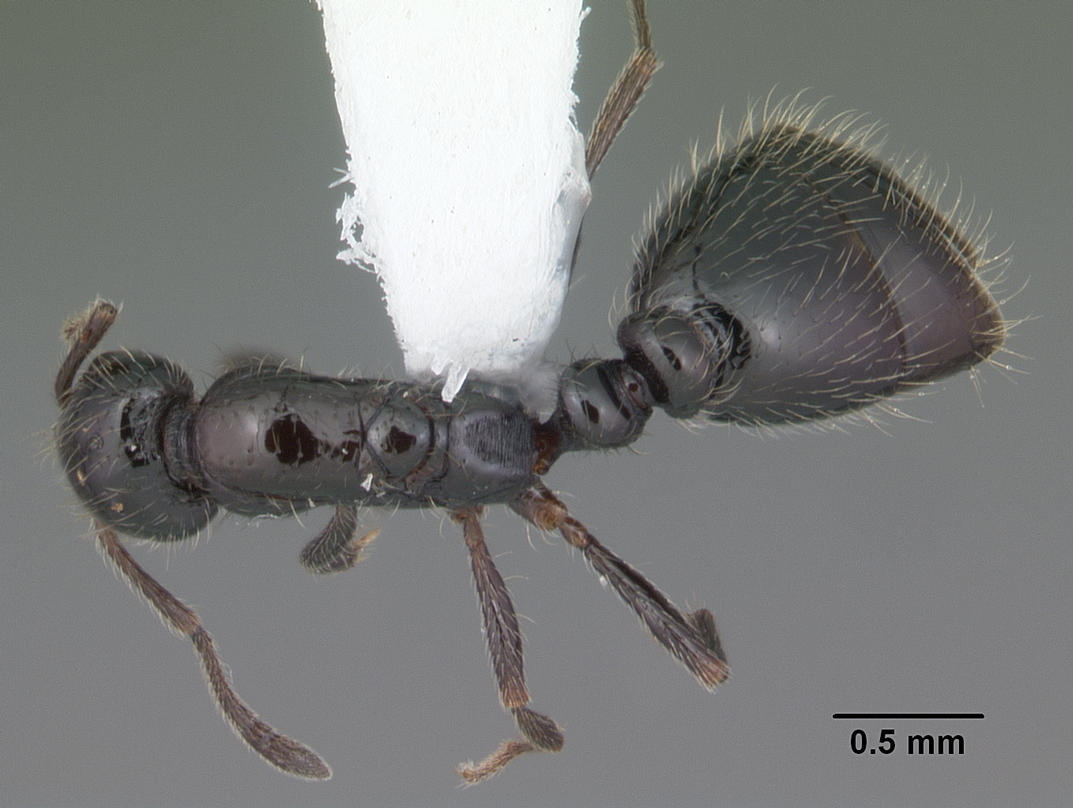

Scientific classification
- Domain: Eukaryota
- Kingdom: Animalia
- Phylum: Arthropoda
- Class: Insecta
- Order: Hymenoptera
- Family: Formicidae
- Subfamily: Myrmicinae
- Tribe: Solenopsidini
- Genus: Monomorium
- Species: M. trageri

Binomial name
- Monomorium trageri DuBois, 1986

= Monomorium trageri =

Species of ant

Monomorium trageri is a species of ant in the family Formicidae.

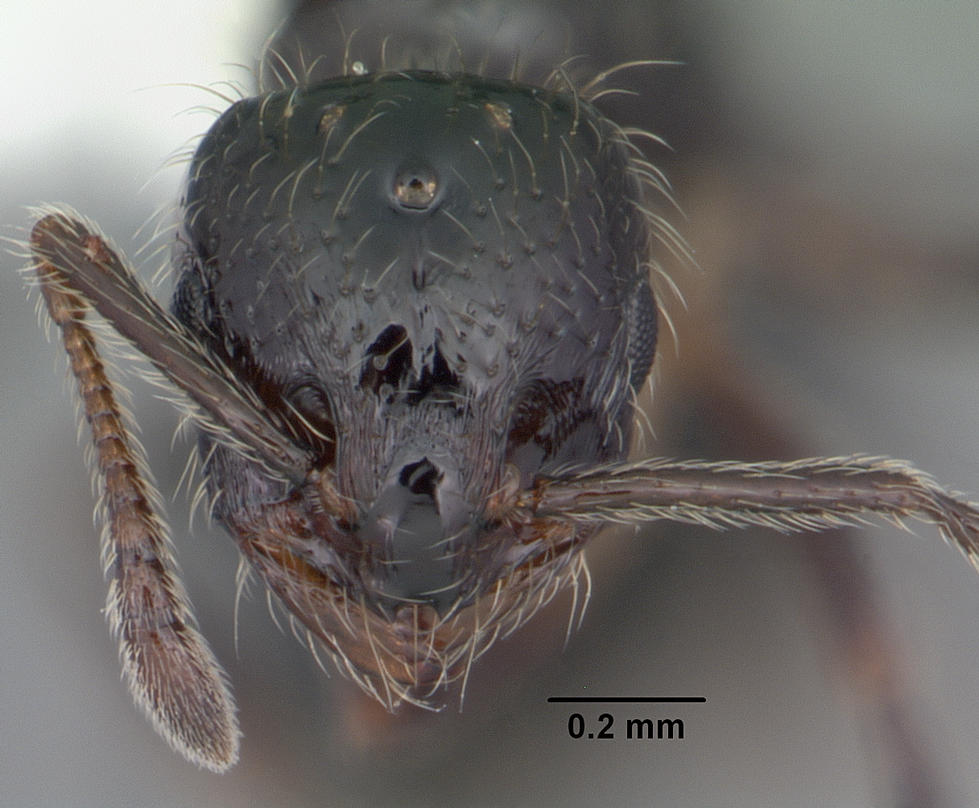

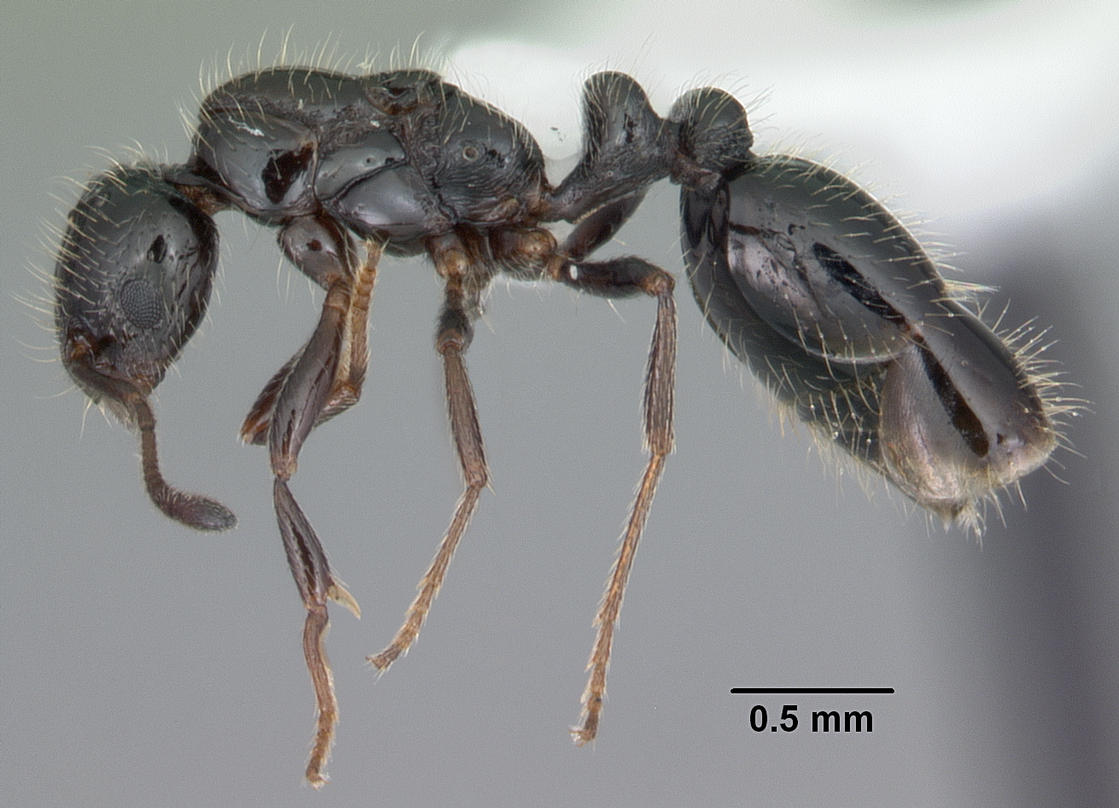
