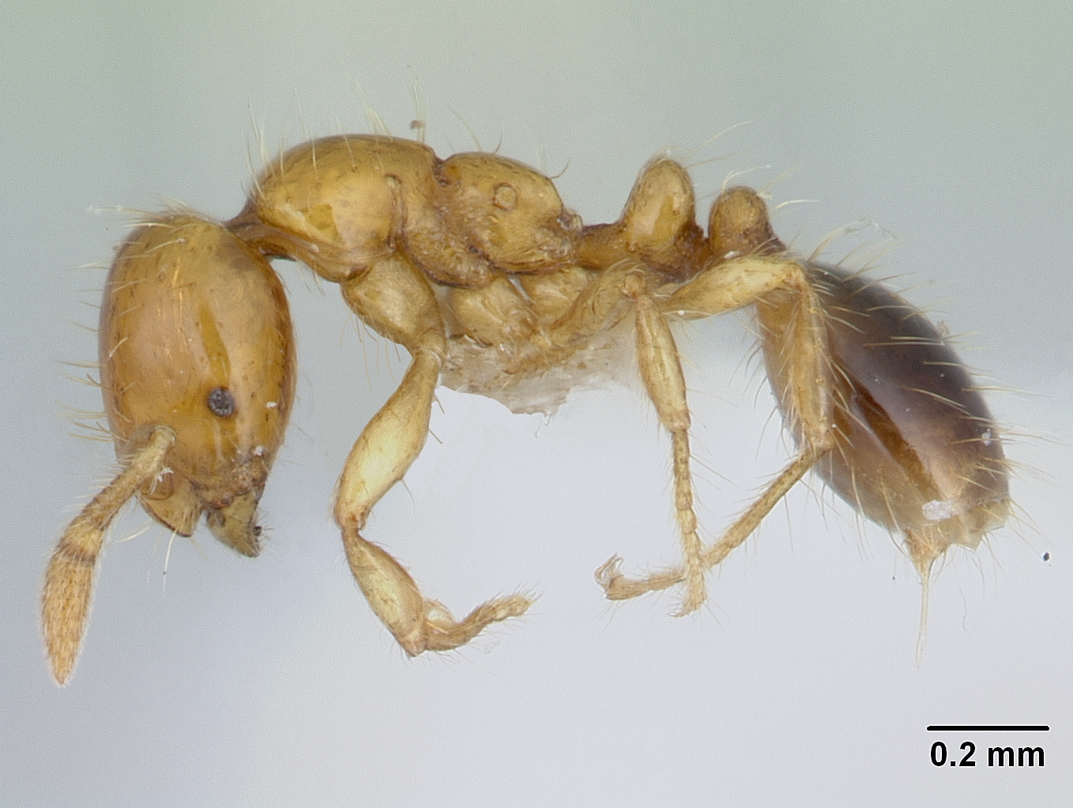
- C. bicolor worker from Venezuela

Scientific classification
- Kingdom: Animalia
- Phylum: Arthropoda
- Class: Insecta
- Order: Hymenoptera
- Family: Formicidae
- Subfamily: Myrmicinae
- Tribe: Solenopsidini
- Genus: Carebarella; Emery, 1906

Type species
- Carebarella bicolor

= Carebarella =

Genus of ants

Carebarella is a genus of ant in the subfamily Myrmicinae.

== Species ==
- Carebarella alvarengai Kempf, 1975
- Carebarella bicolor Emery, 1906
- Carebarella condei Borgmeier, 1937
