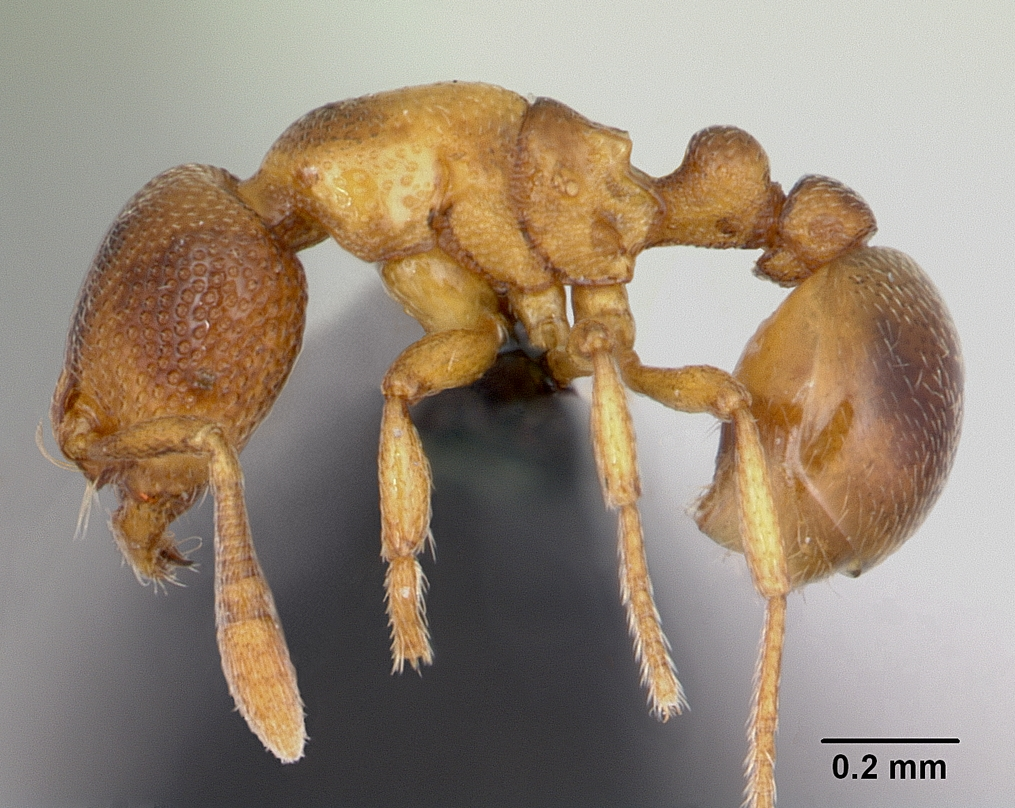
- Baracidris sitra worker

Scientific classification
- Domain: Eukaryota
- Kingdom: Animalia
- Phylum: Arthropoda
- Class: Insecta
- Order: Hymenoptera
- Family: Formicidae
- Subfamily: Myrmicinae
- Tribe: Solenopsidini
- Genus: Baracidris; Bolton, 1981

Type species
- Baracidris meketra Bolton, 1981

Diversity
- 3 species

= Baracidris =

Genus of ants

Baracidris is a genus of ants in the subfamily Myrmicinae. The genus is known from central and western Africa.

== Species ==
- Baracidris meketra Bolton, 1981
- Baracidris pilosa Fernández, 2003
- Baracidris sitra Bolton, 1981
