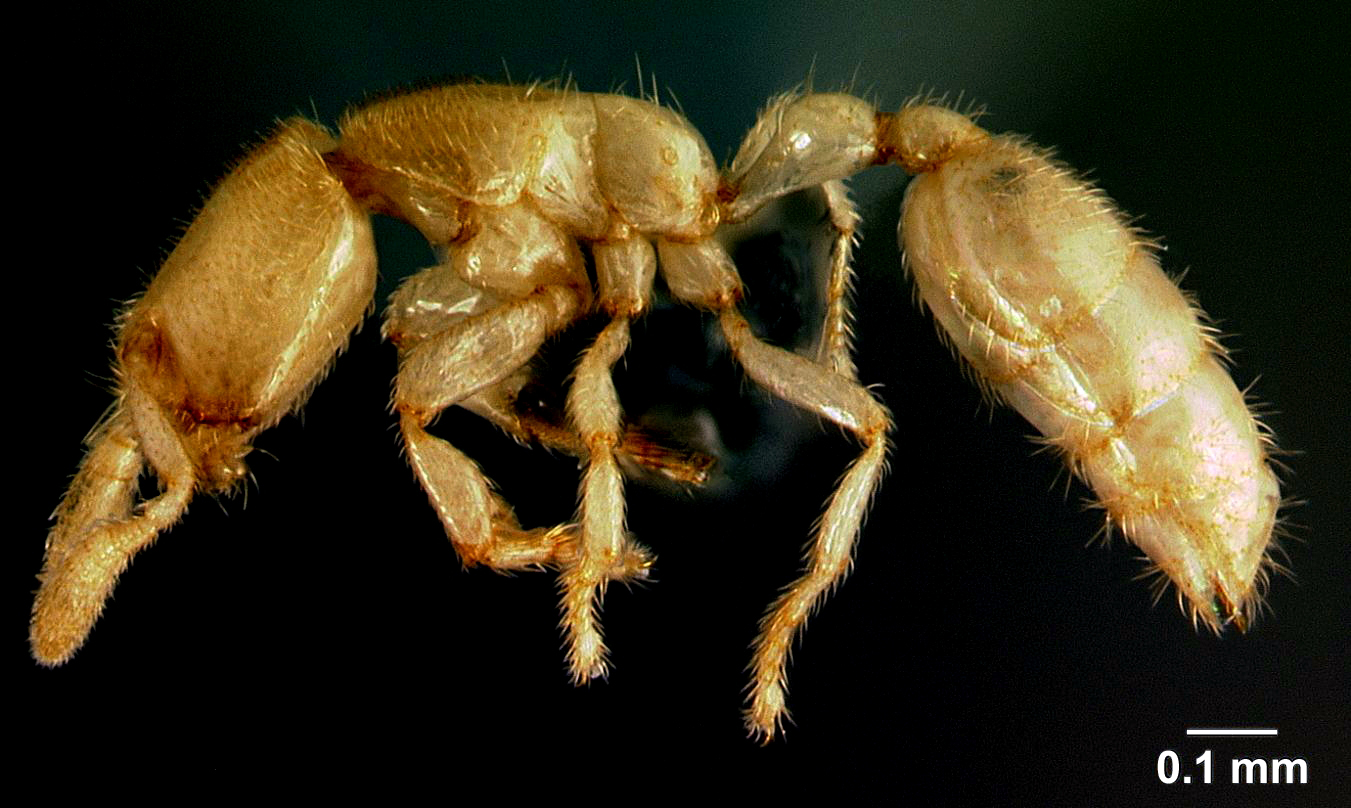

Scientific classification
- Kingdom: Animalia
- Phylum: Arthropoda
- Clade: Pancrustacea
- Class: Insecta
- Order: Hymenoptera
- Family: Formicidae
- Subfamily: Myrmicinae
- Genus: Anillomyrma
- Species: A. decamera

Binomial name
- Anillomyrma decamera (Emery, 1901)

= Anillomyrma decamera =

Species of ant

Anillomyrma decamera is an Asian species of ant in the subfamily Myrmicinae found from Philippines, India, Sri Lanka, Taiwan, Vietnam, and China.

== Subspecies ==
- Anillomyrma decamera continentis Wheeler, W.M., 1927
- Anillomyrma decamera decamera (Emery, 1901)
