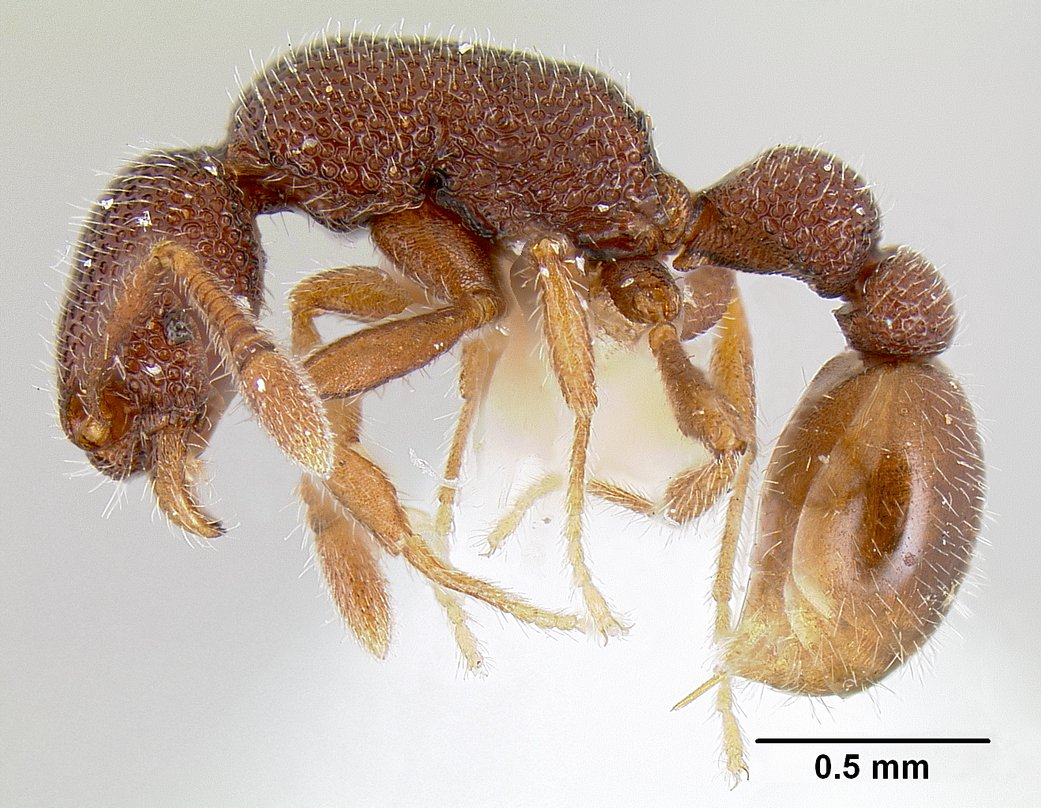

Scientific classification
- Domain: Eukaryota
- Kingdom: Animalia
- Phylum: Arthropoda
- Class: Insecta
- Order: Hymenoptera
- Family: Formicidae
- Subfamily: Myrmicinae
- Genus: Tyrannomyrmex
- Species: T. legatus

Binomial name
- Tyrannomyrmex legatus Alpert, 2013

= Tyrannomyrmex legatus =

Species of ant

Tyrannomyrmex legatus is a tropical Old World species of ants in the subfamily Myrmicinae. It is only known from a single worker from Sri Lanka. Gynes and males are unknown.

== Distribution and habitat ==
This single specimen was collected from leaf litter in lowland dipterocarp forest in southern Sri Lanka, near a stream at the bottom of a slope in the drier period of the year.

== Description ==
T. legatus is most easily distinguished from T. rex and T. dux by differences in pilosity, sculpture and the shape of the petiole and postpetiole. T. rex is almost lacking pilosity on the mesosomal dorsum, while the whole dorsal surface is covered with long erect hairs in T. legatus and T. dux. The foveolation is weaker in T. rex, especially on the mesosoma where the foveae on the mesosoma are small with most interspaces equal or wider than their diameter. T. legatus can be most easily separated from T. dux by the shape of the petiole, which is much more robust in the former. In lateral view, the peduncle of the petiole is not clearly differentiated, with an abrupt anterior slope of the node. There is also a conspicuous antereoventral projection of the petiole in T. legatus which is absent in T. dux.

Tyrannomyrmex legatus has its sting extruded and it is comparable in length with T. dux. It is possible that a fully extruded sting could appear to be longer as in T. rex. The palp formula is 2,2 and each segment is rather short. The setae on the ventral margin of the mandibles are normal. There is no median seta on the anterior margin of the clypeus, but rather a series of evenly spaced setae along the entire margin.

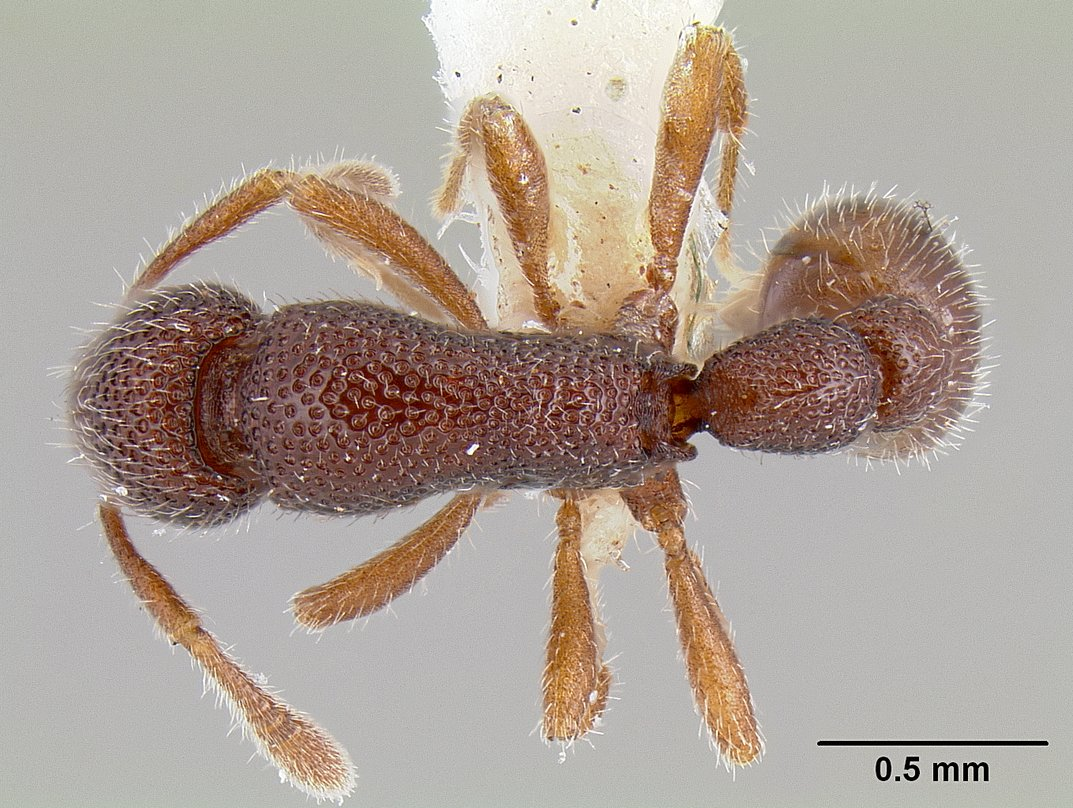
The dorsal view of a museum specimen
