= Austromorium hetericki =

Scientific classification
- Kingdom: Animalia
- Phylum: Arthropoda
- Class: Insecta
- Order: Hymenoptera
- Family: Formicidae
- Subfamily: Myrmicinae
- Genus: Austromorium
- Species: A. hetericki

Binomial name
- Austromorium hetericki Shattuck, 2009

Species of ant

Austromorium hetericki is an Australian species of ant in the genus Austromorium. It is only found in Western Australia. Little is known about their biology.
