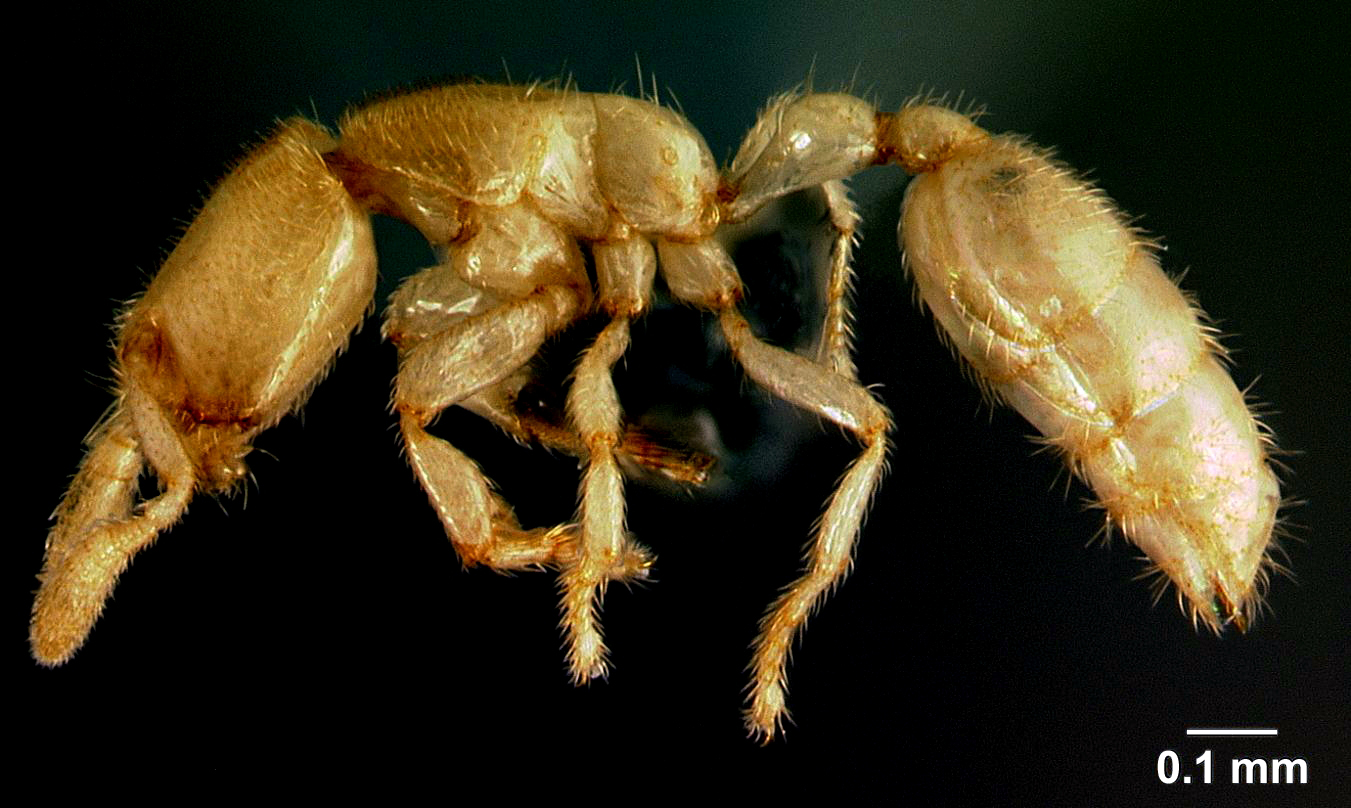
- Anillomyrma decamera worker from Vietnam

Scientific classification
- Domain: Eukaryota
- Kingdom: Animalia
- Phylum: Arthropoda
- Class: Insecta
- Order: Hymenoptera
- Family: Formicidae
- Subfamily: Myrmicinae
- Tribe: Solenopsidini
- Genus: Anillomyrma; Emery, 1913

Type species
- Monomorium decamerum

Diversity
- 2 species

= Anillomyrma =

Genus of ants

Anillomyrma is an Asian genus of ants in the subfamily Myrmicinae.

== Distribution and habitat ==
Its two species are distributed in south, southeast and East Asia. A. decamera is known from Sri Lanka, India, Vietnam and China, and A. tridens from east Malaysia. Both species are likely subterranean and have been collected deep in sandy soil or on the ground of sandy areas, which may suggest that the distribution is affected by soil type.

== Species ==
- Anillomyrma decamera (Emery, 1901)
- Anillomyrma tridens Bolton, 1987
