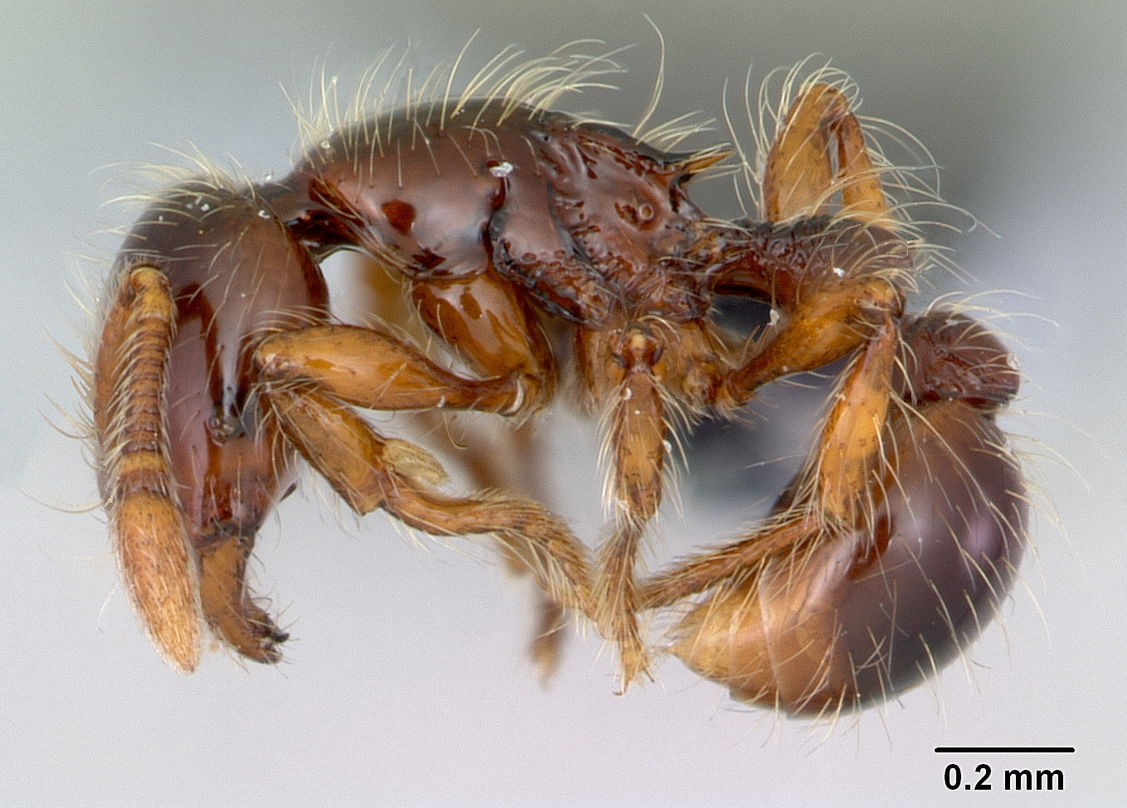
- Cryptomyrmex longinodus worker

Scientific classification
- Domain: Eukaryota
- Kingdom: Animalia
- Phylum: Arthropoda
- Class: Insecta
- Order: Hymenoptera
- Family: Formicidae
- Subfamily: Myrmicinae
- Tribe: Solenopsidini
- Genus: Cryptomyrmex; Fernández, 2004

Type species
- Adelomyrmex longinodus Fernández, 2003

Diversity
- 2 species

= Cryptomyrmex =

Genus of ants

Cryptomyrmex is a genus of ant in the subfamily Myrmicinae. The genus is known from Brazil and Paraguay.

== Species ==
- Cryptomyrmex boltoni (Fernández, 2003)
- Cryptomyrmex longinodus (Fernández, 2003)
