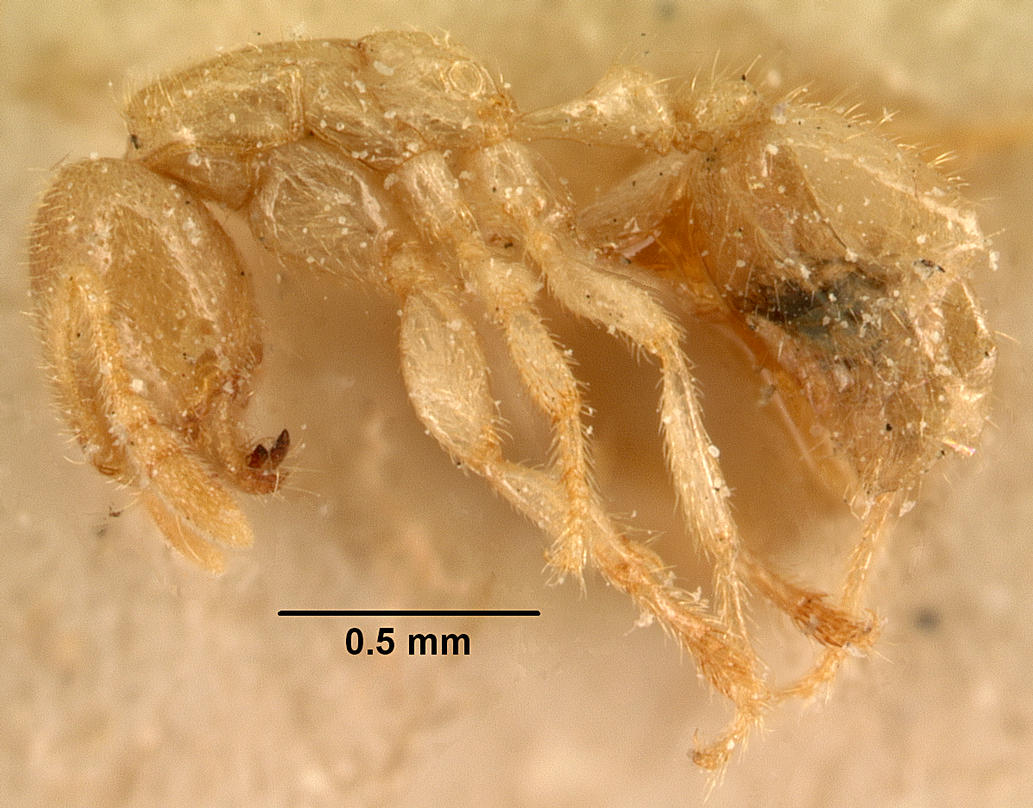
- Bondroitia lujae worker

Scientific classification
- Domain: Eukaryota
- Kingdom: Animalia
- Phylum: Arthropoda
- Class: Insecta
- Order: Hymenoptera
- Family: Formicidae
- Subfamily: Myrmicinae
- Tribe: Solenopsidini
- Genus: Bondroitia; Forel, 1911

Type species
- Monomorium coecum Forel, 1911

Diversity
- 2 species

= Bondroitia =

Genus of ants

Bondroitia is a small genus of ants in the subfamily Myrmicinae. Its two species are from Africa.

== Species ==
- Bondroitia lujae (Forel, 1909)
- Bondroitia saharensis (Santschi, 1923)
