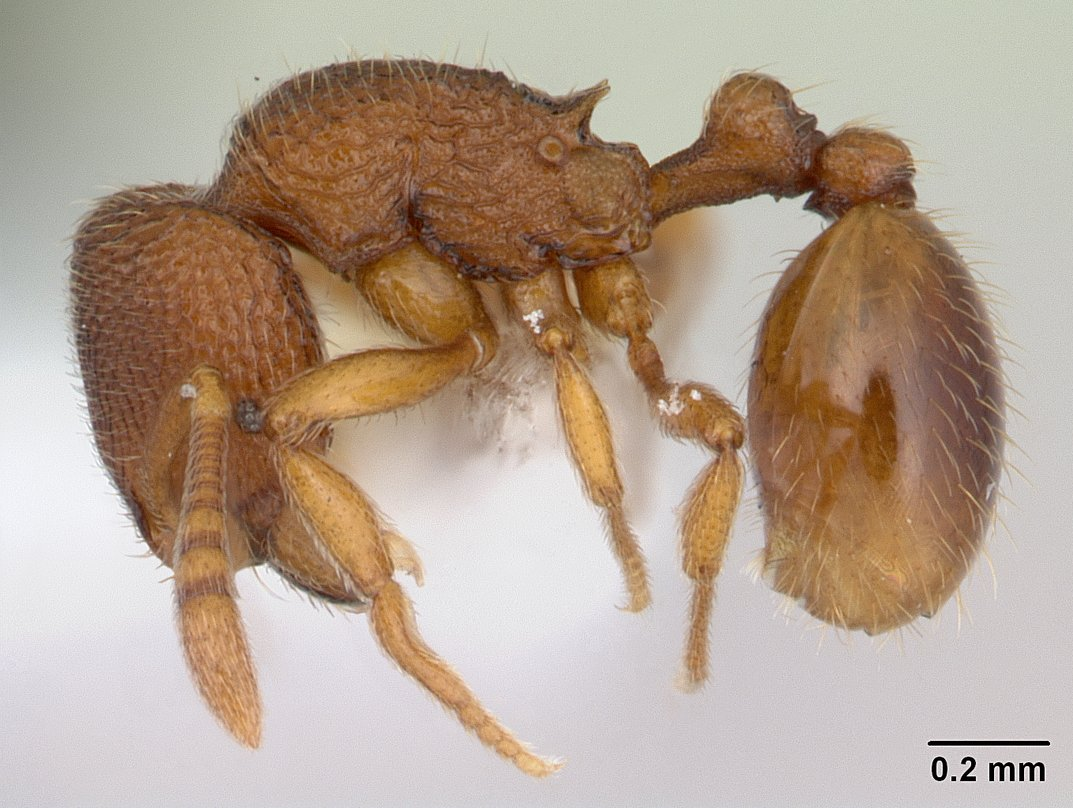
- R. innotabilis worker from Mexico

Scientific classification
- Kingdom: Animalia
- Phylum: Arthropoda
- Clade: Pancrustacea
- Class: Insecta
- Order: Hymenoptera
- Family: Formicidae
- Subfamily: Myrmicinae
- Tribe: Solenopsidini
- Genus: Rogeria; Emery, 1894

Type species
- Rogeria curvipubens

Diversity
- 40 species

= Rogeria (ant) =

Genus of ants

Rogeria is a genus of ants in the subfamily Myrmicinae. Species of the genus are known from the Americas (from southwestern United States to Argentina), Pacific (Tahiti to New Guinea), and the Caribbean. Little is known about their biology.

== Species ==
- Rogeria alzatei Kugler, 1994
- Rogeria belti Mann, 1922
- Rogeria besucheti Kugler, 1994
- Rogeria blanda (Smith, 1858)
- Rogeria bruchi Santschi, 1922
- Rogeria brunnea Santschi, 1930
- Rogeria carinata Kugler, 1994
- Rogeria ciliosa Kugler, 1994
- Rogeria cornuta Kugler, 1994
- Rogeria creightoni Snelling, 1973
- Rogeria cuneola Kugler, 1994
- Rogeria curvipubens Emery, 1894
- Rogeria exsulans Wilson & Taylor, 1967
- Rogeria foreli Emery, 1894
- Rogeria germaini Emery, 1894
- Rogeria gibba Kugler, 1994
- Rogeria inermis Mann, 1922
- Rogeria innotabilis Kugler, 1994
- Rogeria lacertosa Kempf, 1963
- Rogeria leptonana Kugler, 1994
- Rogeria lirata Kugler, 1994
- Rogeria megastigmatica Kugler, 1994
- Rogeria merenbergiana Kugler, 1994
- Rogeria micromma Kempf, 1961
- Rogeria minima Kusnezov, 1958
- Rogeria neilyensis Kugler, 1994
- Rogeria nevadensis Kugler, 1994
- Rogeria pellecta Kempf, 1963
- Rogeria procera Emery, 1896
- Rogeria prominula Kugler, 1994
- Rogeria scandens (Mann, 1922)
- Rogeria scobinata Kugler, 1994
- Rogeria sicaria Kempf, 1962
- Rogeria stigmatica Emery, 1897
- Rogeria subarmata (Kempf, 1961)
- Rogeria terescandens Kugler, 1994
- Rogeria tonduzi Forel, 1899
- Rogeria tribrocca Kugler, 1994
- Rogeria tsumani LaPolla & Sosa-Calvo, 2006
- Rogeria unguispina Kugler, 1994
