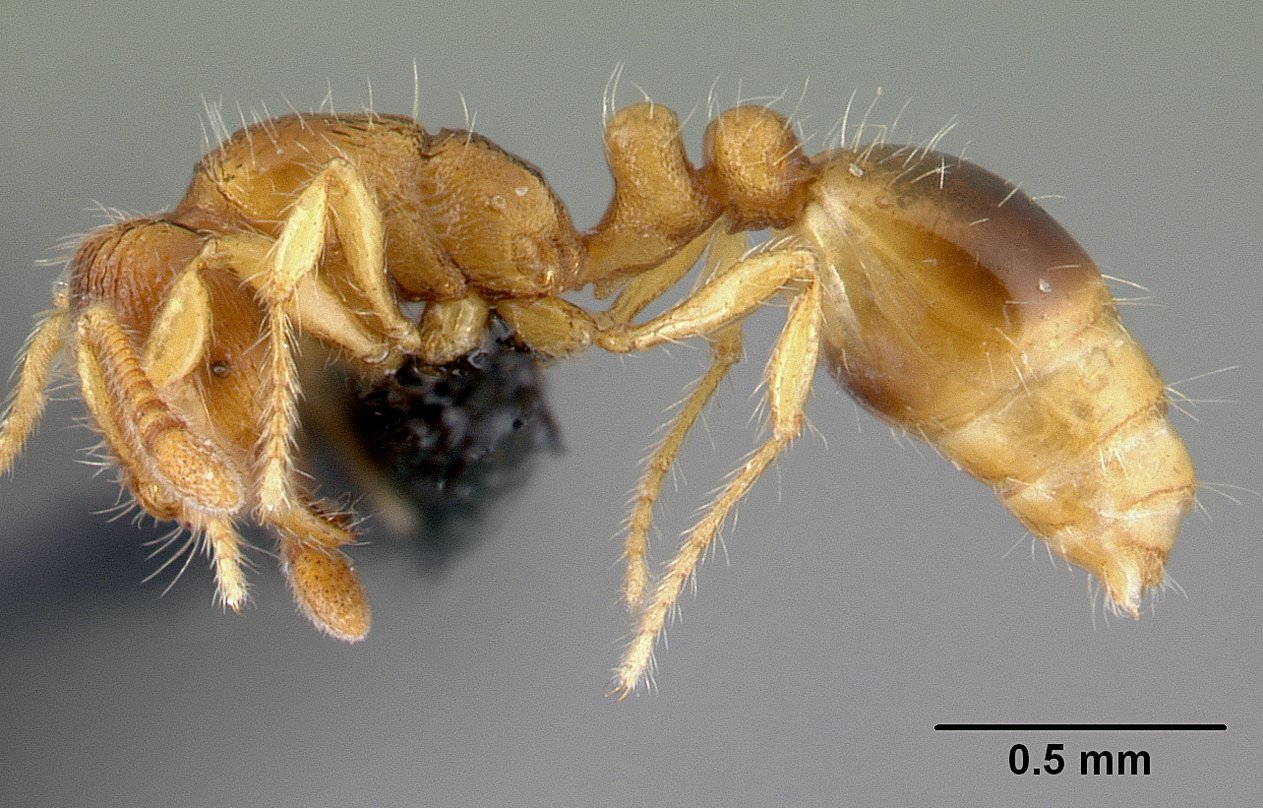
- K. inusualis AntWeb worker specimen

Scientific classification
- Kingdom: Animalia
- Phylum: Arthropoda
- Clade: Pancrustacea
- Class: Insecta
- Order: Hymenoptera
- Family: Formicidae
- Subfamily: Myrmicinae
- Tribe: Solenopsidini
- Genus: Kempfidris; Fernández, Feitosa & Lattke, 2014
- Species: K. inusualis

Binomial name
- Kempfidris inusualis Fernández, Feitosa & Lattke, 2014

Synonyms
- Monomorium inusuale Fernández, 2007 (type species of Kempfidris)

= Kempfidris =

Genus of ants

Kempfidris is a Neotropical genus of ants in the subfamily Myrmicinae containing the single species Kempfidris inusualis. Known from Brazil, Ecuador and Venezuela, the species was originally described as Monomorium inusuale in 2007, but was reclassified as the type species for the new genus Kempfidris in 2014. The species is only known from workers and almost nothing is known about their natural history.

== Description ==
The genus was described in 2014 based on the workers of a single species, K. inusualis, originally described by Fernández (2007) and provisionally placed in Monomorium awaiting a better understanding of the internal relationships in Myrmicinae. Kempfidris has a series of distinctive morphological characters including the mandibular configuration, vestibulate propodeal spiracle, propodeal carinae, and cylindrical micro-pegs on the posteromedian portion of abdominal tergum VI and anteromedian portion of abdominal tergum VII. This last trait appears to be autapomorphic for the genus. Queens and males are unknown.

The most outstanding feature of Kempfidris is the series of minute, hair-bearing tubercles or cylindrical pegs on the abdominal apex. Most are concentrated on the anteromedian portion of the pygidium and some on the posteromedian portion of abdominal tergite VI, a position that would coincide with the position of the pygidial gland, which opens between abdominal tergites VI and VII. The structure of the micropegs with their associated hairs also hints at some sort of glandular function, or possibly a mechano-reception function during stinging, but a more convincing explanation will only be possible after a histological study. Whatever the function of these tubercles, they appear to be an autapomorphic structure, absent in other Myrmicinae and probably in other ants as well. In ants, the most structurally similar cuticular projections can be found throughout most of the body of some species in the formicine genus Echinopla, except on the pygidium, and additionally on the gastral apex of an undescribed species of Strumigenys. Given that these aforementioned taxa are not closely related to Kempfidris, their structures are probably not homologous, but perhaps convergent evolution could be considered, especially in the case of the dacetine ant. Other specialized pygidial structures found in ants are the denticles or spines of Cerapachyinae (now Dorylinae) and the large, upward-curving teeth in Pachycondyla crassinoda workers, but their position and form are very different. Most members of the solenopsidine group are smooth, with little sculpturing, but this species presents a moderate amount of sculpturing on the head, mesosoma, petiole and postpetiole.

== Distribution ==
Kempfidris is known from Brazil, Ecuador and Venezuela. Despite the fact that this species is broadly distributed in South America, records of its occurrence are extremely scarce. Until recently, Kempfidris inusualis was known only from the type series examined by Fernández (2007) and a nest series collected in 2006. Despite its broad distribution, specimens of K. inusualis are relatively uniform in size and general aspect. The main differences regarding geographic variation involve slightly distinct propodeal shapes, such as a shorter dorsal face in the Ecuadorian specimens. Specimens from Rondônia, Brazil, differ from other conspecific workers by their darker color (almost black) and more prominent propodeal crests that form small denticles. Given the similarity among the samples examined, Fernández, Feitosa & Lattke (2014) decided to consider these morphological differences as intraspecific variation.

== Biology ==
Almost nothing is known about the natural history of K. inusualis. Most of the specimens studied were apparently obtained from leaf-litter samples. The nest series collected in the Venezuelan Amazon was obtained from a rotten stick, also harboring a termite nest, on the ground next to an airstrip. The habitat there is open scrub to low trees on white sandy soil that is seasonally flooded by dark, colored waters. All the known samples were collected between July and September, suggesting a more intense activity in this period, which coincides with the low level of the rivers in the Amazon Basin. All things considered, this could also be a collecting artifact, as the aforementioned period approximately coincides with academic holidays in many universities and represents a lower probability of conflict between lectures and field trips.
