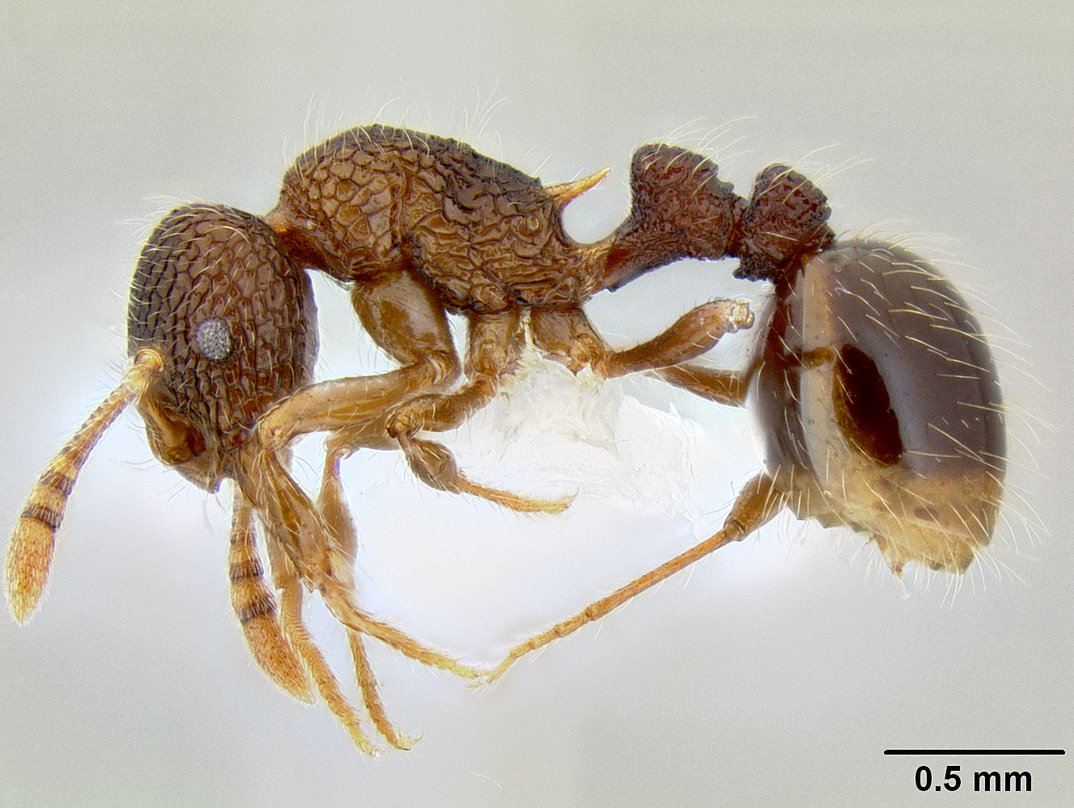

Scientific classification
- Kingdom: Animalia
- Phylum: Arthropoda
- Class: Insecta
- Order: Hymenoptera
- Family: Formicidae
- Subfamily: Myrmicinae
- Genus: Austromorium
- Species: A. flavigaster

Binomial name
- Austromorium flavigaster (Clark, 1938)

= Austromorium flavigaster =

Species of ant

Austromorium flavigaster is a species of ant belonging to the genus Austromorium. It is a common ant in Australia, and it was described by John S. Clark in 1938.
