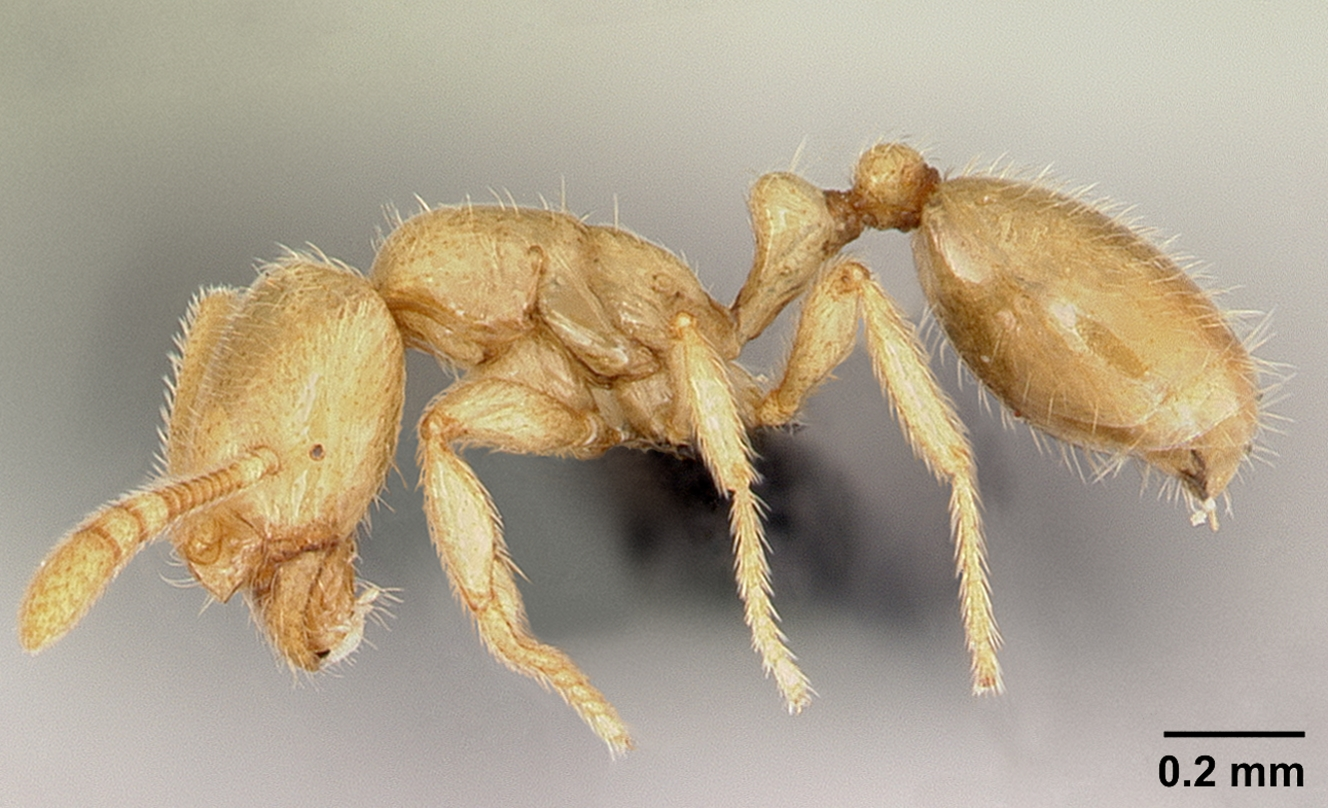
- Syllophopsis modesta

Scientific classification
- Kingdom: Animalia
- Phylum: Arthropoda
- Class: Insecta
- Order: Hymenoptera
- Family: Formicidae
- Subfamily: Myrmicinae
- Tribe: Solenopsidini
- Genus: Syllophopsis; Santschi, 1915

species
- See text

= Syllophopsis =

Genus of insects

Syllophopsis is a genus of Myrmicine ants found across the Southern Hemisphere and the tropics except South America. It was regarded as a synonym of Monomorium before Ward et al. 2015 revalidated the genus.

== Species ==
As of 2024, Syllophopsis contains 23 species.

- Syllophopsis adiastolon
- Syllophopsis aureorugosa
- Syllophopsis australica
- Syllophopsis cryptobia
- Syllophopsis dentata
- Syllophopsis elgonensis
- Syllophopsis ferodens
- Syllophopsis fisheri
- Syllophopsis gongromos
- Syllophopsis hildebrandti
- Syllophopsis infusca
- Syllophopsis jonesi
- Syllophopsis kondratieffi
- Syllophopsis malamixta
- Syllophopsis modesta
- Syllophopsis peetersi
- Syllophopsis saudiensis
- Syllophopsis sechellensis
- Syllophopsis sechellensis papuasiae
- Syllophopsis sersalata
- Syllophopsis subcoeca
- Syllophopsis thrascolepta
- Syllophopsis vitiensis
