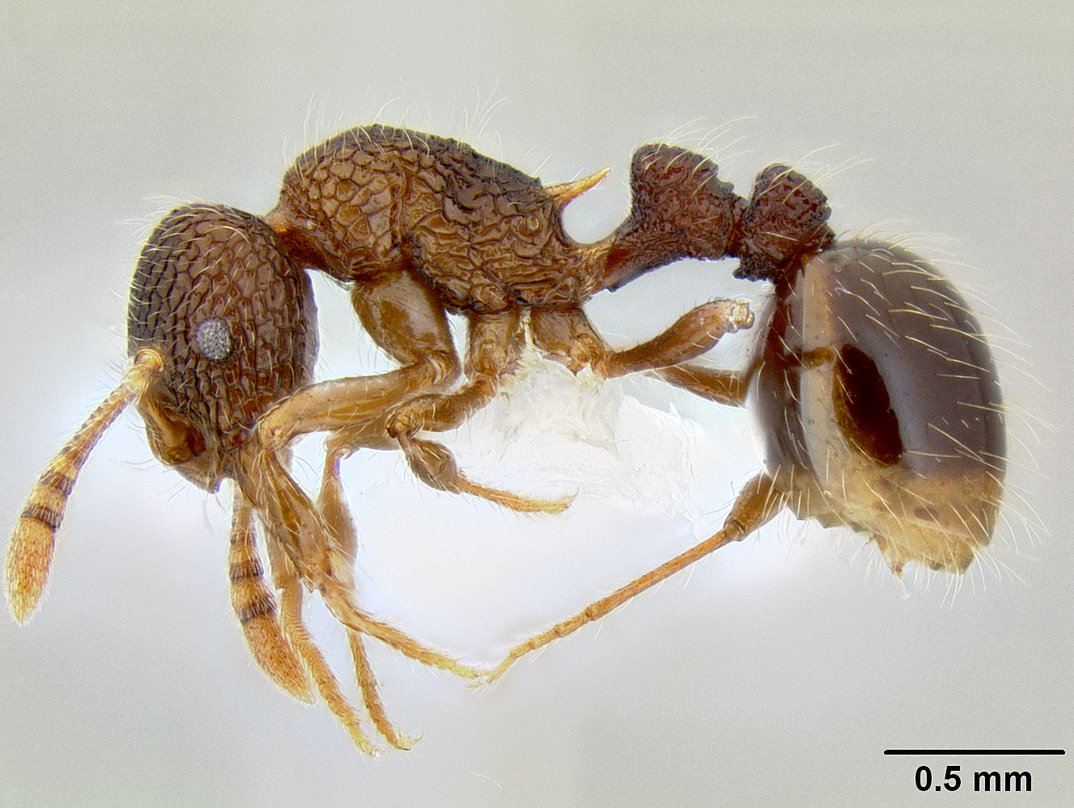
- Austromorium flavigaster

Scientific classification
- Kingdom: Animalia
- Phylum: Arthropoda
- Class: Insecta
- Order: Hymenoptera
- Family: Formicidae
- Subfamily: Myrmicinae
- Tribe: Solenopsidini
- Genus: Austromorium; Shattuck, 2009

Type species
- Xiphomyrmex flavigaster Clark, 1938

Diversity
- 2 species

= Austromorium =

Genus of ants

Austromorium is an Australian genus of ants in the subfamily Myrmicinae. The genus contains two species, one of which, Austromorium flavigaster, is fairly common and widespread in southern Australia. The other species, Austromorium hetericki, is only found in Western Australia. Little is known about their biology.

== Species ==
- Austromorium flavigaster (Clark, 1938)
- Austromorium hetericki Shattuck, 2009
