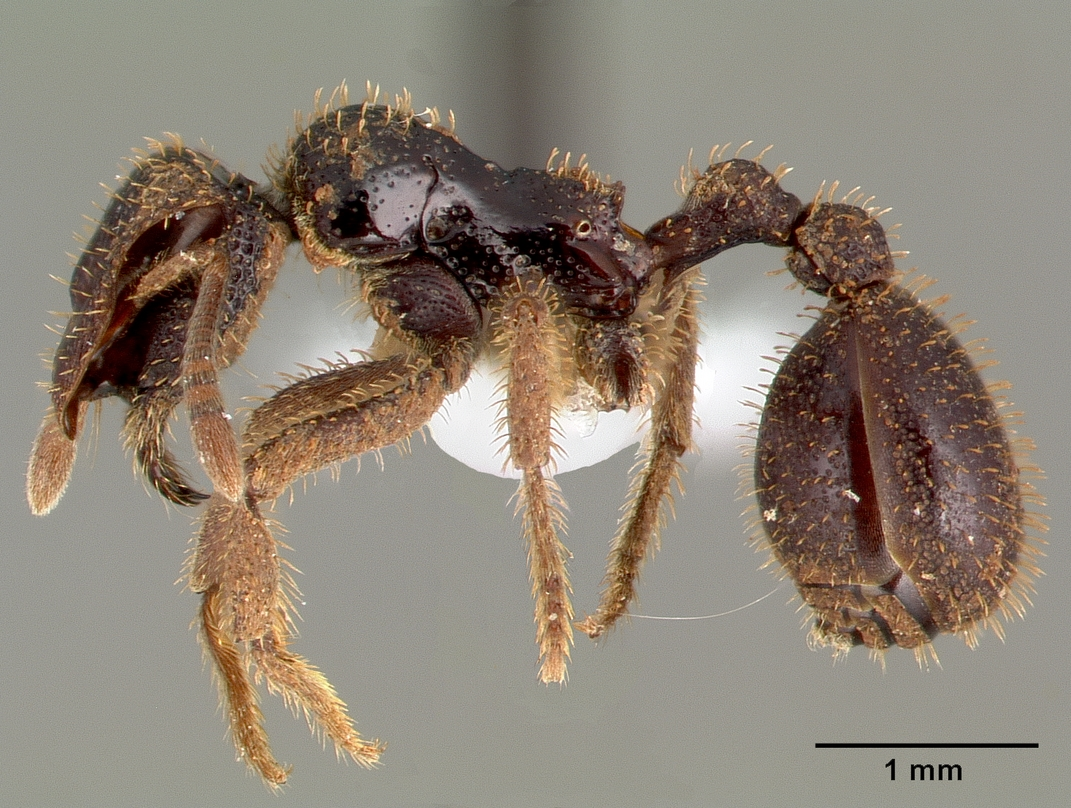
- Stegomyrmex vizottoi worker

Scientific classification
- Domain: Eukaryota
- Kingdom: Animalia
- Phylum: Arthropoda
- Class: Insecta
- Order: Hymenoptera
- Family: Formicidae
- Subfamily: Myrmicinae
- Tribe: Solenopsidini
- Genus: Stegomyrmex; Emery, 1912

Type species
- Stegomyrmex connectens Emery, 1912

Diversity
- 5 species

= Stegomyrmex =

Genus of ant

Stegomyrmex is a Neotropical genus of ants in the subfamily Myrmicinae. Strictly Neotropical in its distribution, the genus is known from Costa Rica to northern Argentina. It was once considered rare, but more recent sampling has revealed that the genus is relatively common in the leaf litter.

== Species ==
- Stegomyrmex bensoni Feitosa, Brandão & Diniz, 2008 – Brazil
- Stegomyrmex connectens Emery, 1912 – Peru and Bolivia
- Stegomyrmex manni Smith, 1946 – Costa Rica, Panama, and Colombia
- Stegomyrmex olindae Feitosa, Brandão & Diniz, 2008 – Brazil
- Stegomyrmex vizottoi Diniz, 1990 – Argentina, Paraguay and Brazil
