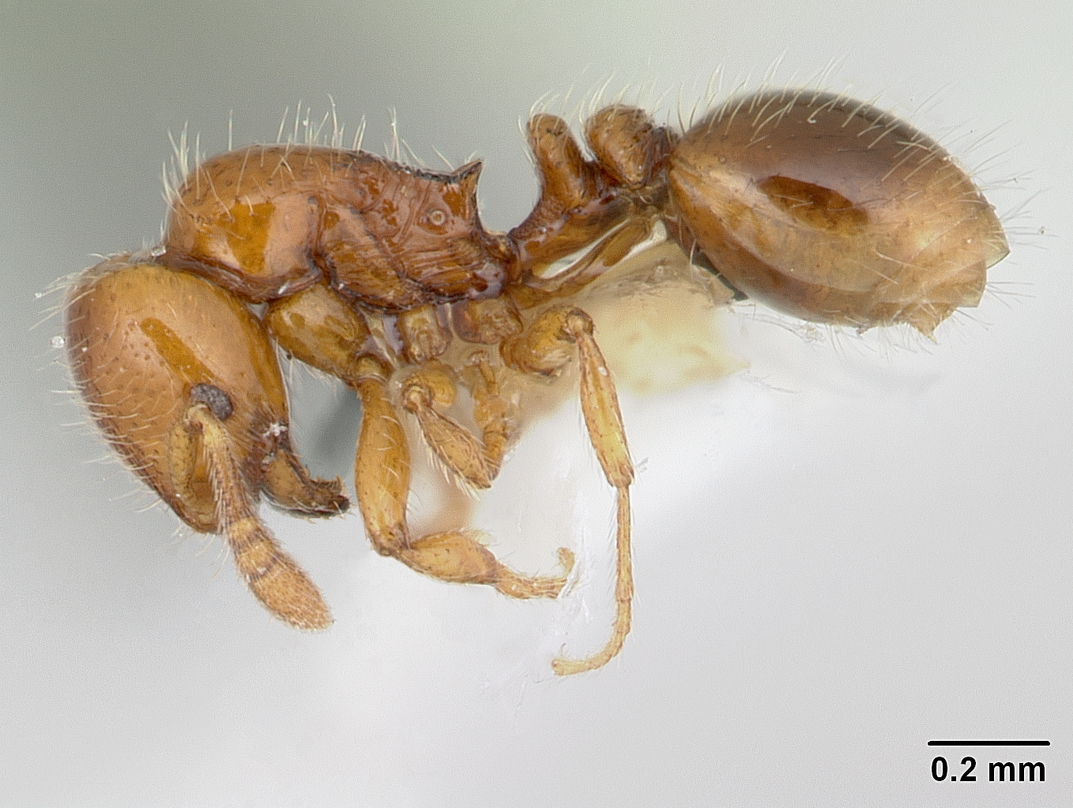
- Oxyepoecus bruchi worker from Paraguay

Scientific classification
- Kingdom: Animalia
- Phylum: Arthropoda
- Class: Insecta
- Order: Hymenoptera
- Family: Formicidae
- Subfamily: Myrmicinae
- Tribe: Solenopsidini
- Genus: Oxyepoecus; Santschi, 1926

Type species
- Oxyepoecus bruchi Santschi, 1926

Diversity
- 20 species

Synonyms
- Forelifidis Smith, 1954; Martia Forel, 1907

= Oxyepoecus =

Genus of ants

Oxyepoecus is a Neotropical genus of ant in the subfamily Myrmicinae. The genus is a member of the tribe Solenopsidini and currently includes 20 species.

== Distribution ==
The genus is known from the Neotropics, from Colombia to Chile, where it is collected infrequently.

== Identification ==
Oxyepoecus is differentiated from other Solenopsidini by the 11-segmented antennae with a three-segmented apical club, the clypeus with four teeth, and the dentate propodeum. In addition, the petiole and postpetiole nodes are high and often anteroposteriorly compressed.

== Biology ==
The biology of the genus is poorly known, but three species (O. inquilinus, O. daguerrei, and O. bruchi) are suspected to be inquilines of Pheidole or Solenopsis, although the exact nature of the relationship is unclear. These three species are considered as "Vulnerable D2" by IUCN, meaning they are suspected to be "facing a high risk of extinction in the wild in the medium-term future" because "their populations are characterized by an acute restriction in their area of occupancy (typically less than 100 km^{2}) or in the number of locations (typically fewer than five)."

== Species ==
- Oxyepoecus bidentatus Delsinne & Mackay, 2011
- Oxyepoecus browni Albuquerque & Brandão, 2004
- Oxyepoecus bruchi Santschi, 1926
- Oxyepoecus crassinodus Kempf, 1974
- Oxyepoecus daguerrei (Santschi, 1933)
- Oxyepoecus ephippiatus Albuquerque & Brandão, 2004
- Oxyepoecus inquilinus (Kusnezov, 1952)
- Oxyepoecus kempfi Albuquerque & Brandão, 2004
- Oxyepoecus longicephalus Albuquerque & Brandão, 2004
- Oxyepoecus mandibularis (Emery, 1913)
- Oxyepoecus myops Albuquerque & Brandão, 2009
- Oxyepoecus plaumanni Kempf, 1974
- Oxyepoecus punctifrons (Borgmeier, 1927)
- Oxyepoecus quadratus Albuquerque & Brandão, 2004
- Oxyepoecus rastratus (Mayr, 1887)
- Oxyepoecus reticulatus Kempf, 1974
- Oxyepoecus rosai Albuquerque & Brandão, 2009
- Oxyepoecus striatus Mackay & Delsinne, 2011
- Oxyepoecus vezenyii (Forel, 1907)
- Oxyepoecus vivax Kempf, 1974

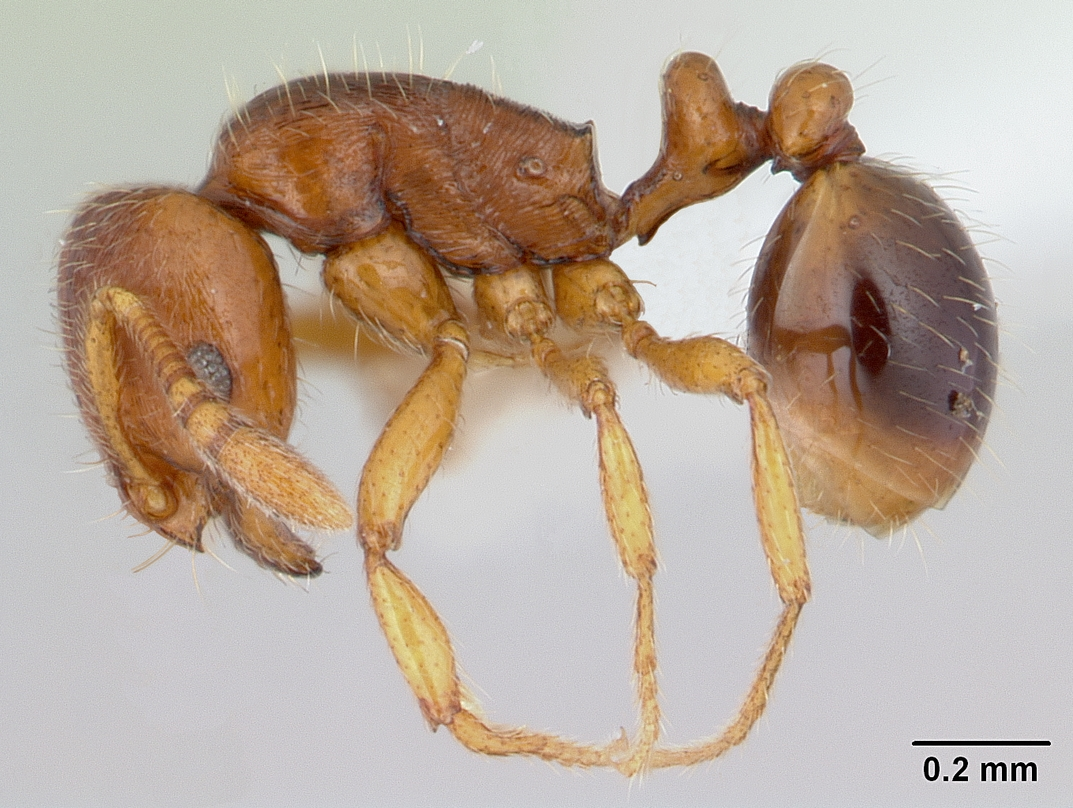
Oxyepoecus rastratus

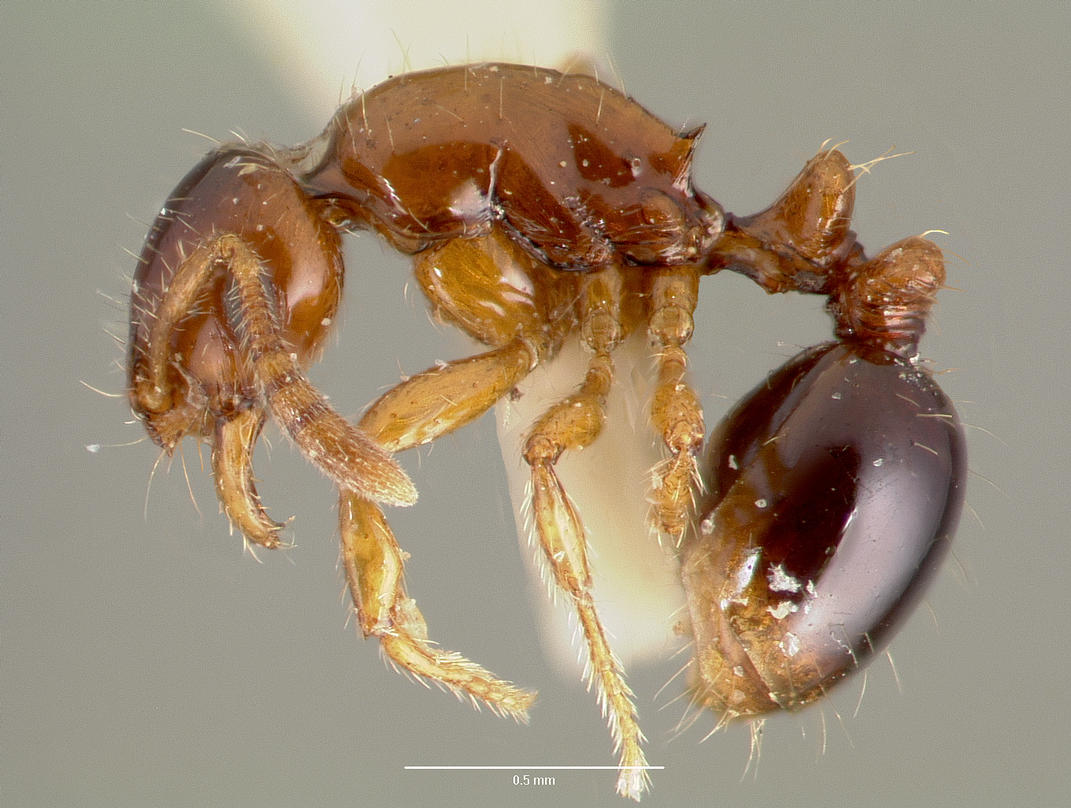
Oxyepoecus inquilinus

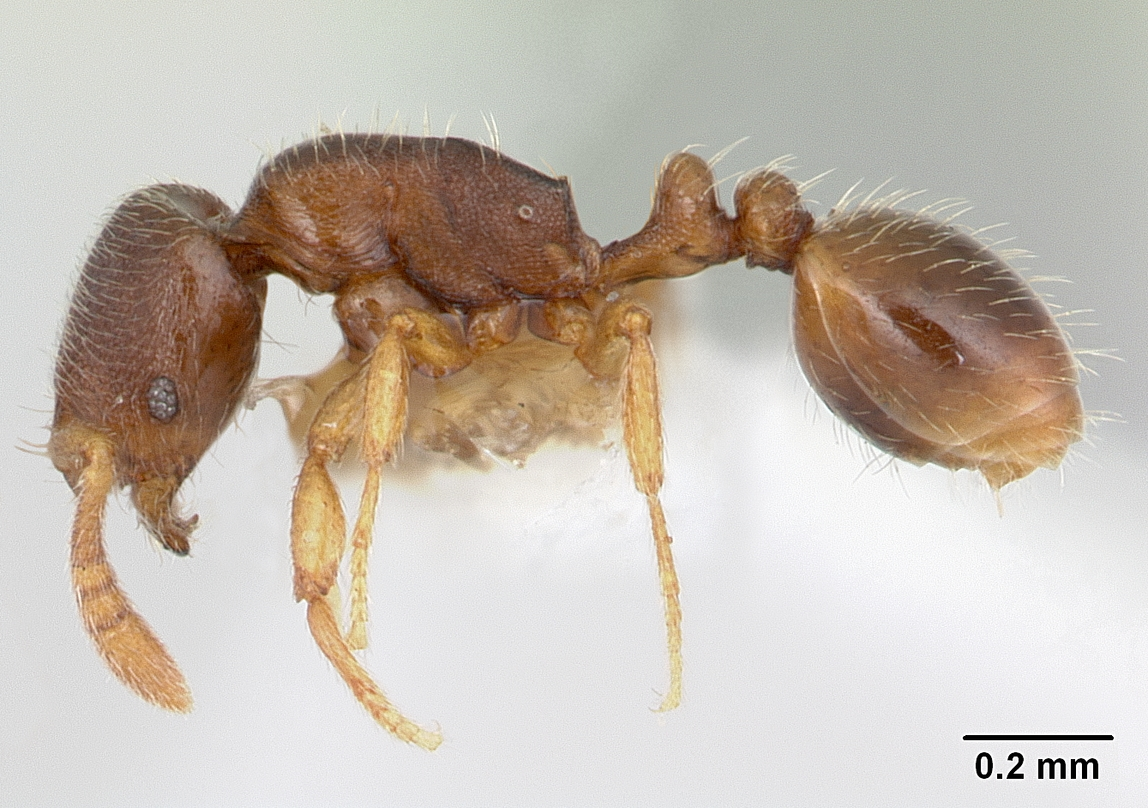
Oxyepoecus reticulatus

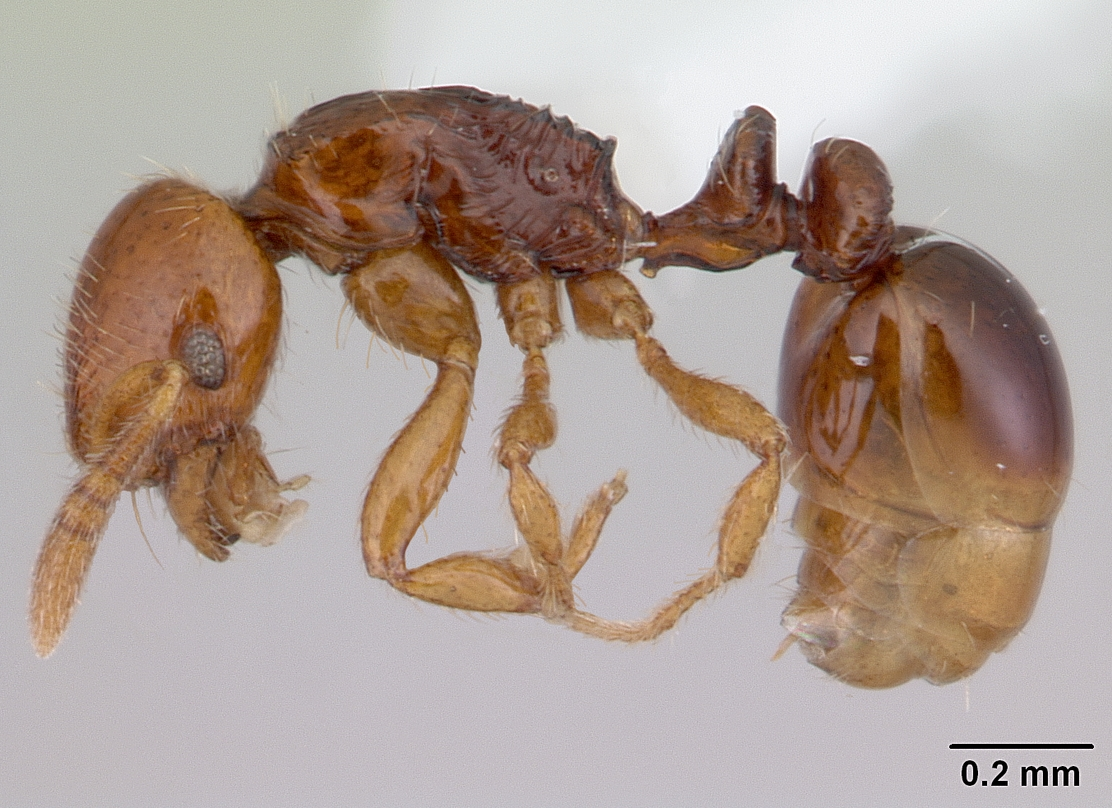
Oxyepoecus vezenyii
