= Oxyepoecus daguerrei =

Conservation status
- Vulnerable (IUCN 2.3)

Scientific classification
- Kingdom: Animalia
- Phylum: Arthropoda
- Class: Insecta
- Order: Hymenoptera
- Family: Formicidae
- Subfamily: Myrmicinae
- Genus: Oxyepoecus
- Species: O. daguerrei

Binomial name
- Oxyepoecus daguerrei (Santschi, 1933)

Species of ant

Oxyepoecus daguerrei is a species of ant in the genus Oxyepoecus. It is native to Argentina.
