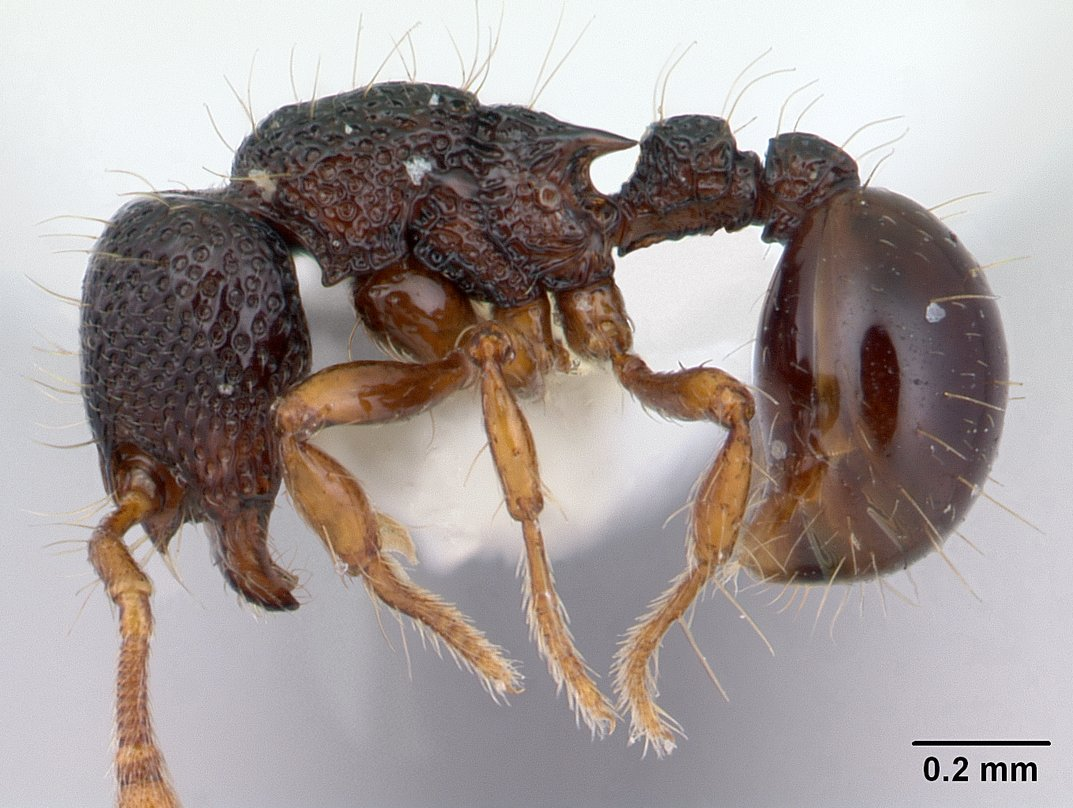
- Adelomyrmex biroi worker

Scientific classification
- Kingdom: Animalia
- Phylum: Arthropoda
- Clade: Pancrustacea
- Class: Insecta
- Order: Hymenoptera
- Family: Formicidae
- Subfamily: Myrmicinae
- Tribe: Solenopsidini
- Genus: Adelomyrmex; Emery, 1897

Type species
- Adelomyrmex biroi Emery, 1897

Diversity
- 30 species

Synonyms
- Apsychomyrmex Wheeler, 1910; Arctomyrmex Mann, 1921

= Adelomyrmex =

Genus of ants

Adelomyrmex is a genus of ants in the subfamily Myrmicinae. Species of Adelomyrmex are small, litter-inhabiting ants most often collected in Berlese and Winkler samples. Although the genus and its relatives have a pantropical distribution, Central American cloud forests are the only places where they are abundant and diverse. Including undescribed species, Adelomyrmex has 66 species as of 2023.

== Habitat and distribution ==
The center of Adelomyrmex abundance and diversity is Central America, and a few far-flung species occur in New Guinea, Samoa, Fiji, Tonga, New Caledonia, and Isla del Coco. Several Adelomyrmex species are mountain-top endemics with very restricted ranges, and climate change clearly poses the threat of mountain-top extinction. Additionally, the Seychelles contains two poorly-known yet-undescribed species, though molecular data places it sister to Cryptomyrmex boltoni rather than Neotropical Adelomyrmex.

The geographic range of the genus in the New World is (1) the mainland from northern Mexico to Amazonian Brazil; (2) the Galápagos, where the mainland species A. myops is probably recently introduced; and (3) Isla del Coco, a small oceanic island north of the Galápagos, with a highly distinctive endemic species. The genus is unknown from the Caribbean islands. The center of abundance and diversity is the Central American highlands south to western Panama. Elsewhere in the range the genus is always very rare with low local diversity.

In Central America, Adelomyrmex occur primarily in mature wet forest habitats, in rotten wood and leaf litter on the forest floor. They are far more abundant in montane cloud forest than in lowland rainforest. In some cloud forest habitats they can occur in nearly 100% of miniWinkler samples (1 m^{2} samples of sifted litter) and dozens of individuals may occur in samples. In lowland rainforest they are rare, occurring in fewer than 10% of miniWinklers, and usually as one or two individuals per sample. Highland species are typically larger as well. Thus in some cloud forests Adelomyrmex make up a large proportion of the ant biomass (often sharing that role with another dominant cloud forest myrmicine genus, Stenamma). In contrast, in lowland habitats they are very rare and a minute proportion of the biomass. In South America they are always rare, whether in lowlands or cloud forest.

== Morphology ==
Total tooth count.-4-7;Club antennal.-2 Total segment count.-12;Eyes.-2-10 omatidia;Pronotal-Mesonotal spines.-absent;Propodeal spines.-present(Dentiform); Petiolar spines.-absent;Scrobes.-absent;Metapleural gland.-present

Sting.-Present

Caste sistem.- None or Weak

Palp formula: 2,2; 1,2; 1,1

== Nests ==
Given their abundance in cloud forest Winkler samples, remarkably few nests have been observed. Small nests of A. tristani and A. paratristani are occasionally found in bits of rotten wood on the ground. The dark workers curl and lie motionless on disturbance, blending with the background debris. Only the white brood gives them away. An exception is some montane sites in Guatemala and Chiapas where A. robustus occurs. Adelomyrmex robustus can be a more conspicuous presence, with large colonies in rotten wood at forest edges. Adelomyrmex bispeculum, a species endemic to Monteverde, Costa Rica, is only known from three nest collections. These nests were in small chambers in clay soil, one beneath a stone and two in a vertical trailside bank. It is revealing that this species has not been collected in the hundreds of sifted litter samples taken in the Monteverde area, in which A. tristani is very abundant. It suggests fine-scale microsite segregation of Adelomyrmex species.

== Biology ==
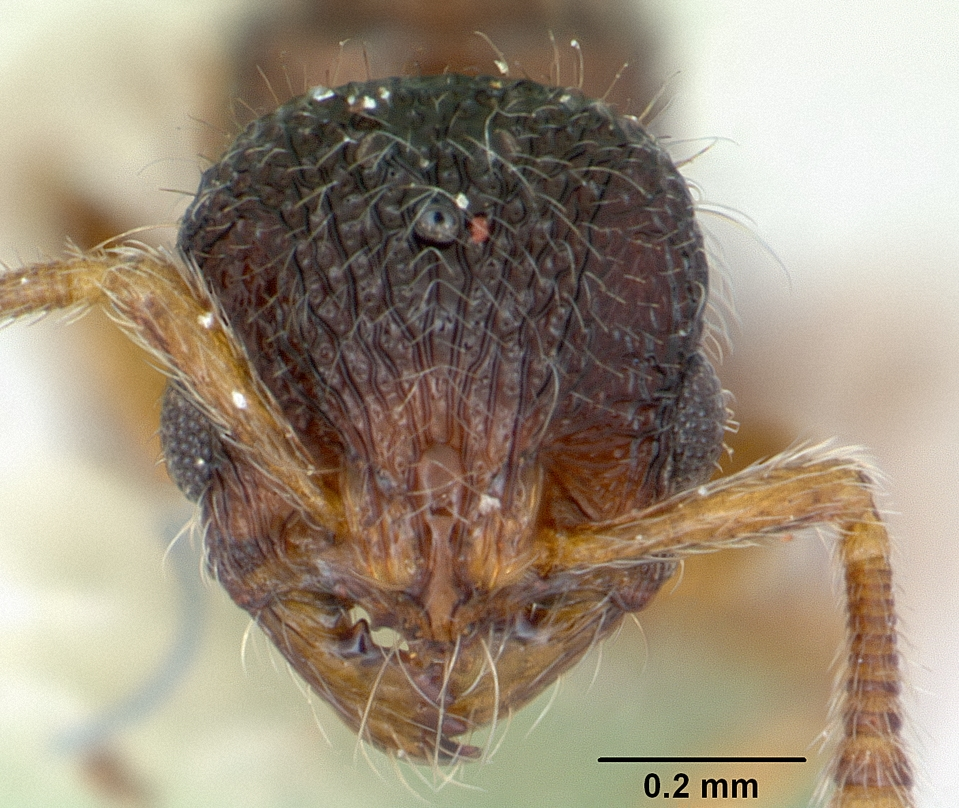
Head of an Adelomyrmex myops dealate queen

Foragers are almost never seen. Adelomyrmex workers generally have small eyes and presumably forage almost entirely beneath the litter. In baiting transects in cloud forest, Adelomyrmex are occasionally encountered, but not in numbers that reflect their abundance in sifted litter samples. Nothing is known of their feeding habits.

The reproductive biology of Adelomyrmex is mysterious. In Winkler samples, Adelomyrmex workers are routinely accompanied by wingless queens and intercaste individuals. The queens are about the same size as workers but with ocelli, large compound eyes, and the typical enlarged mesosoma of myrmicine queens. The typical sclerites of winged queens and apparent wing scars are present. One queen of A. silvestrii from a Winkler sample has a shred of membranous wing, as though it were irregularly torn or chewed off. Intercaste individuals show variable intermediacy between workers and queens, with variable presence of a single median ocellus, compound eyes of intermediate size, and an enlarged promesonotum. In spite of the relative commonness of these putative reproductives, males and winged queens are rare in Central America. None have appeared in hundreds of Winkler samples, and none have appeared in Malaise samples from the same sites where Adelomyrmex are abundant in the litter. The only known winged reproductives in the genus are the single report of males and alate queens of A. vaderi, a species from Colombia.

== Species ==
- Adelomyrmex anxiocalor Longino, 2012
- Adelomyrmex betoi Fernández, 2003
- Adelomyrmex biroi Emery, 1897
- Adelomyrmex bispeculum Longino, 2012
- Adelomyrmex brenesi Longino, 2006
- Adelomyrmex coco Longino, 2012
- Adelomyrmex costatus Fernández, 2003
- Adelomyrmex cristiani Fernández, 2003
- Adelomyrmex dentivagans Longino, 2012
- Adelomyrmex foveolatus Fernández, 2003
- Adelomyrmex grandis Fernández, 2003
- Adelomyrmex hirsutus Mann, 1921
- Adelomyrmex laevigatus Mackay, 2003
- Adelomyrmex longinoi Fernández, 2003
- Adelomyrmex mackayi Fernández, 2003
- Adelomyrmex marginodus Longino, 2012
- Adelomyrmex metzabok Longino, 2012
- Adelomyrmex micans Fernández, 2003
- Adelomyrmex microps Fernández, 2003
- Adelomyrmex minimus Fernández & Mackay, 2003
- Adelomyrmex myops (Wheeler, 1910)
- Adelomyrmex nortenyo Longino, 2012
- Adelomyrmex paratristani Longino, 2012
- Adelomyrmex quetzal Longino, 2012
- Adelomyrmex robustus Fernández, 2003
- Adelomyrmex samoanus Wilson & Taylor, 1967
- Adelomyrmex silvestrii (Menozzi, 1931)
- Adelomyrmex striatus Fernández, 2003
- Adelomyrmex tristani (Menozzi, 1931)
- Adelomyrmex vaderi Fernández, 2003
