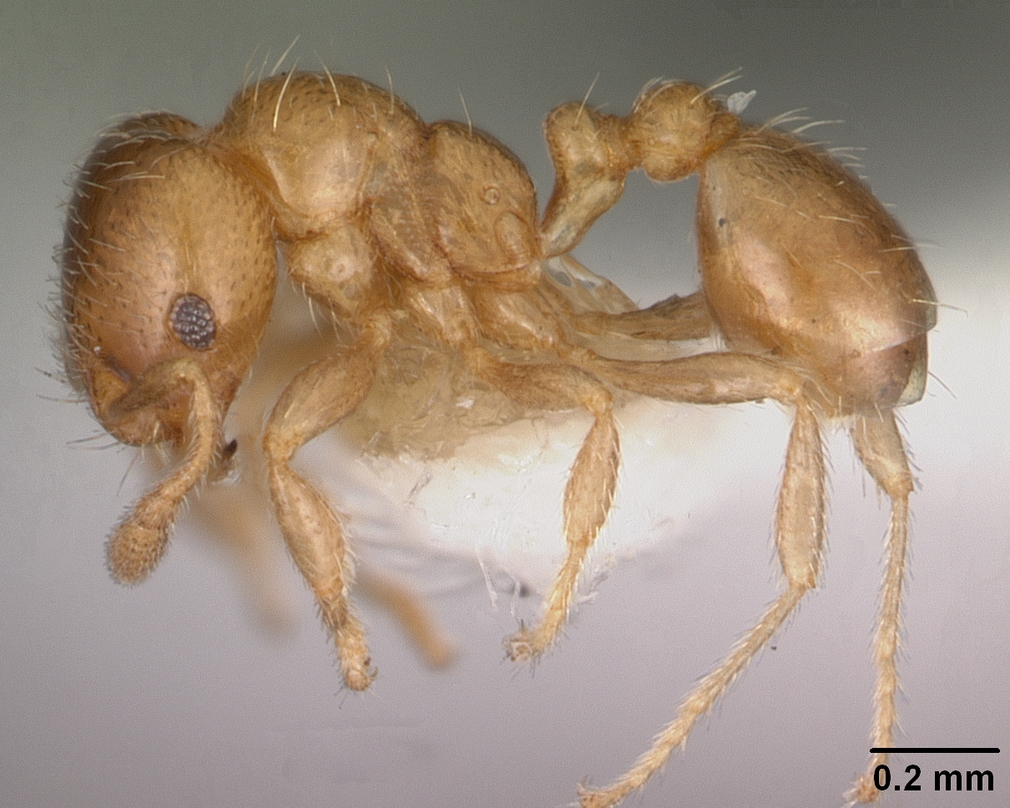
- Diplomorium longipenne worker, syntype specimen

Scientific classification
- Domain: Eukaryota
- Kingdom: Animalia
- Phylum: Arthropoda
- Class: Insecta
- Order: Hymenoptera
- Family: Formicidae
- Subfamily: Myrmicinae
- Tribe: Crematogastrini
- Genus: Diplomorium; Mayr, 1901
- Species: D. longipenne

Binomial name
- Diplomorium longipenne Mayr, 1901

= Diplomorium =

Genus of ants

Diplomorium is a genus of ants in the subfamily Myrmicinae containing the single species Diplomorium longipenne. The genus is known only from females and workers from South Africa, males remain unknown. Little is known about their biology, except that they nest under stones. They have been found nesting at the same location as Messor capensis, however, it is not known whether this was coincidence or if the species have a relation with each other.
