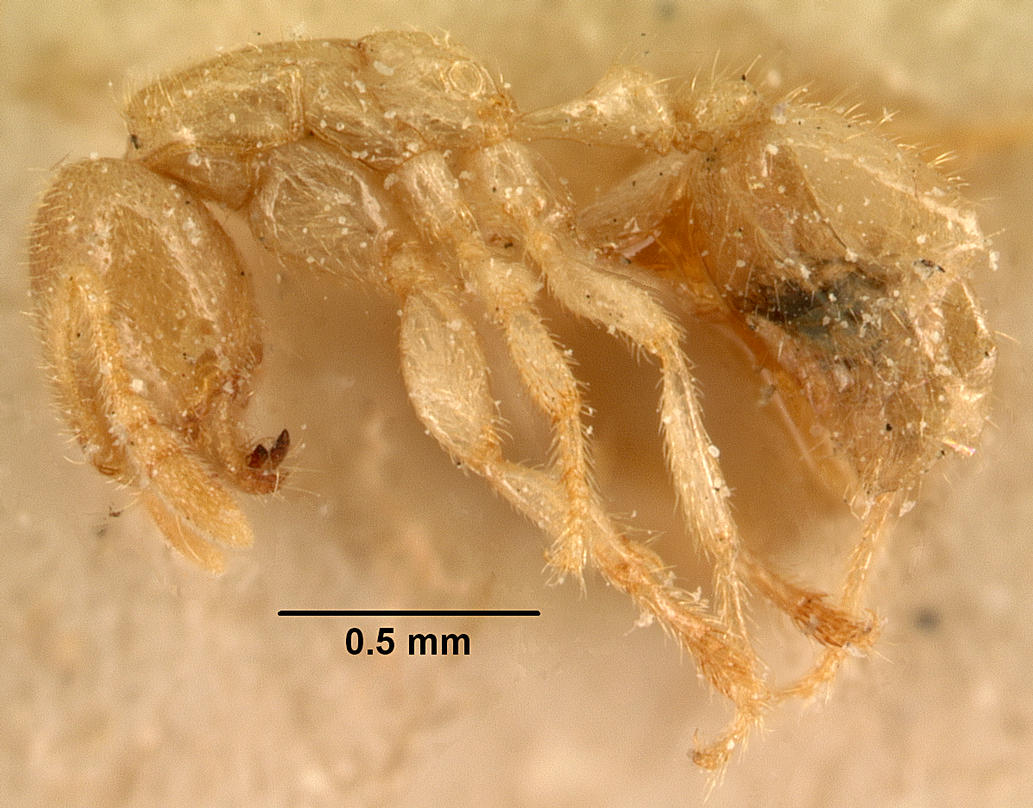

Scientific classification
- Kingdom: Animalia
- Phylum: Arthropoda
- Clade: Pancrustacea
- Class: Insecta
- Order: Hymenoptera
- Family: Formicidae
- Subfamily: Myrmicinae
- Genus: Bondroitia
- Species: B. lujae

Binomial name
- Bondroitia lujae Forel, 1909

= Bondroitia lujae =

Species of ant native to Central Africa

Bondroitia lujae is a species of ant native to Central Africa, one of the only two species in its genus.

== Biology ==
Little to nothing is currently known about the species, although it is primarily found in tropical rainforest, suggesting year round activity, and large colonies.

== Research ==
The species was first discovered in 1909 by Auguste Forel, and little research has been done since.
