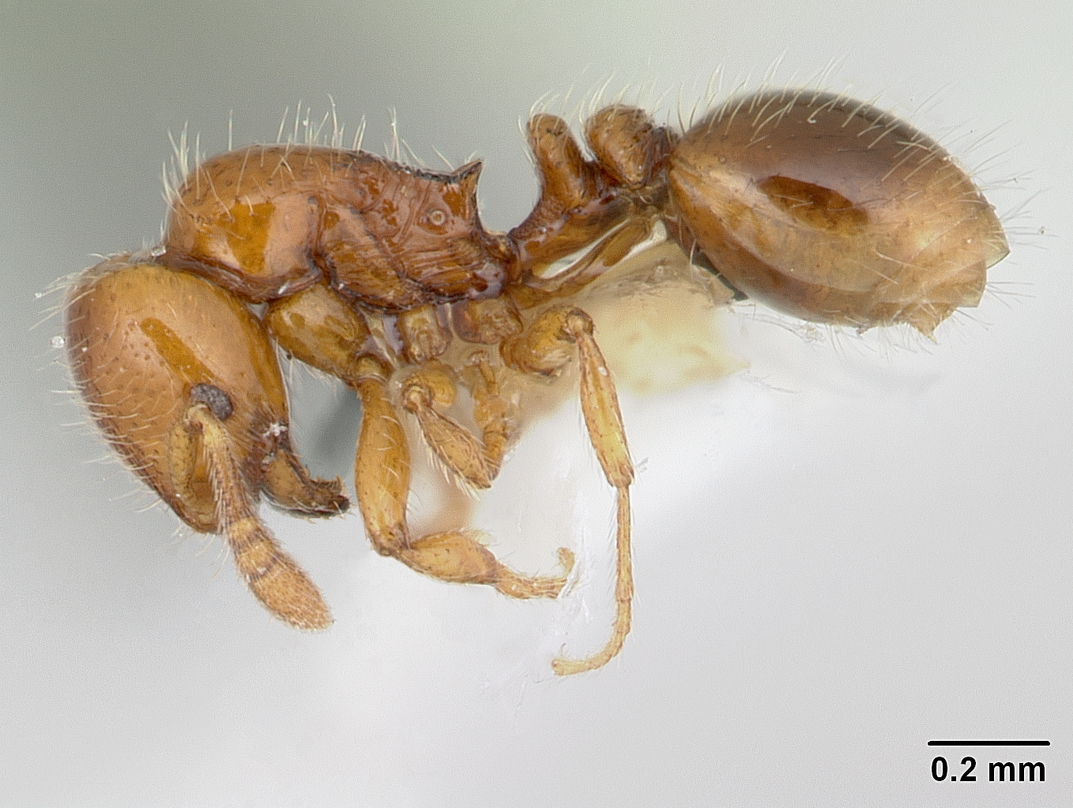
- Oxyepoecus bruchi worker

Conservation status
- Vulnerable (IUCN 2.3)

Scientific classification
- Kingdom: Animalia
- Phylum: Arthropoda
- Class: Insecta
- Order: Hymenoptera
- Family: Formicidae
- Subfamily: Myrmicinae
- Genus: Oxyepoecus
- Species: O. bruchi

Binomial name
- Oxyepoecus bruchi Santschi, 1926

= Oxyepoecus bruchi =

Species of ant

Oxyepoecus bruchi is a species of ant in the subfamily Myrmicinae. It is endemic to Argentina.
