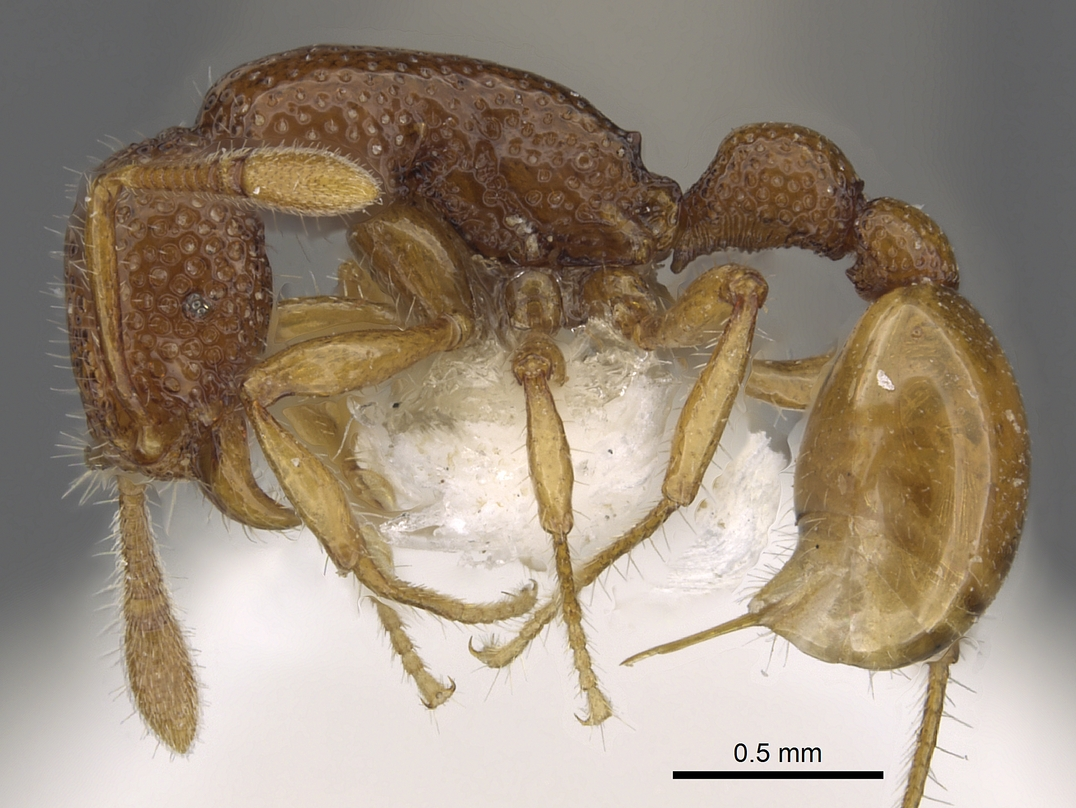

Scientific classification
- Kingdom: Animalia
- Phylum: Arthropoda
- Class: Insecta
- Order: Hymenoptera
- Family: Formicidae
- Subfamily: Myrmicinae
- Genus: Tyrannomyrmex
- Species: T. rex

Binomial name
- Tyrannomyrmex rex Fernández, 2003

= Tyrannomyrmex rex =

Species of ant

Tyrannomyrmex rex is a species of ant in the subfamily Myrmicinae native to Malaysia and Singapore. For the first time in a decade, in 2017, the extremely rare ant was seen alive, living in the dirt of Singapore's Mandai area, according to a report by National Geographic.
