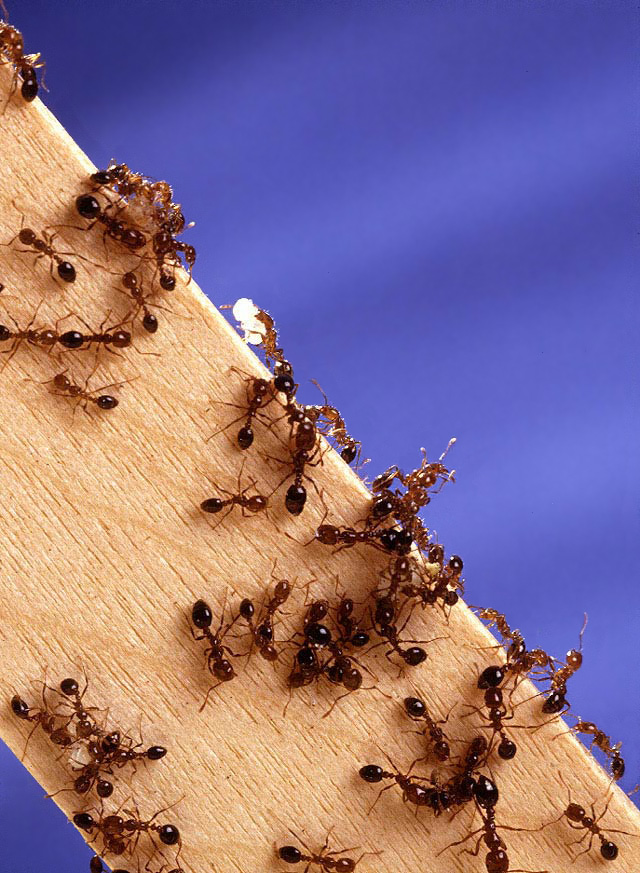
- Solenopsis invicta

Scientific classification
- Kingdom: Animalia
- Phylum: Arthropoda
- Class: Insecta
- Order: Hymenoptera
- Family: Formicidae
- Subfamily: Myrmicinae
- Tribe: Solenopsidini; Forel, 1893

Genera
- See text

Diversity
- 20 genera

= Solenopsidini =

Tribe of ants

Solenopsidini (meaning "pipe-faced") is a tribe of myrmicine ants with about 20 genera.

== Genera ==
- Adelomyrmex Emery, 1897
- Anillomyrma Emery, 1913
- Austromorium Shattuck, 2009
- Baracidris Bolton, 1981
- Bariamyrma Lattke, 1990
- Bondroitia Forel, 1911
- Chelaner Emery, 1914
- Cryptomyrmex Fernández, 2004
- Dolopomyrmex Cover & Deyrup, 2007
- Epelysidris Bolton, 1987
- Erromyrma Bolton & Fisher, 2016
- Kempfidris Fernández, Feitosa & Lattke, 2014
- Megalomyrmex Forel, 1885
- Monomorium Mayr, 1855
- Myrmicaria Saunders, 1842
- Oxyepoecus Santschi, 1926
- Rogeria Emery, 1894
- Solenopsis Westwood, 1840
- Stegomyrmex Emery, 1912
- Syllophopsis Santschi, 1915
- Tropidomyrmex Silva, Feitosa, Brandão & Diniz, 2009
- Tyrannomyrmex Fernández, 2003
- Unicumyrmex Chung, Hsu, Hsu & Lin, 2025
