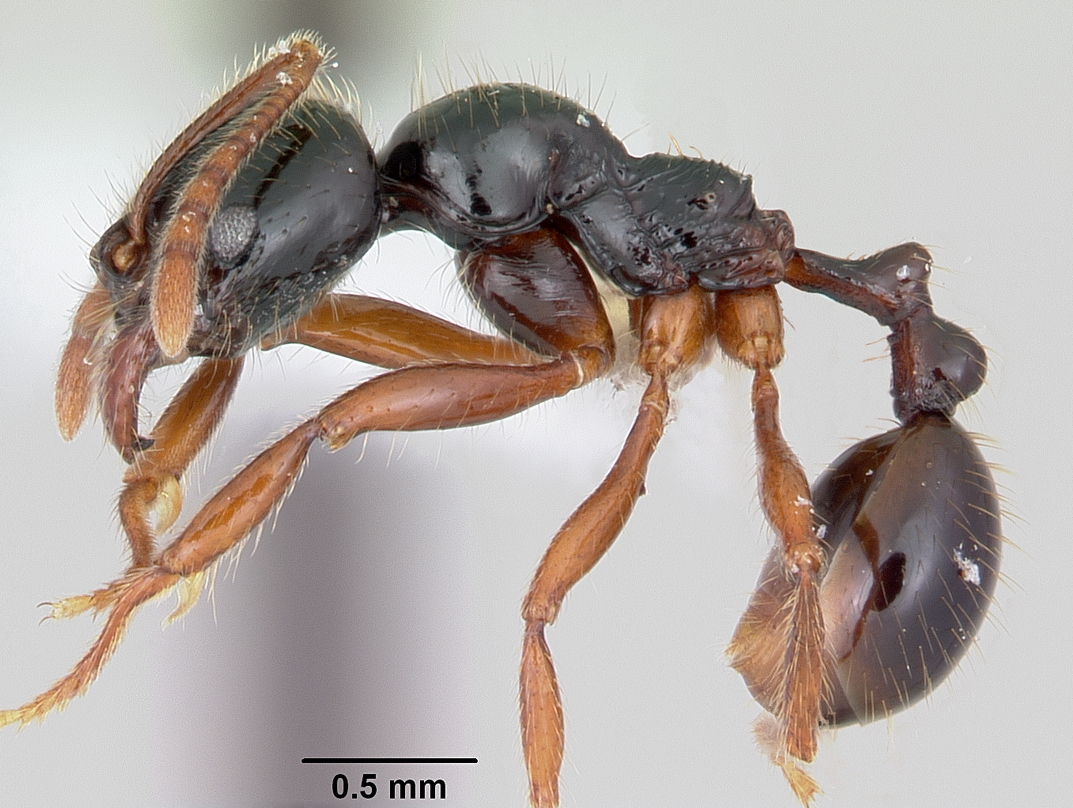
- S. alas worker from Costa Rica

Scientific classification
- Kingdom: Animalia
- Phylum: Arthropoda
- Class: Insecta
- Order: Hymenoptera
- Family: Formicidae
- Subfamily: Myrmicinae
- Genus: Stenamma
- Species: S. alas

Binomial name
- Stenamma alas Longino, 2005

= Stenamma alas =

Species of ant

Stenamma alas is a species of ant which can be found in wet forests of Costa Rica on an elevation of 50–1,600 metres (160–5,250 ft).

== Description ==
It pronotum is feeble and thin and have transverse stretch marks. The species legs are reddish-brown in colour while its head is dorsal on face and have a rugae which is transverse. Its propodeum is identical in brightness to promesonotum while its mesosoma is dark in colour.

== Habitat ==
The species is found on clay banks, along the streams, and on hillsides.
