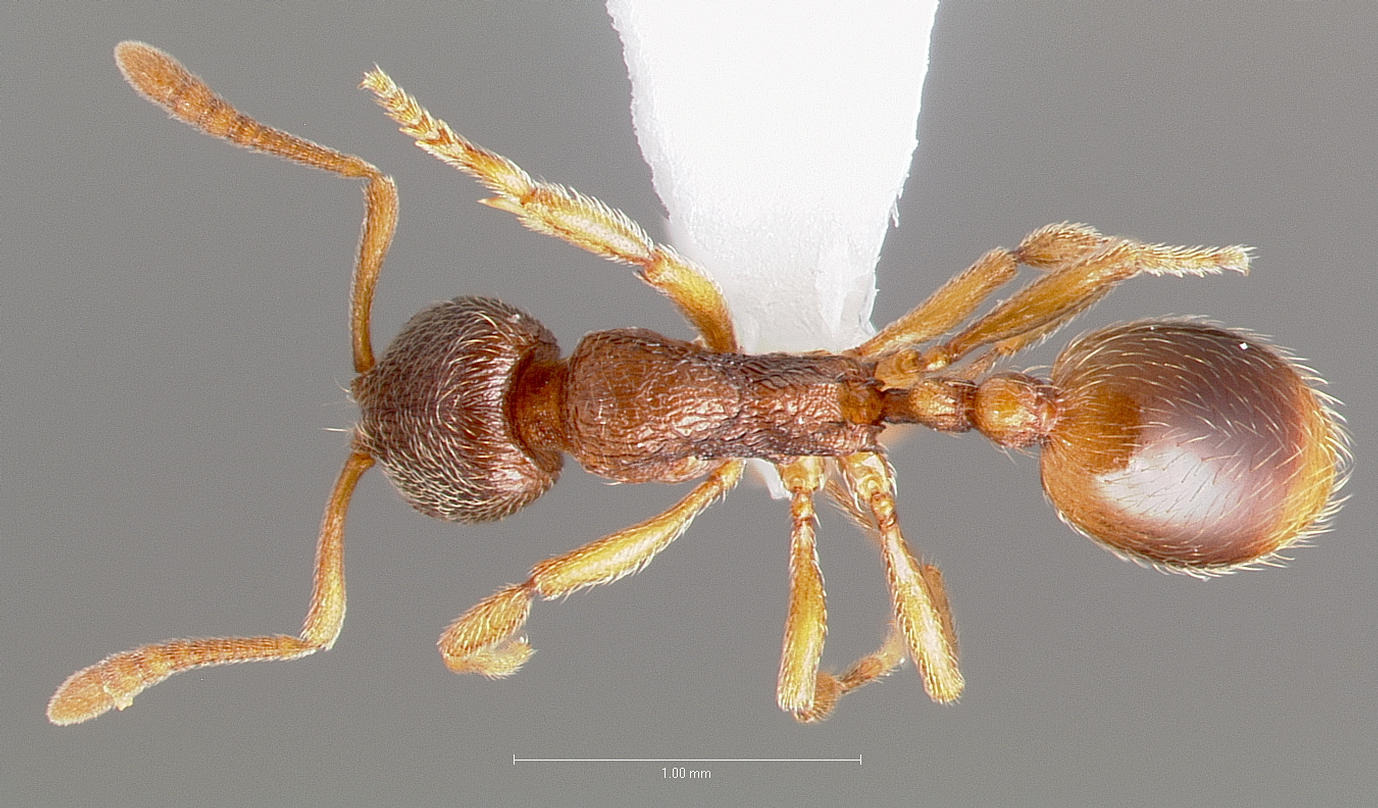

Scientific classification
- Domain: Eukaryota
- Kingdom: Animalia
- Phylum: Arthropoda
- Class: Insecta
- Order: Hymenoptera
- Family: Formicidae
- Subfamily: Myrmicinae
- Tribe: Stenammini
- Genus: Stenamma
- Species: S. snellingi

Binomial name
- Stenamma snellingi Bolton, 1995

= Stenamma snellingi =

Species of ant

Stenamma snellingi is a species of ant in the family Formicidae.

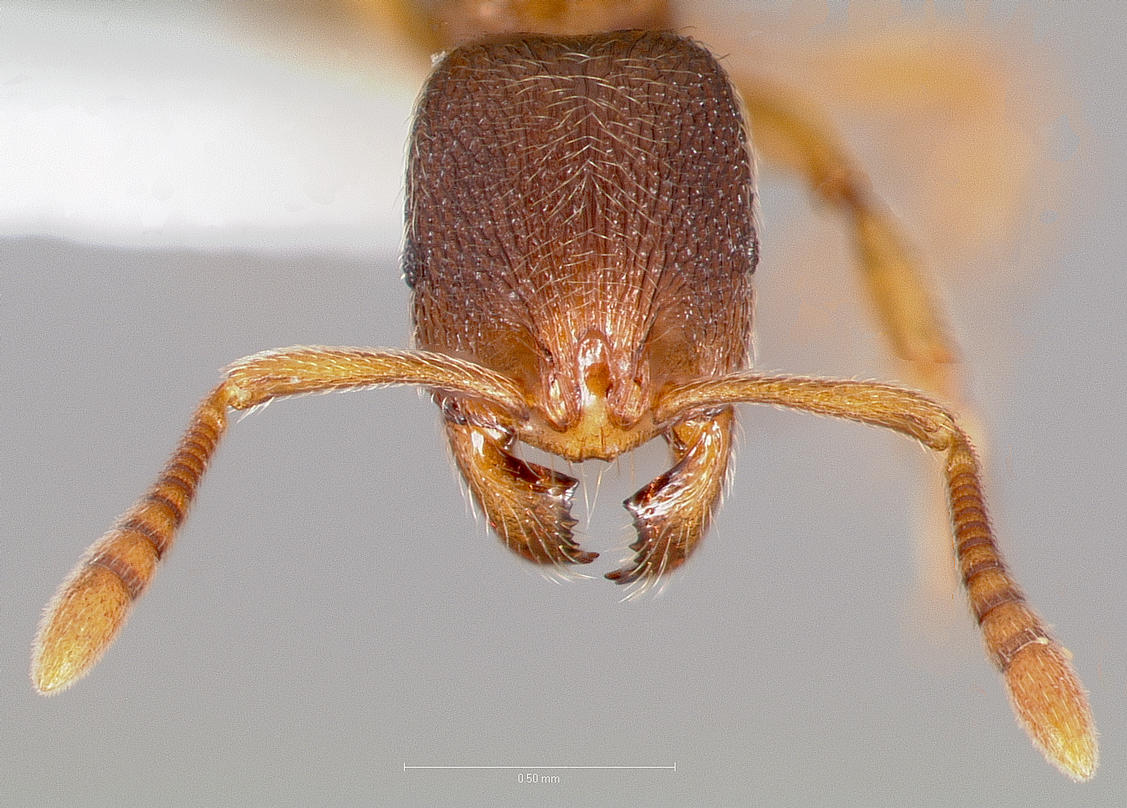

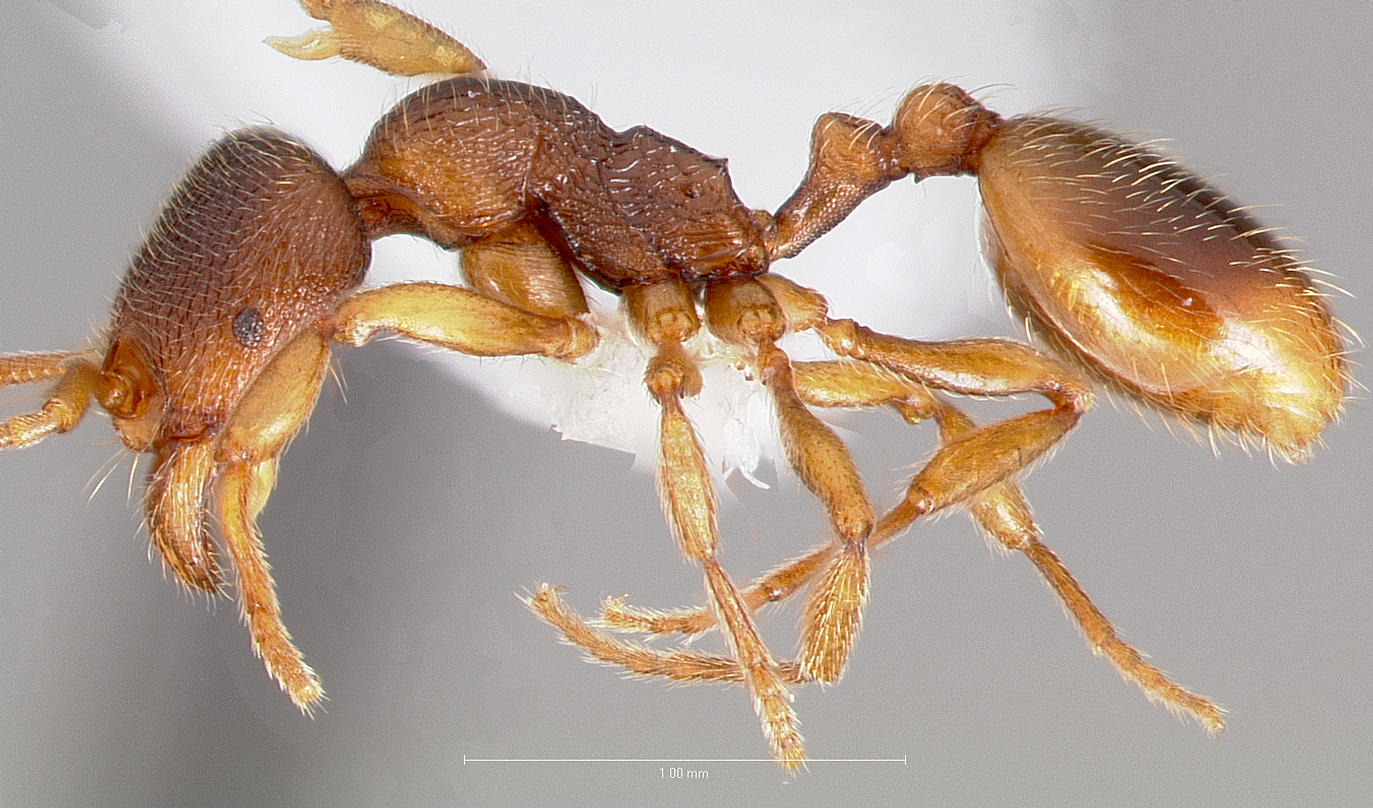
