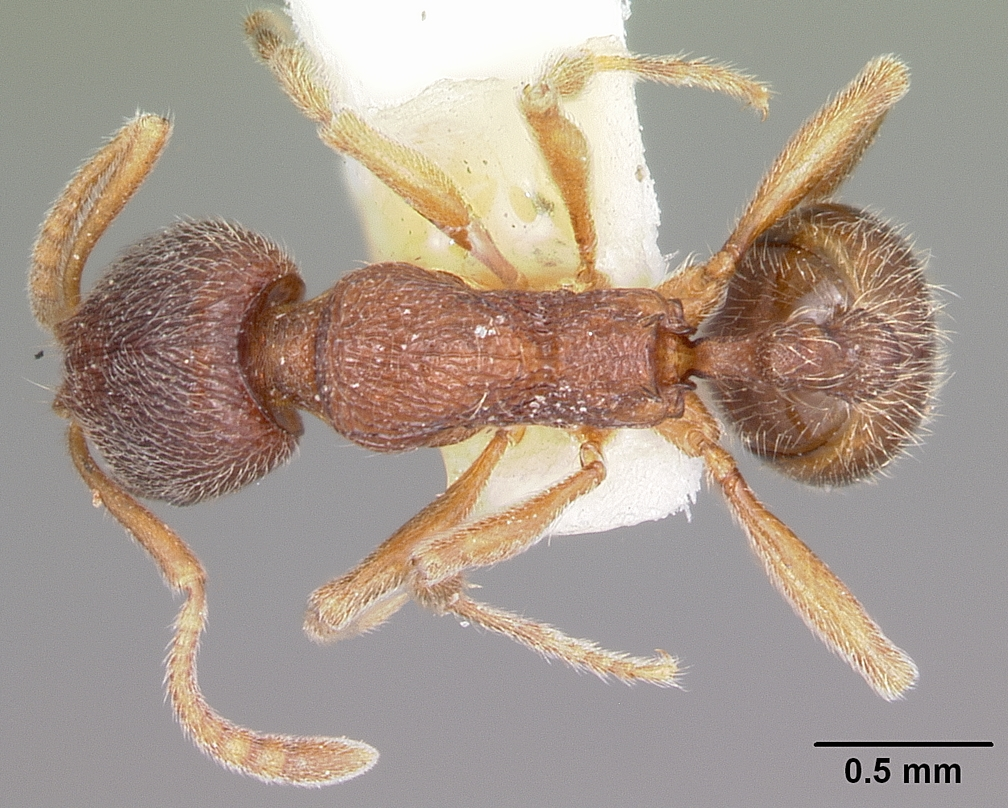

Scientific classification
- Domain: Eukaryota
- Kingdom: Animalia
- Phylum: Arthropoda
- Class: Insecta
- Order: Hymenoptera
- Family: Formicidae
- Subfamily: Myrmicinae
- Tribe: Stenammini
- Genus: Stenamma
- Species: S. brevicorne

Binomial name
- Stenamma brevicorne (Mayr, 1886)

= Stenamma brevicorne =

Species of ant

Stenamma brevicorne is a species of ant in the family Formicidae.

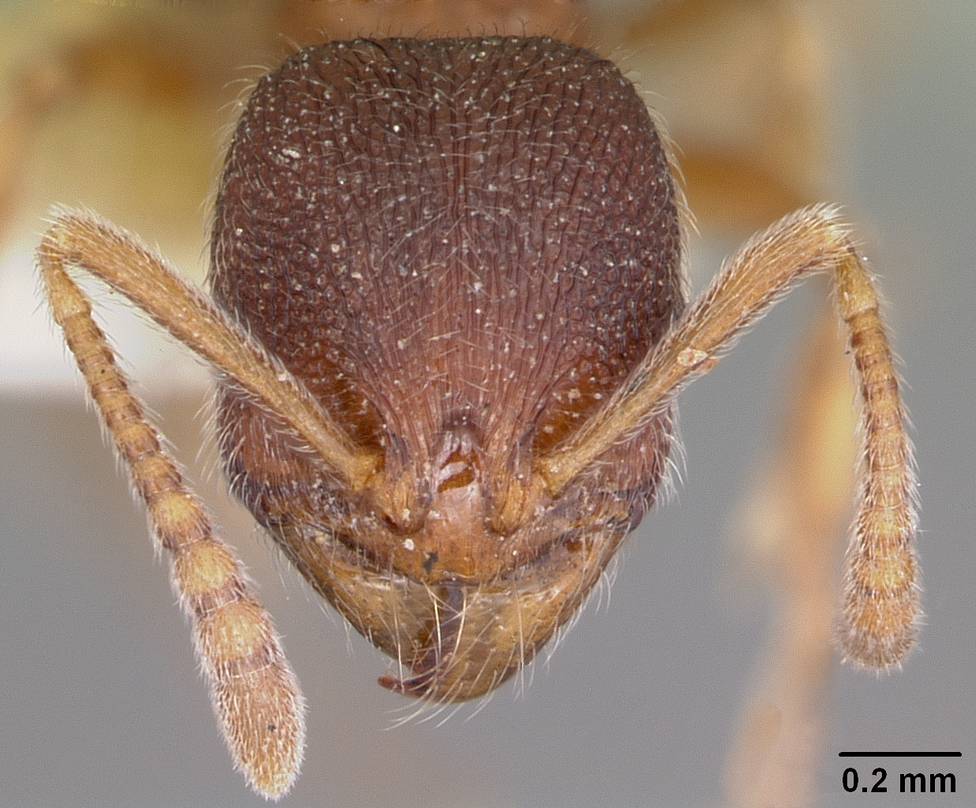

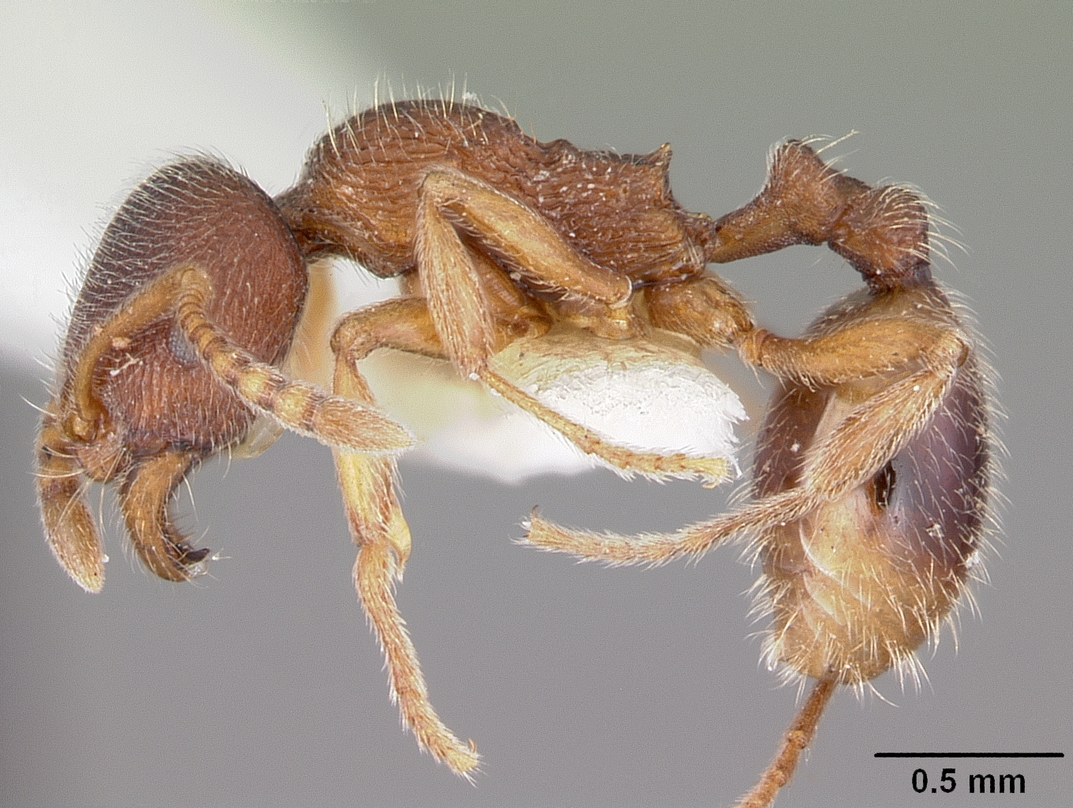

== Subspecies ==
These subspecies belong to the species Stenamma brevicorne:

- Stenamma brevicorne brevicorne
- Stenamma brevicorne heathi Wheeler
- Stenamma brevicorne sequoiarum Wheeler
