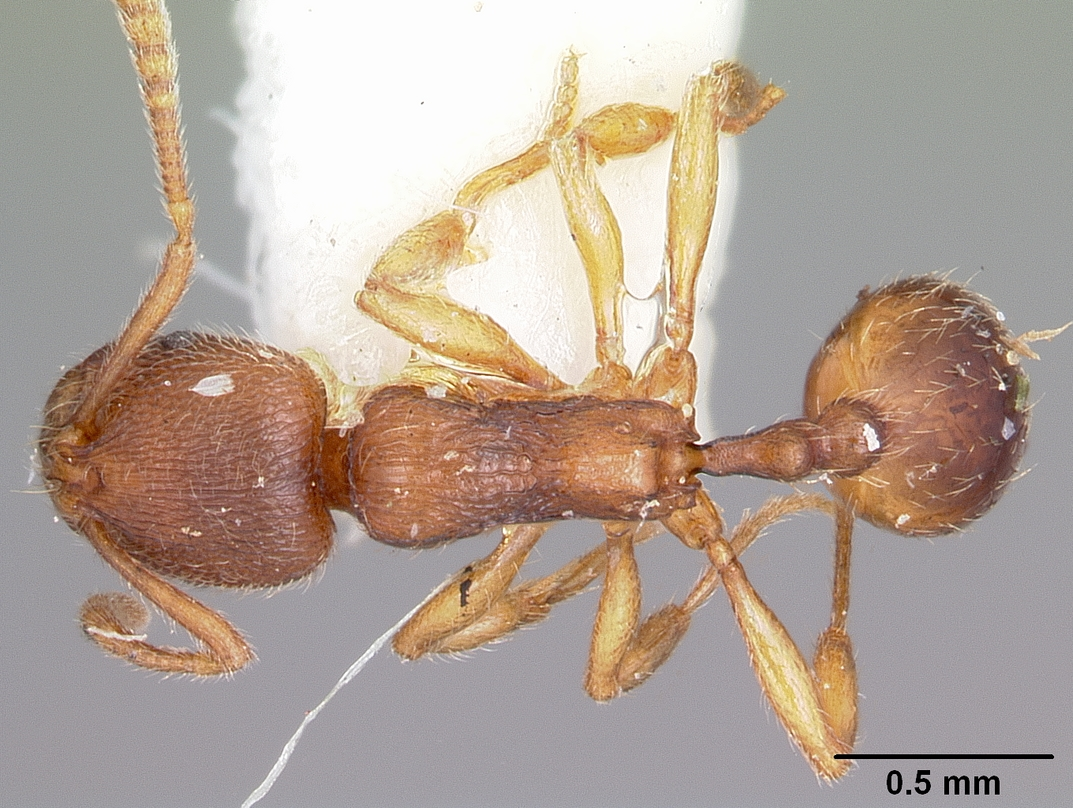

Scientific classification
- Domain: Eukaryota
- Kingdom: Animalia
- Phylum: Arthropoda
- Class: Insecta
- Order: Hymenoptera
- Family: Formicidae
- Subfamily: Myrmicinae
- Genus: Stenamma
- Species: S. impar

Binomial name
- Stenamma impar Forel, 1901

= Stenamma impar =

Species of ant

Stenamma impar is a species of ant in the family Formicidae.

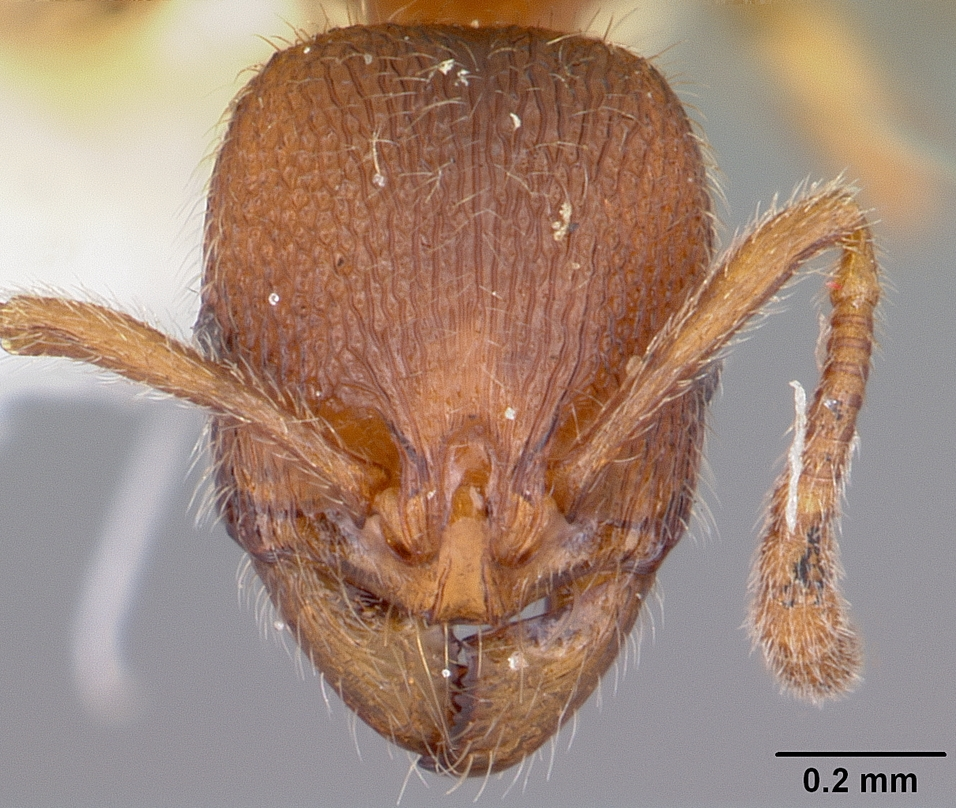

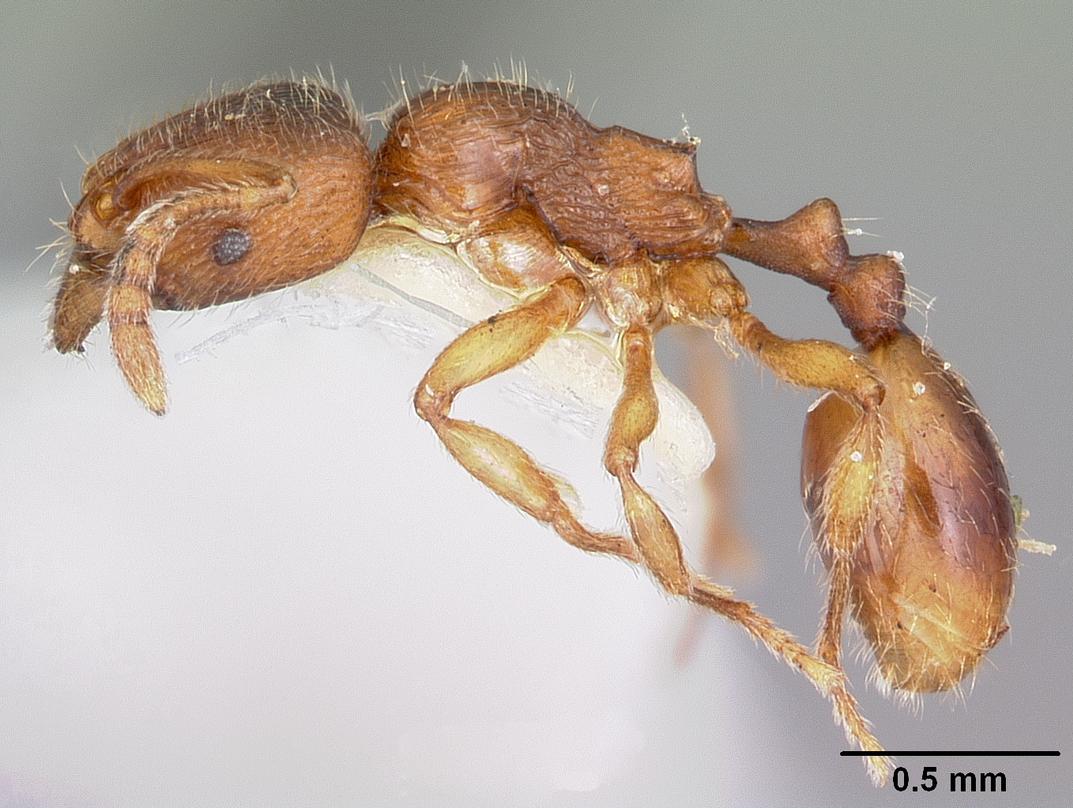
