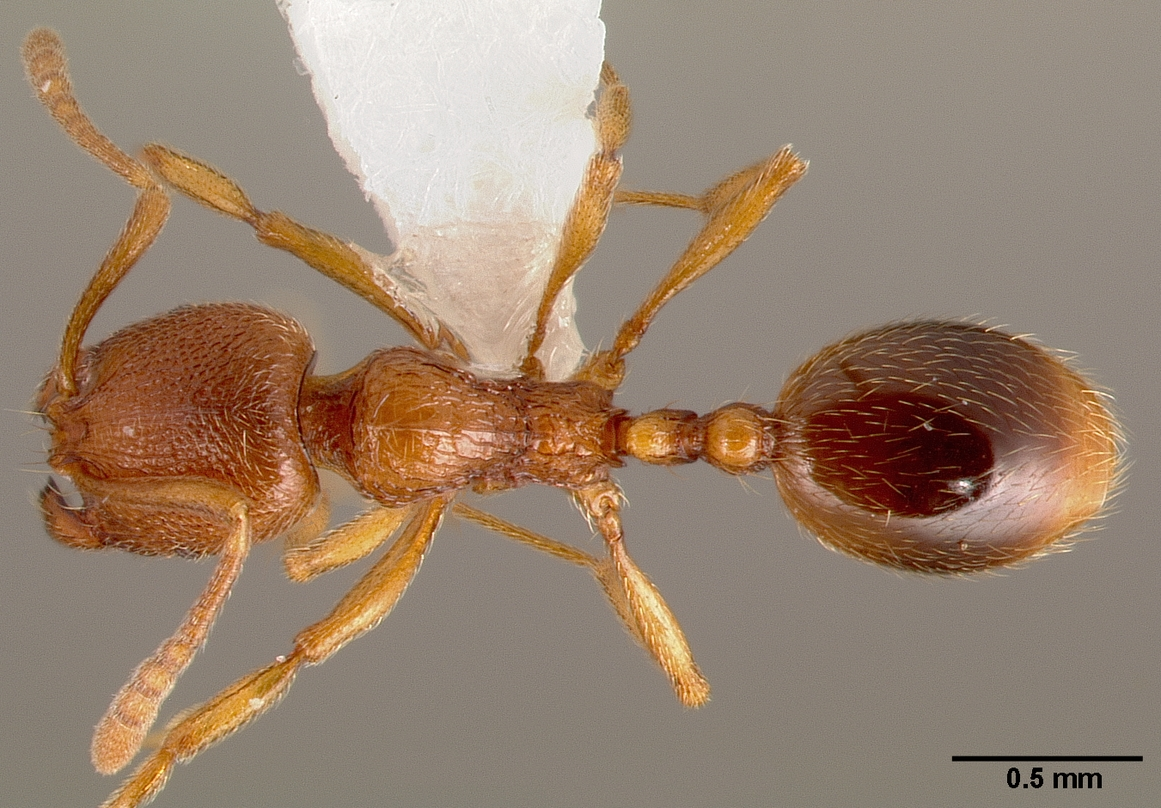

Scientific classification
- Domain: Eukaryota
- Kingdom: Animalia
- Phylum: Arthropoda
- Class: Insecta
- Order: Hymenoptera
- Family: Formicidae
- Subfamily: Myrmicinae
- Genus: Stenamma
- Species: S. diecki

Binomial name
- Stenamma diecki Emery, 1895

= Stenamma diecki =

Species of ant

Stenamma diecki is a species of ant in the family Formicidae. These ants typically nest underneath logs or rocks, often in forests.

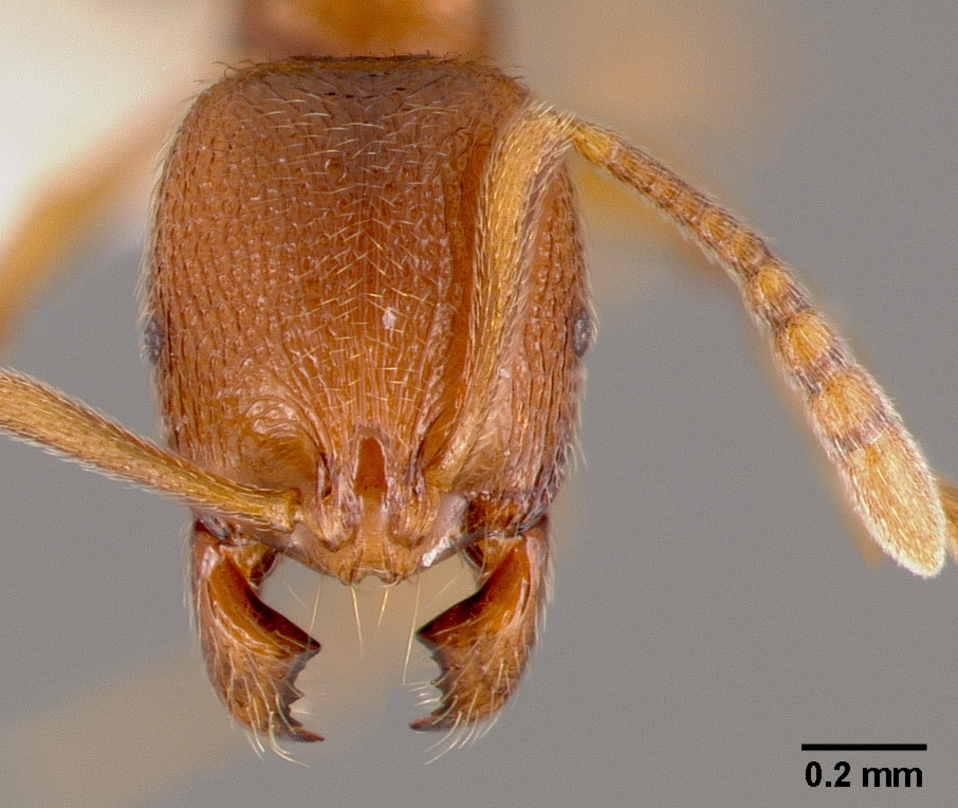

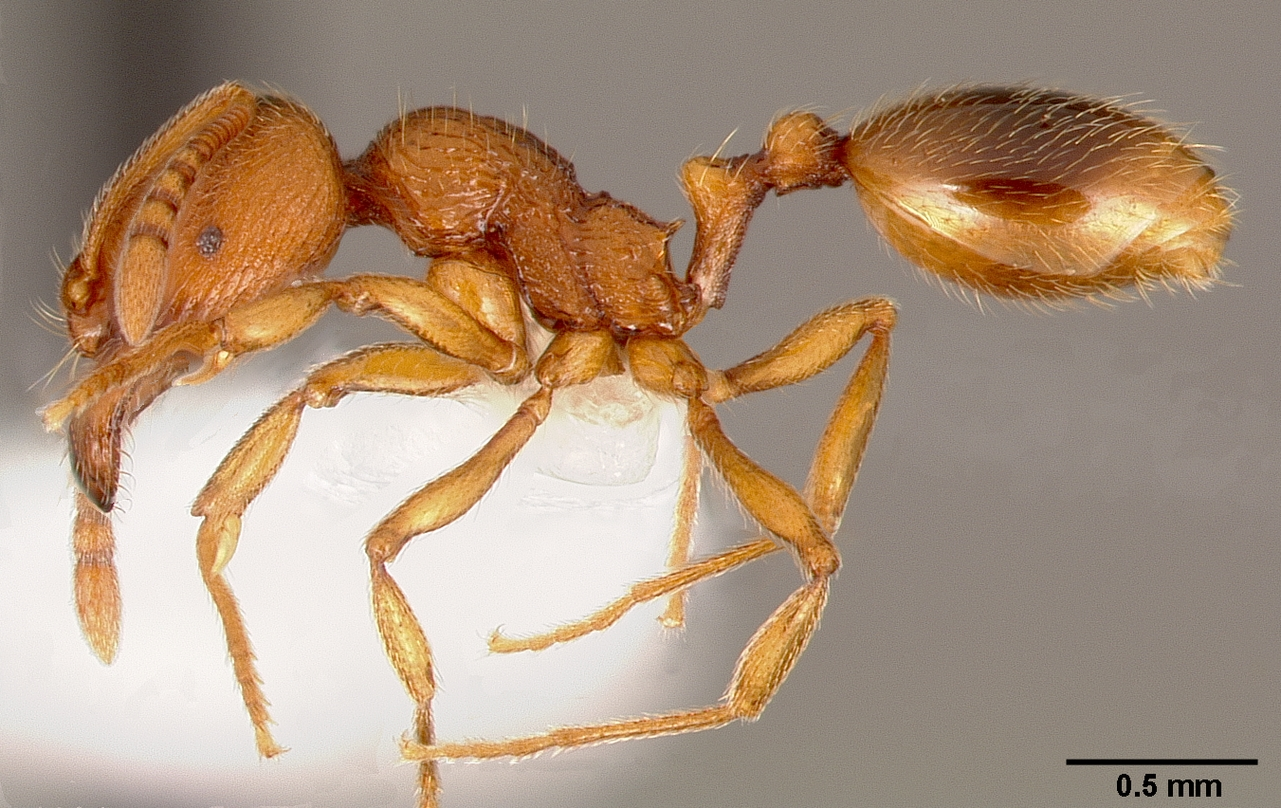
