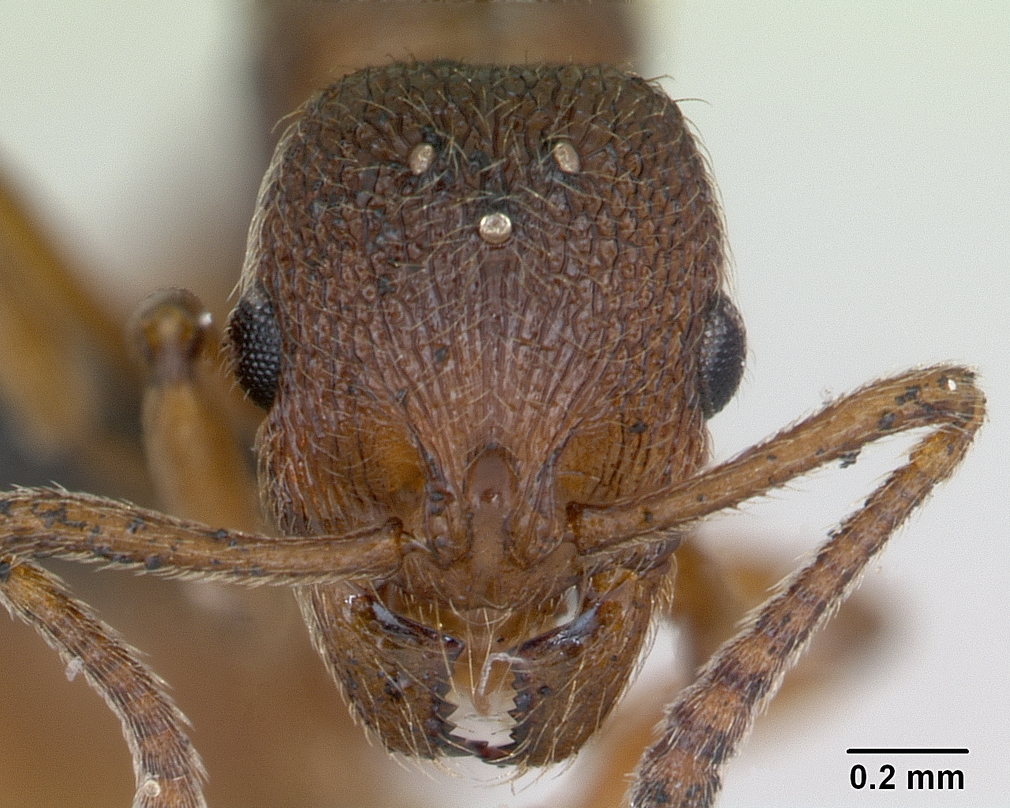
- Head of an alate (queen)

Scientific classification
- Domain: Eukaryota
- Kingdom: Animalia
- Phylum: Arthropoda
- Class: Insecta
- Order: Hymenoptera
- Family: Formicidae
- Subfamily: Myrmicinae
- Genus: Stenamma
- Species: S. westwoodii

Binomial name
- Stenamma westwoodii Westwood, 1839

= Stenamma westwoodii =

Species of ant

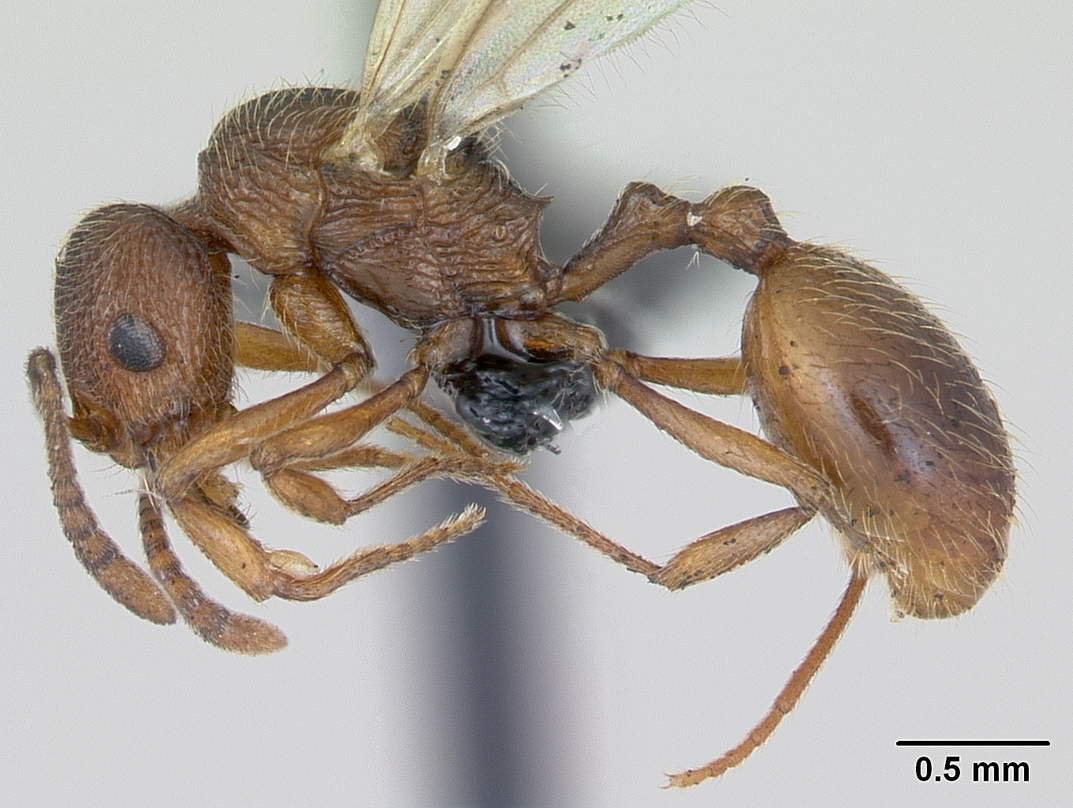
Stenamma westwoodii queen. Profile view

Stenamma westwoodii is a species of ant native to areas of Europe and some parts of eastern Asia. Part of the Formicidae family and the Stenamma genus, the species was discovered by John O. Westwood in 1839. Colonies generally consist of approximately 150 workers.

== Description ==
Stenamma westwoodii is a rusty-red/reddish brown, bearing resemblance to Stenamma debile, to the point where microscopic examination is required. Before 1990, it was believed to be the only Stenamma species in the British Isles, it is now thought that S. debile is far more common, and many earlier records to S. westwoodii are now treated as S. westwoodii aggregate.

The body is covered in scattered pale hairs, laying flat on appendages. Workers are measured at 3.5 - 4.0mm, queens measured at 4.2 - 4.8mm with their wings having a yellowish tint and males measured at 3.8 - 4.5mm.

== Distribution and habitat ==
Stenamma westwoodii is native to north and eastern Europe, with some specimens found in areas as far east as Armenia and Georgia. The majority of the specie's population is in the United Kingdom, in the south of the country.

Stenamma westwoodii's nests consist of up to 150 workers. The species is monogenous, meaning a single queen per colony. Their nests are often found in dry and well-drained woodland, nesting beneath deep stones, under moss and among tree roots.

== Biology ==
Stenamma westwoodii is described as an unobtrusive species, often seen as a single worker in a woodland. Their workers forage during early morning or warm, overcast days. The species demonstrates scavenging and predatory behaviours, hunting mites and small insects, though they are slow moving and non-aggressive towards other ants. Alates can be found in the nest during late Summer - late Autumn and are shown to fly in September and October.

== Gallery ==
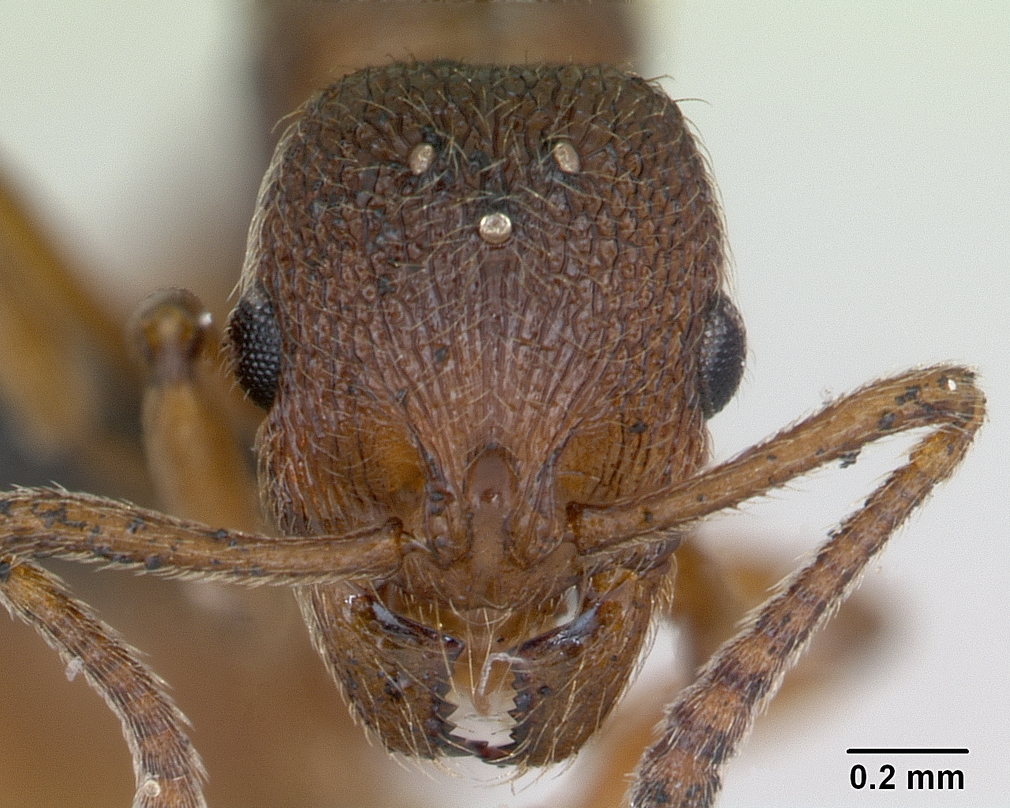
Head of S. westwoodii alate

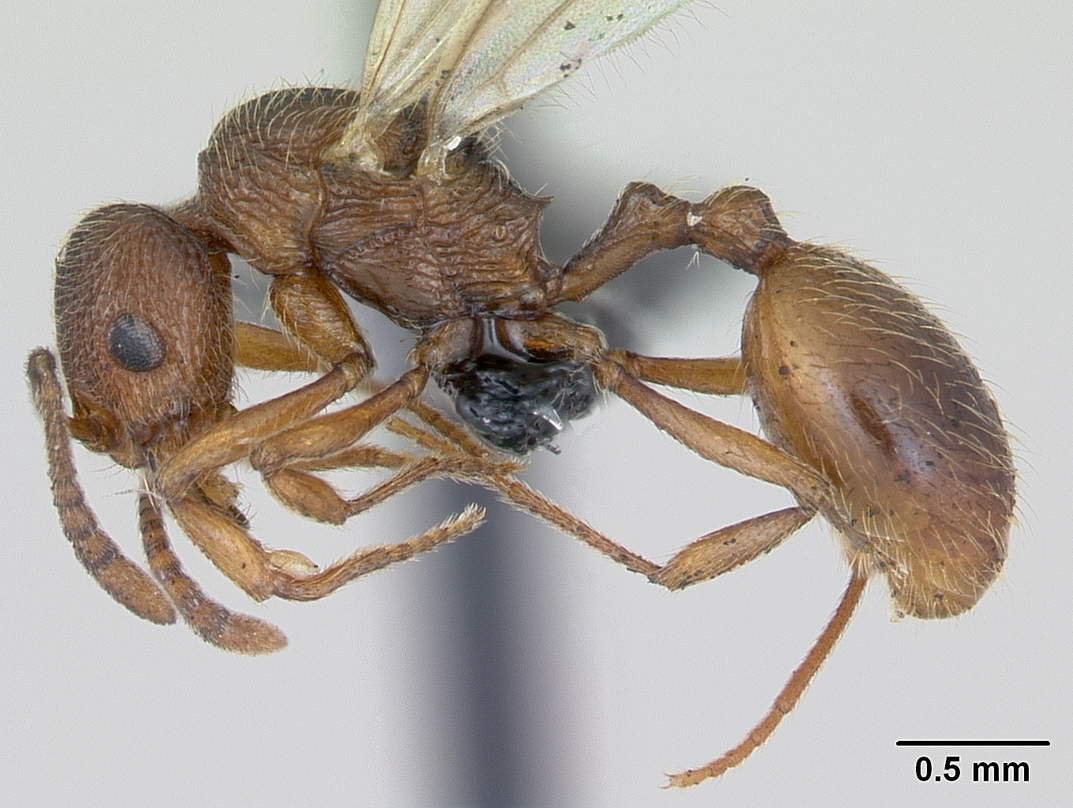
S. westwoodii alate profile view

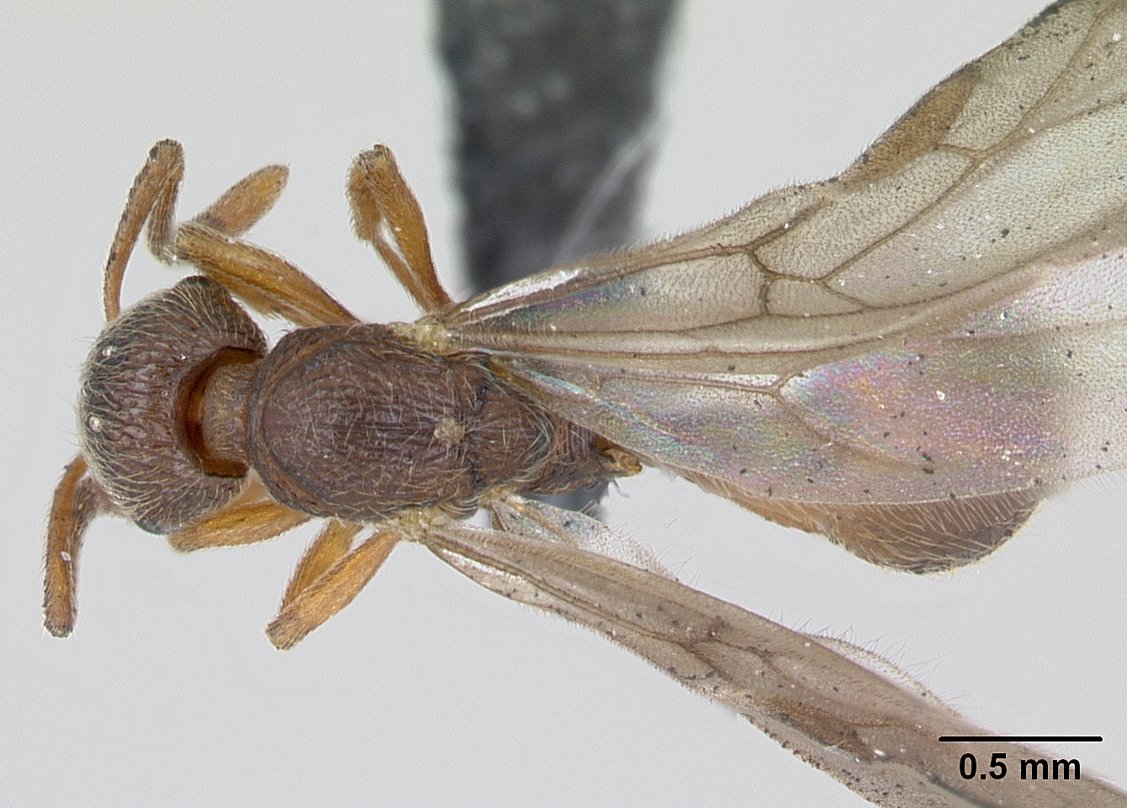
Top-down view of S. westwoodii alate

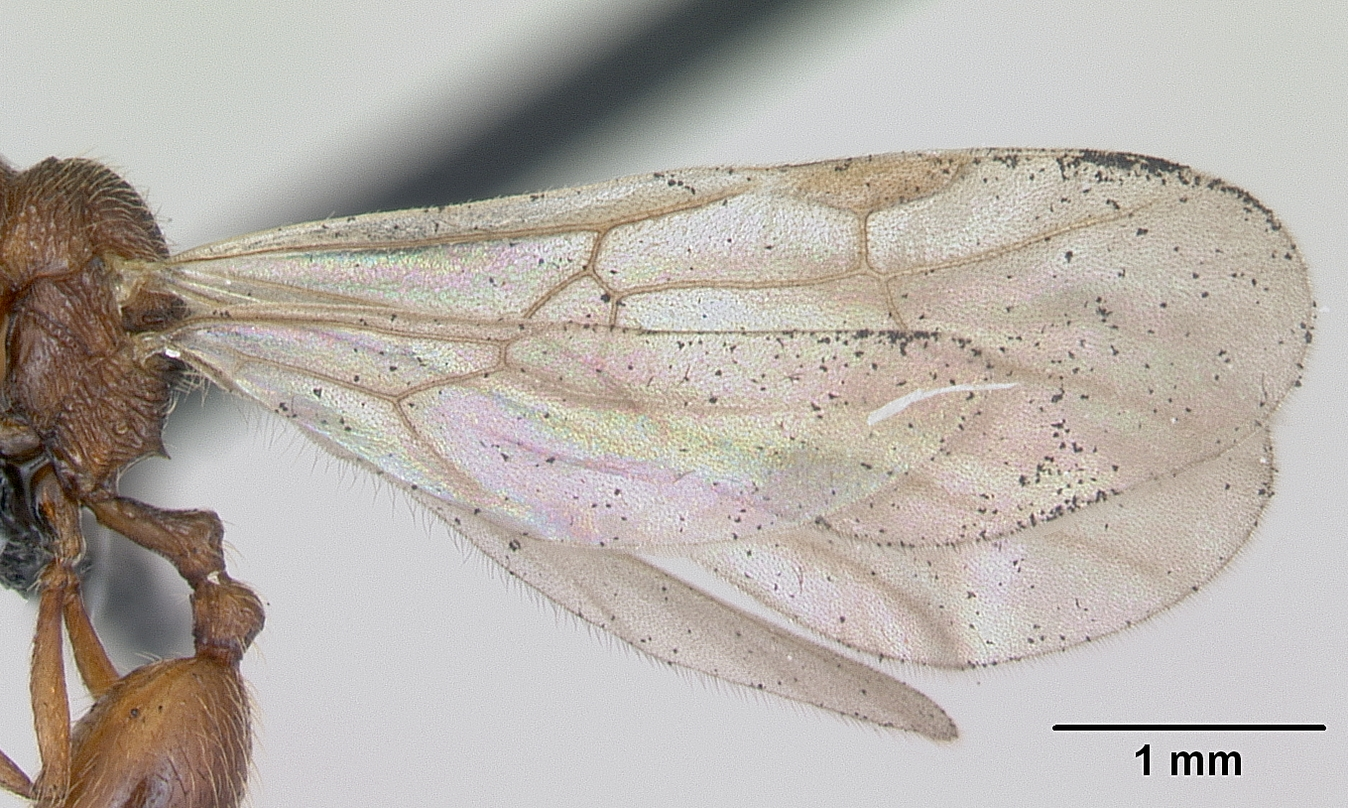
S. westwoodii alate wing

== See also ==
- List of ants of Great Britain
