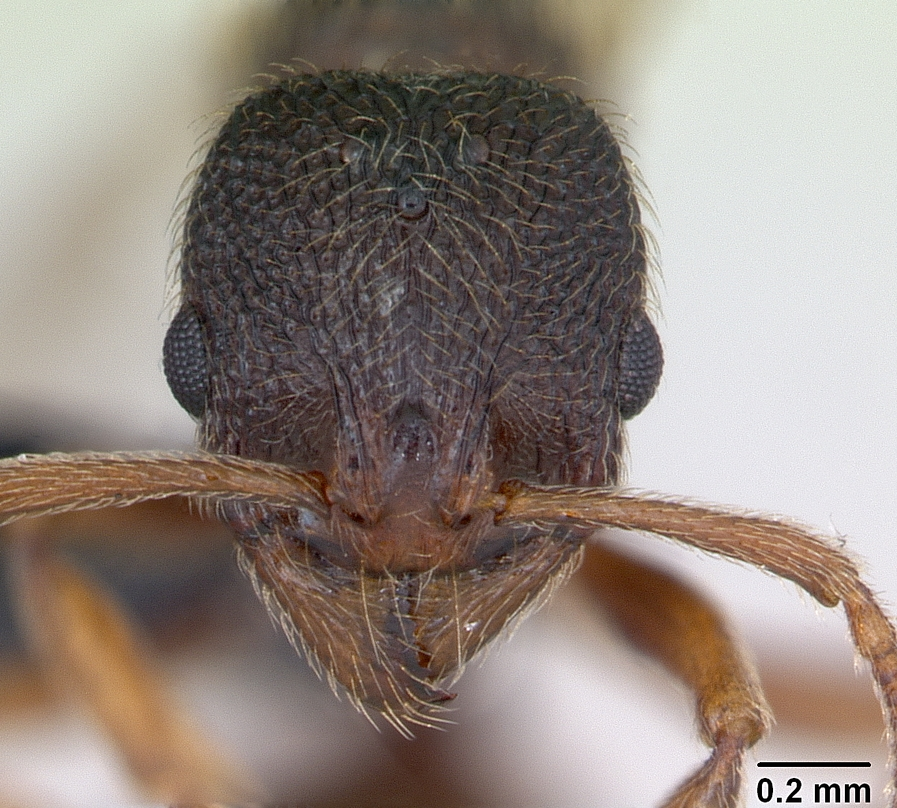

Scientific classification
- Domain: Eukaryota
- Kingdom: Animalia
- Phylum: Arthropoda
- Class: Insecta
- Order: Hymenoptera
- Family: Formicidae
- Subfamily: Myrmicinae
- Genus: Stenamma
- Species: S. debile

Binomial name
- Stenamma debile (Foerster, 1850)

= Stenamma debile =

Species of insect

Stenamma debile is a species of ant belonging to the family Formicidae, native to Europe but most common in north west European territories. Colonies consist of less than 100 workers, typically found in forests. The species was discovered in 1850 by Arnold Förster.

== Description ==
S. debile is very similar to S. westwoodii, with microscopic inspection required to distinguish the two. The species are so similar that up until the 1990s, S. westwoodii was thought to be the only species of the genus in the British Isles, until Dubois (1993) pointed out the separate species. S. debile is the far more common species, and much more likely to be encountered.

The holotype for this species was previously a male specimen, though it is confirmed the holotype for this species is completely destroyed.

S. debile is overall a reddish-brown, with a long and thin petiole, which can be used for identification.

== Distribution and habitat ==
S. debile is native to Europe, though the population is largely located in south England, north France and the lowland countries, with another concentration in and around Switzerland. The ant is somewhat sparsely populated in eastern Europe, though has a larger population on the far south of the Scandinavian Peninsula.

Their colonies are most often found in deciduous woodland, where there is an undisturbed layer of leaf litter. S. debile has not shown any preference for soil type and their nests are often found beneath stones and leaf litter.

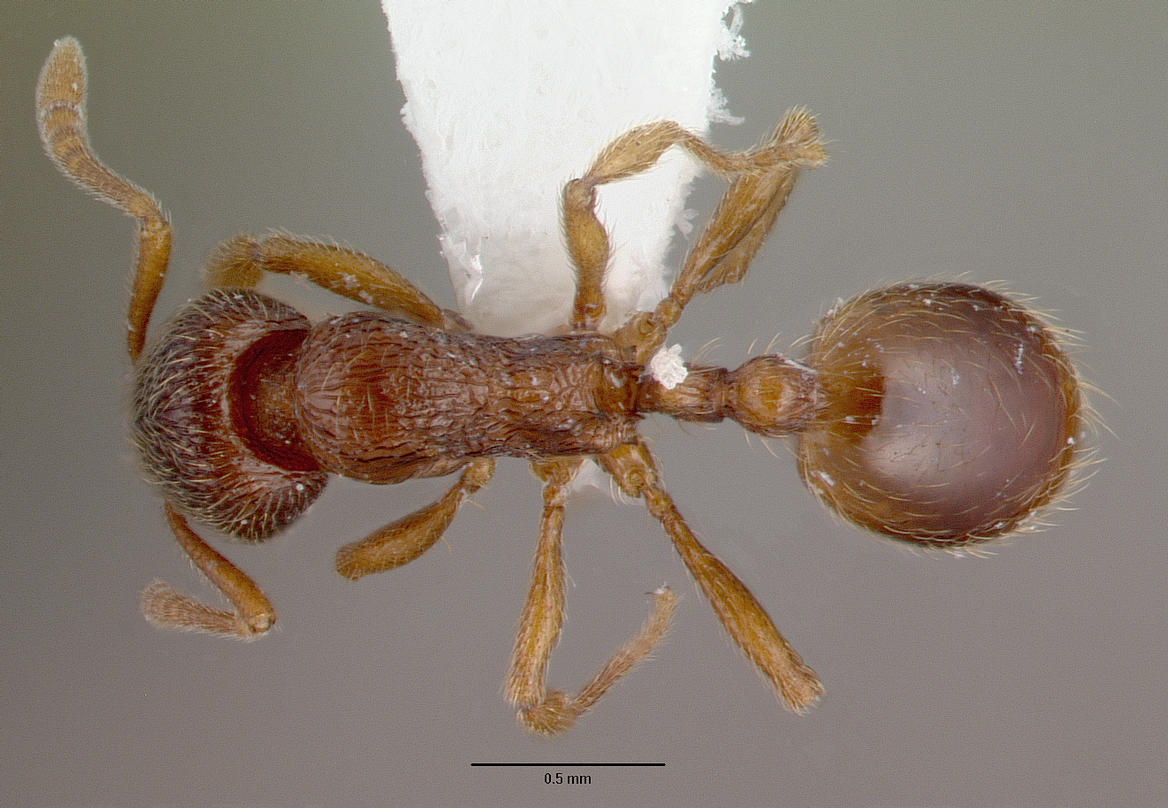
Stenamma debile dorsal view

Due to S. debile's similarities with S. westwoodii, the species are often easily confused, though S. debile is far more common and easily encountered.

== Biology ==
S. debile is known to nest largely in forests and woodland, showing preference towards deciduous woods with undisturbed leaf litter, often nesting under it. Nests are also often found beneath stones and rocks. Nests are often very small, containing only 1 queen and rarely surpassing 100 workers.

The species is not considered threatened or vulnerable.

Their diet is shown to be carnivorous.

== Gallery ==
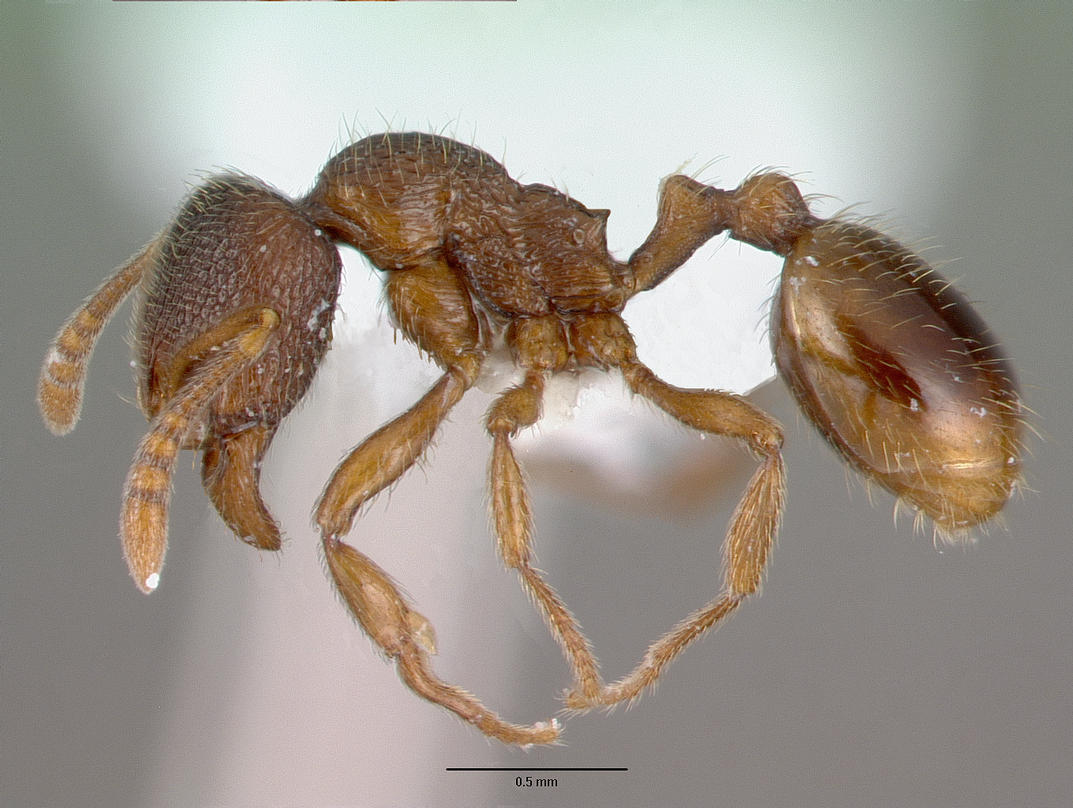
Stenamma debile worker, profile view

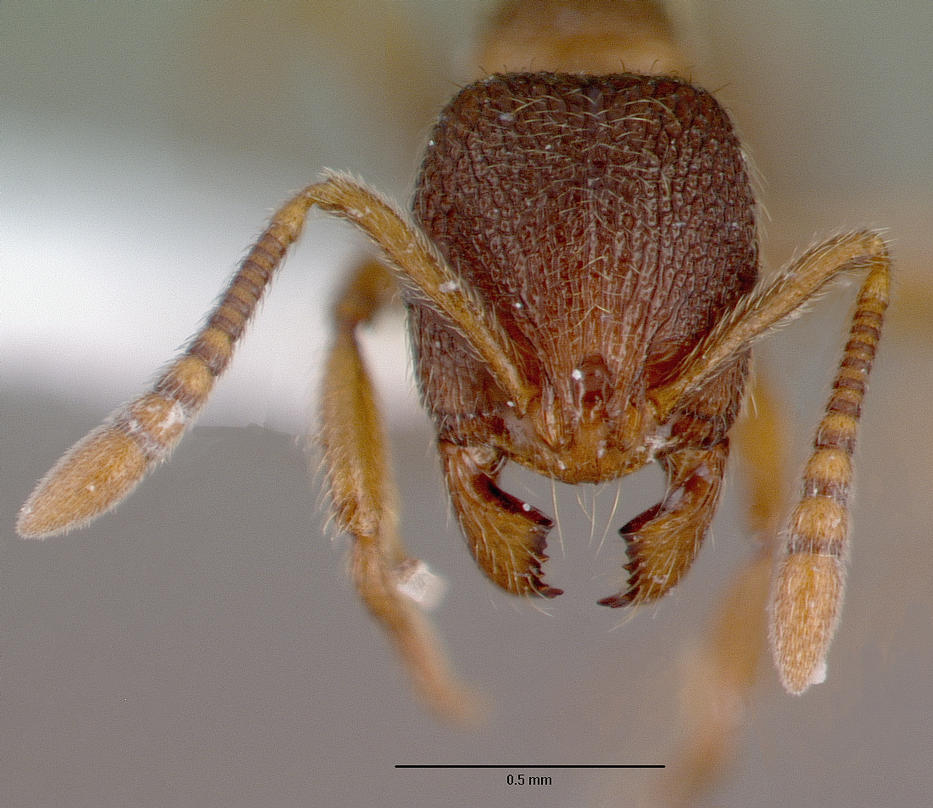
Stenamma debile worker head

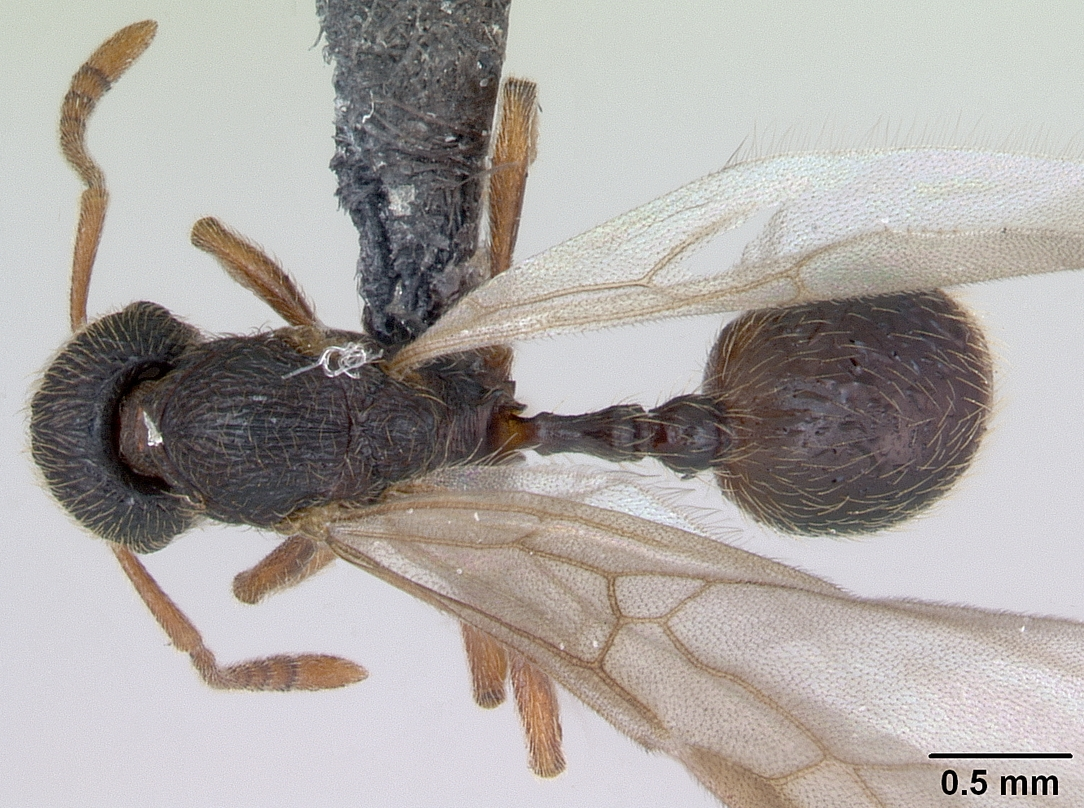
Stenamma debile Alate, dorsal view

== See also ==
- List of Ants of Great Britain
