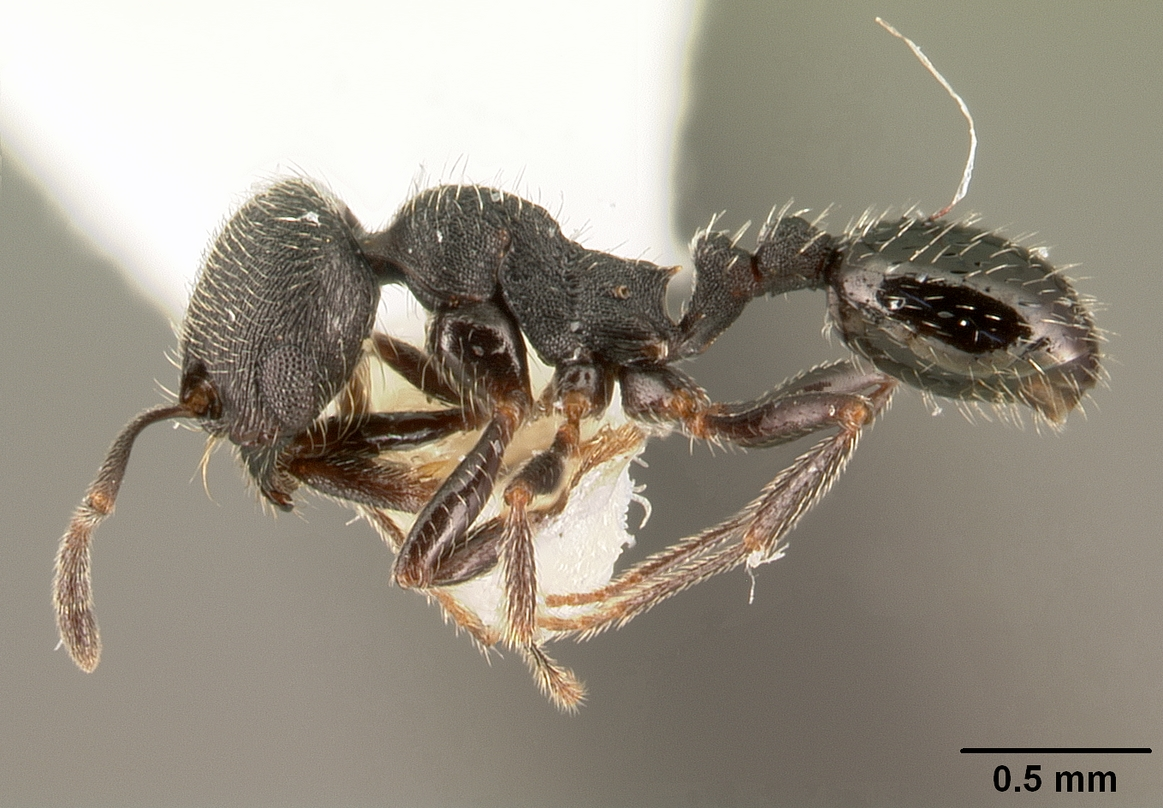
- Oxyopomyrmex oculatus worker

Scientific classification
- Domain: Eukaryota
- Kingdom: Animalia
- Phylum: Arthropoda
- Class: Insecta
- Order: Hymenoptera
- Family: Formicidae
- Subfamily: Myrmicinae
- Tribe: Stenammini
- Genus: Oxyopomyrmex; André, 1881

Type species
- Oxyopomyrmex oculatus

Diversity
- 16 species

= Oxyopomyrmex =

Genus of ants

Oxyopomyrmex is a genus of ants in the subfamily Myrmicinae.

== Species ==
- Oxyopomyrmex emeryi Santschi, 1908
- Oxyopomyrmex gaetulus Santschi, 1929
- Oxyopomyrmex insularis Santschi, 1908
- Oxyopomyrmex krueperi Forel, 1911
- Oxyopomyrmex laevibus Salata & Borowiec, 2015
- Oxyopomyrmex lagoi Menozzi, 1936
- Oxyopomyrmex magnus Salata & Borowiec, 2015
- Oxyopomyrmex negevensis Salata & Borowiec, 2015
- Oxyopomyrmex nigripes Santschi, 1907
- Oxyopomyrmex nitidior Santschi, 1910
- Oxyopomyrmex oculatus André, 1881
- Oxyopomyrmex polybotesi Salata & Borowiec, 2015
- Oxyopomyrmex pygmalioni Salata & Borowiec, 2015
- Oxyopomyrmex sabulonis Santschi, 1915
- Oxyopomyrmex santschii Forel, 1904
- Oxyopomyrmex saulcyi Emery, 1889
