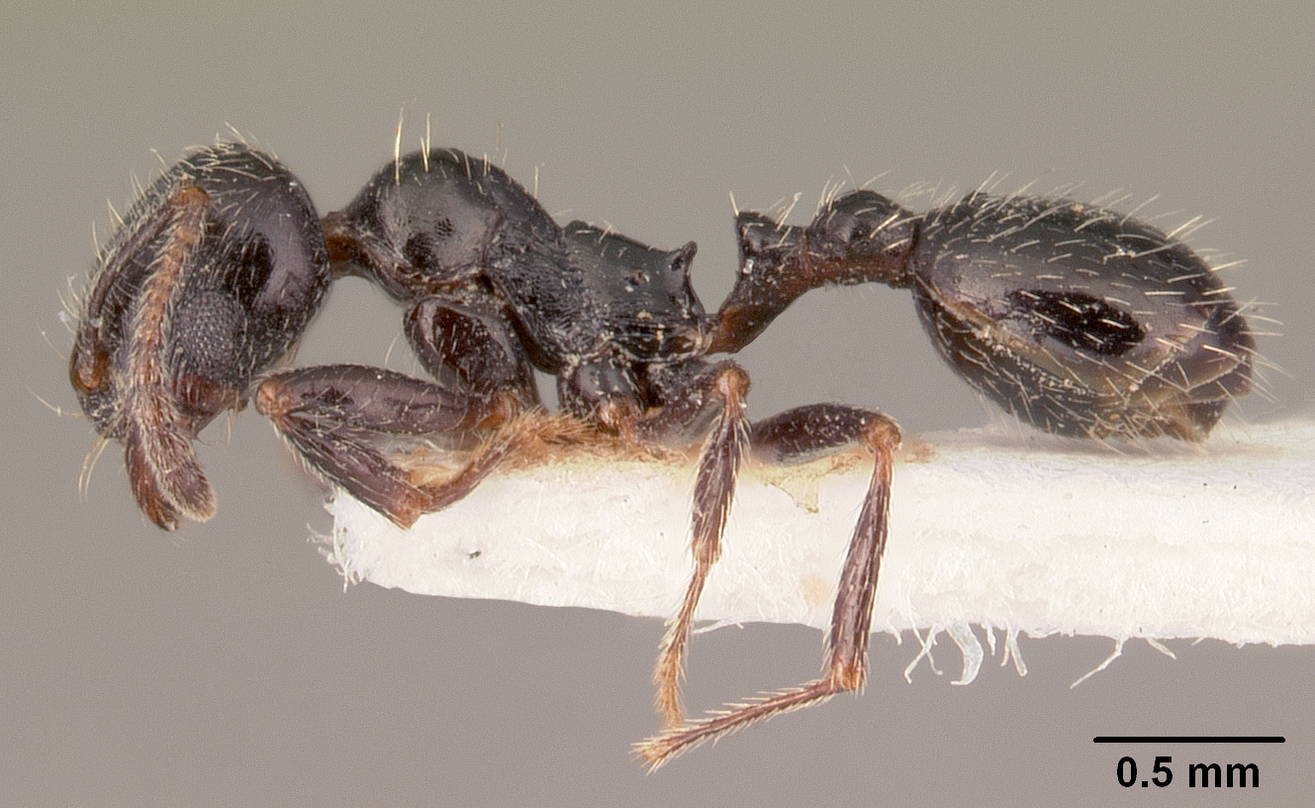
- Goniomma collingwoodi

Scientific classification
- Domain: Eukaryota
- Kingdom: Animalia
- Phylum: Arthropoda
- Class: Insecta
- Order: Hymenoptera
- Family: Formicidae
- Subfamily: Myrmicinae
- Tribe: Stenammini
- Genus: Goniomma; Emery, 1895

Type species
- Aphaenogaster blanci

Diversity
- 8 species

= Goniomma =

Genus of ants

Goniomma is a genus of ants in the subfamily Myrmicinae.

== Species ==
- Goniomma baeticum Reyes, Espadaler & Rodriguez, 1987
- Goniomma blanci (André, 1881)
- Goniomma collingwoodi Espadaler, 1997
- Goniomma compressisquama Tinaut, Ruano, Hidalgo & Ballesta, 1995
- Goniomma decipiens Espadaler, 1997
- Goniomma hispanicum (André, 1883)
- Goniomma kugleri Espadaler, 1986
- Goniomma punicum (Forel, 1907)
