= Stenamma andersoni =

Scientific classification
- Kingdom: Animalia
- Phylum: Arthropoda
- Class: Insecta
- Order: Hymenoptera
- Family: Formicidae
- Subfamily: Myrmicinae
- Genus: Stenamma
- Species: S. andersoni

Binomial name
- Stenamma andersoni Branstetter, 2013

Species of ant

Stenamma andersoni is a Neotropical species of ant in the subfamily Myrmicinae.

The species is known only from a single Berlese sample of sifted leaf litter, which was collected in a cloud forest at 990 m elevation in southern Mexico. Male and gynes are unknown. The two worker specimens, collected in 1987, are somewhat faded in color and were not usable for molecular phylogenetic work. With morphology alone, it is not clear to which species Stenamma andersoni is most closely related, but Branstetter (2013) hypothesizes that it is probably near Stenamma crypticum or Stenamma huachucanum.

Stenamma andersoni should be easy to separate from similar species by its smooth head and pronotum, unique pronotum shape, and thickened gastral setae.
