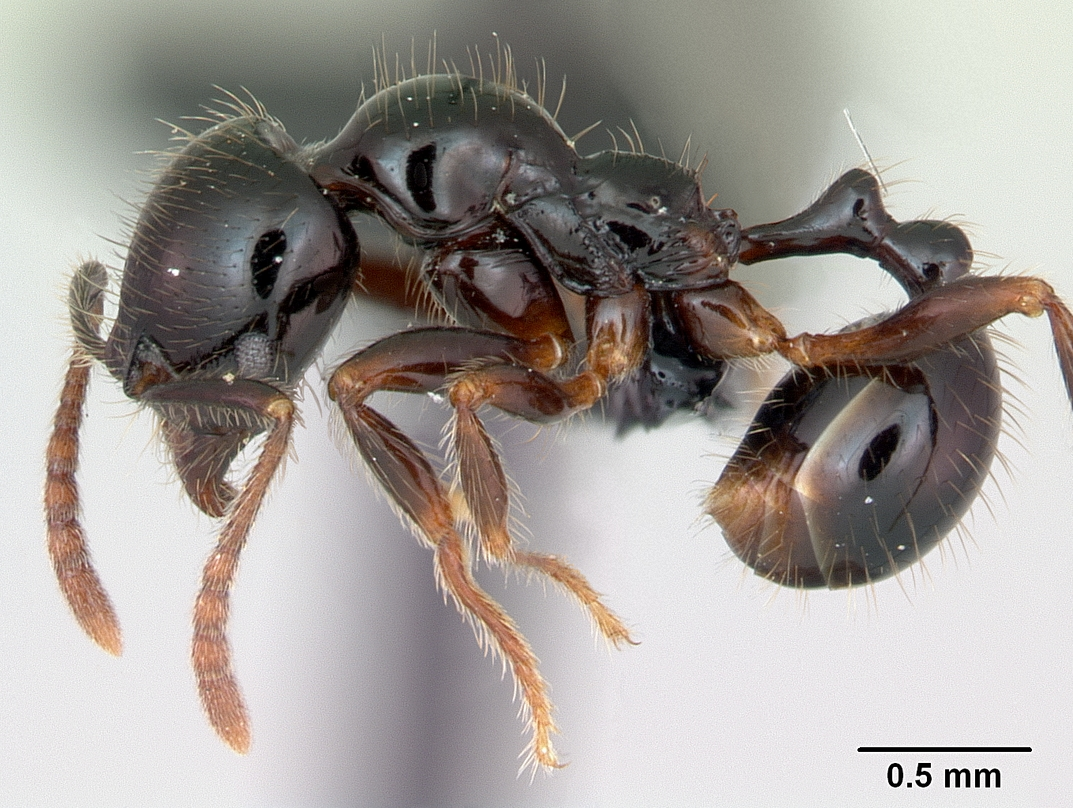
- S. expolitum worker from Costa Rica

Scientific classification
- Domain: Eukaryota
- Kingdom: Animalia
- Phylum: Arthropoda
- Class: Insecta
- Order: Hymenoptera
- Family: Formicidae
- Subfamily: Myrmicinae
- Genus: Stenamma
- Species: S. expolitum

Binomial name
- Stenamma expolitum M. R. Smith, 1962

= Stenamma expolitum =

Species of ant

Stenamma expolitum is a species of ant native to the wet forests of Costa Rica at elevations of 800 metres (2,600 ft).

== Description ==
The species have black legs and a dorsal face which have a transverse rugae. It propodeum is identical in brightness to promesonotum.

== Habitat ==
The species is found on clay banks, along the streams, and on hillsides.
