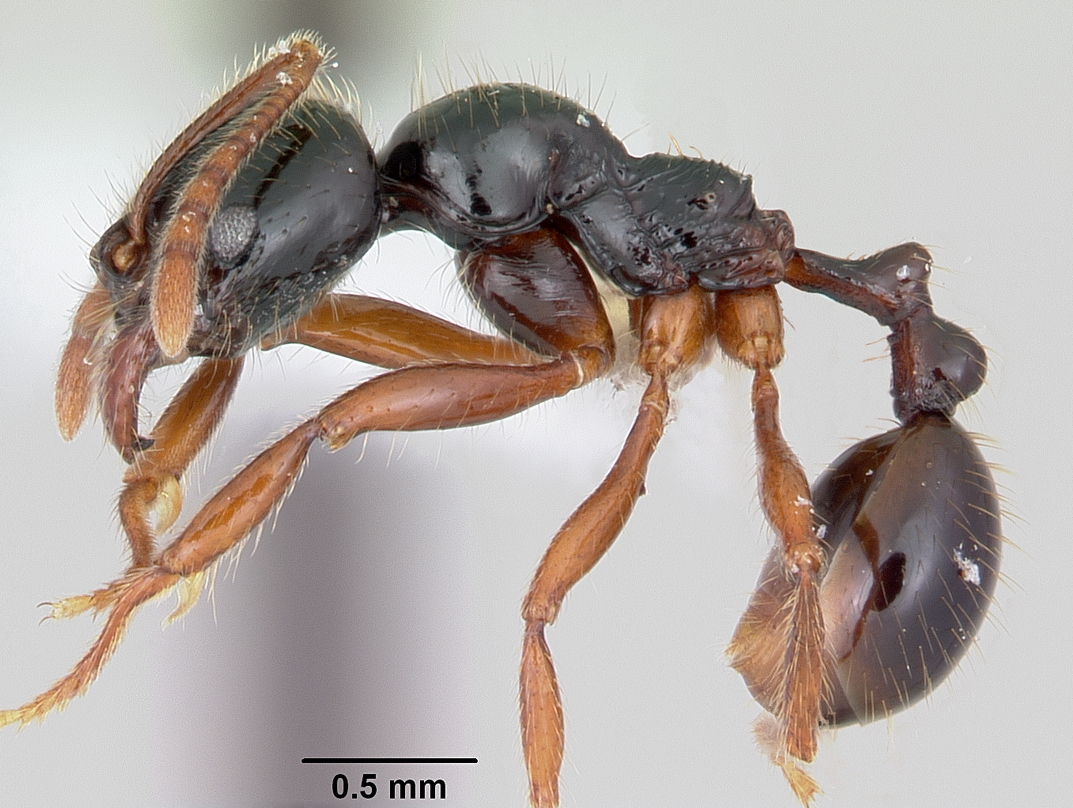
- S. alas worker from Costa Rica

Scientific classification
- Kingdom: Animalia
- Phylum: Arthropoda
- Class: Insecta
- Order: Hymenoptera
- Family: Formicidae
- Subfamily: Myrmicinae
- Tribe: Stenammini
- Genus: Stenamma; Westwood, 1839

Type species
- Stenamma westwoodii

Diversity
- 85 species

= Stenamma =

Genus of ants

Stenamma is a genus of cryptic leaf-litter ants that occurs in mesic forest habitats throughout the Holarctic region, Central America, and part of northwestern South America (Colombia and Ecuador).

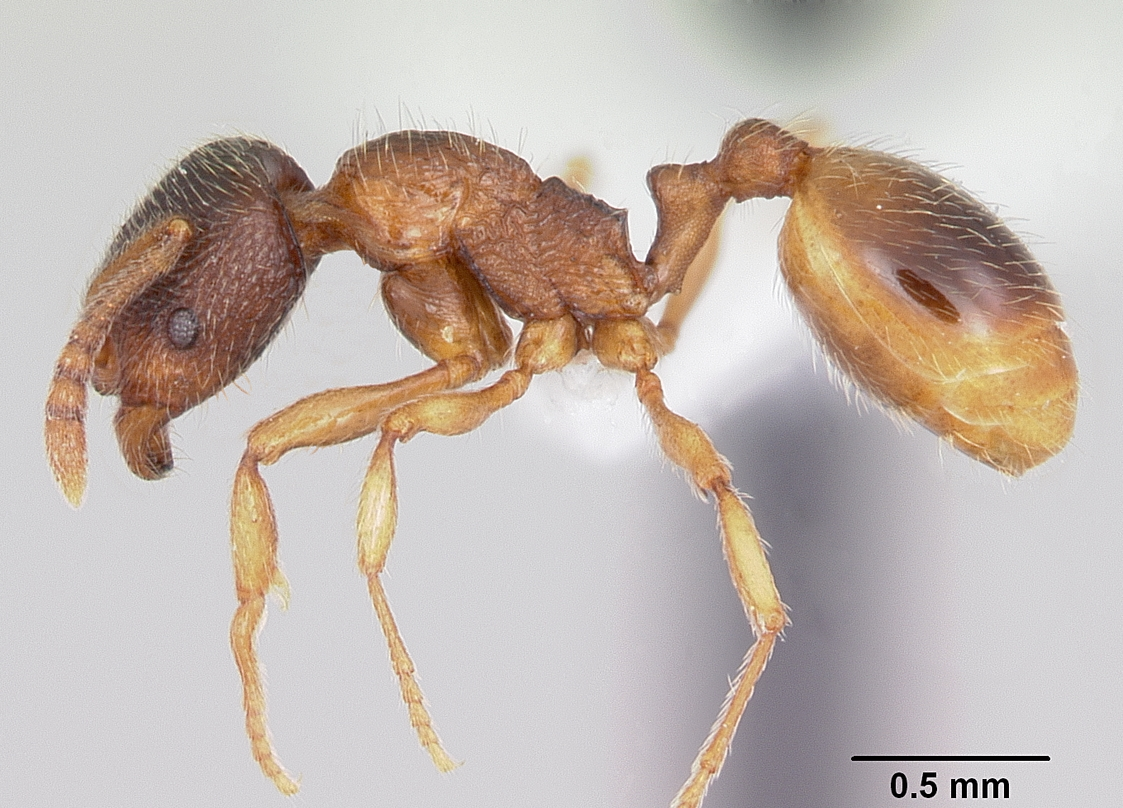
Stenamma chiricahua

== Species ==
These 44 species belong to the genus Stenamma:

- Stenamma africanum Santschi, 1939
- Stenamma andersoni Branstetter, 2013
- †Stenamma berendti (Mayr, 1868)
- Stenamma bhutanense Baroni Urbani, 1977
- Stenamma brevicorne (Mayr, 1886)
- Stenamma californicum Snelling, 1973
- Stenamma carolinense Smith, 1951
- Stenamma chiricahua Snelling, 1973
- Stenamma debile (Foerster, 1850)
- Stenamma diecki Emery, 1895
- Stenamma diversum Mann, 1922
- Stenamma dyscheres Snelling, 1973
- Stenamma exasperatum Snelling, 1973
- Stenamma expolitum Smith, 1962
- Stenamma felixi Mann, 1922
- Stenamma fovolocephalum Smith, 1930
- Stenamma georgii Arnol'di, 1975
- Stenamma heathi Wheeler, 1915
- Stenamma hissarianum Arnol'di, 1975
- Stenamma huachucanum Smith, 1957
- Stenamma impar Forel, 1901
- Stenamma kashmirense Baroni Urbani, 1977
- Stenamma kurilense Arnol'di, 1975
- Stenamma lippulum (Nylander, 1849)
- Stenamma manni Wheeler, 1914
- Stenamma meridionale Smith, 1957
- Stenamma nipponense Yasumatsu & Murakami, 1960
- Stenamma orousseti Casevitz-Weulersse, 1990
- Stenamma owstoni Wheeler, 1906
- Stenamma petiolatum Emery, 1897
- Stenamma picetojuglandeti Arnol'di, 1975
- Stenamma punctatoventre Snelling, 1973
- Stenamma punctiventre Emery, 1908
- Stenamma sardoum Emery, 1915
- Stenamma schmidti Menozzi, 1931
- Stenamma schmitti Wheeler, 1903
- Stenamma sequoiarum Wheeler, 1917
- Stenamma smithi Cole, 1966
- Stenamma snellingi Bolton, 1995
- Stenamma sogdianum Arnol'di, 1975
- Stenamma striatulum Emery, 1895
- Stenamma ussuriense Arnol'di, 1975
- Stenamma westwoodii Westwood, 1839
- Stenamma wheelerorum Snelling, 1973

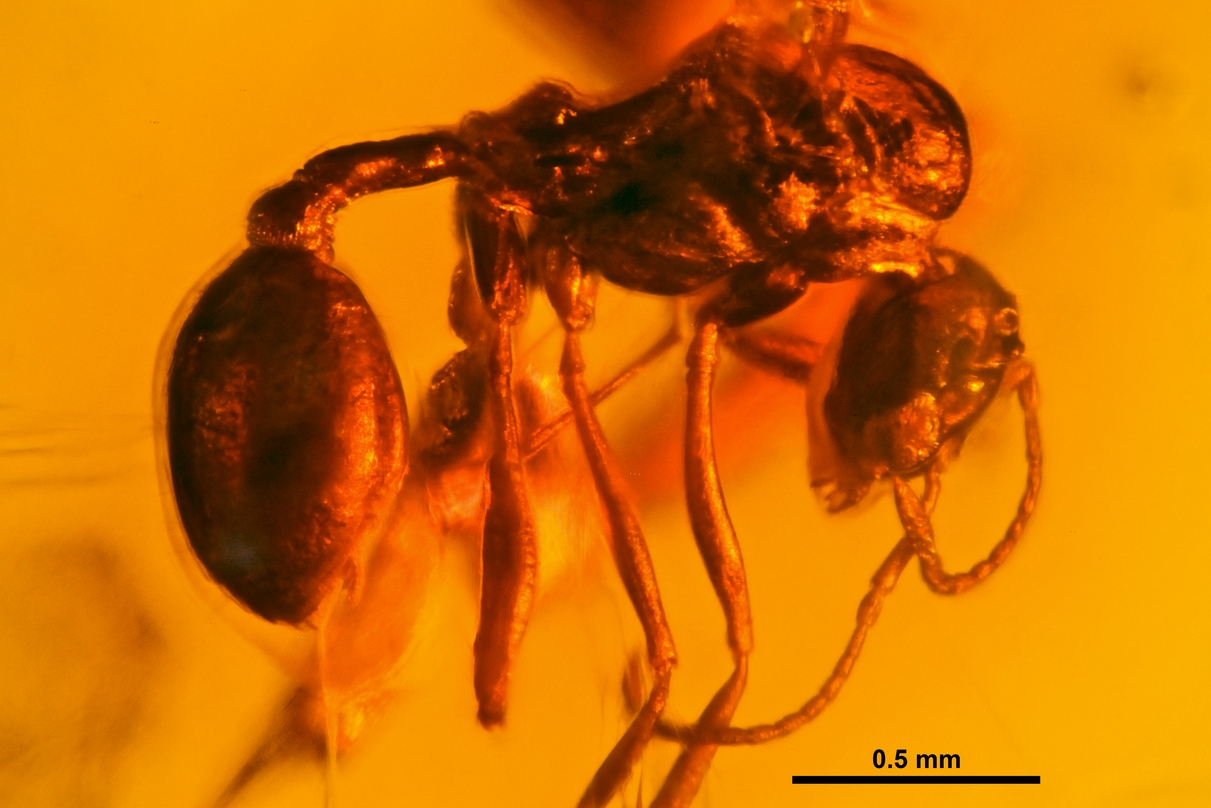
†Stenamma berendti
