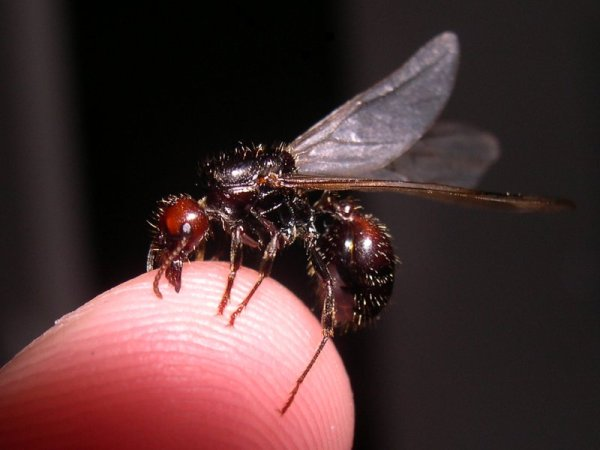
- Messor barbarus queen with wings still attached

Scientific classification
- Kingdom: Animalia
- Phylum: Arthropoda
- Class: Insecta
- Order: Hymenoptera
- Family: Formicidae
- Subfamily: Myrmicinae
- Tribe: Stenammini; Ashmead, 1905

Type genus
- Stenamma Westwood, 1839

Diversity
- c. 7 extant genera 1 fossil genus

= Stenammini =

Tribe of ants

Stenammini is a tribe of Myrmicine ants with 6 genera and 1 fossil genus. Many genera in this tribe are known to collect seeds.

== Genera ==
=== Extant ===
- Aphaenogaster Mayr, 1853
- Goniomma Emery, 1895
- Messor Forel, 1890
- Novomessor Emery, 1915
- Oxyopomyrmex André, 1881
- Stenamma Westwood, 1839
- Veromessor Forel, 1917

=== Extinct ===
- †Paraphaenogaster Dlussky, 1981
