= List of Brachymyrmex species =

This is a list of ants in the genus Brachymyrmex. As of 2014, Brachymyrmex contains 40 species.

== Species ==
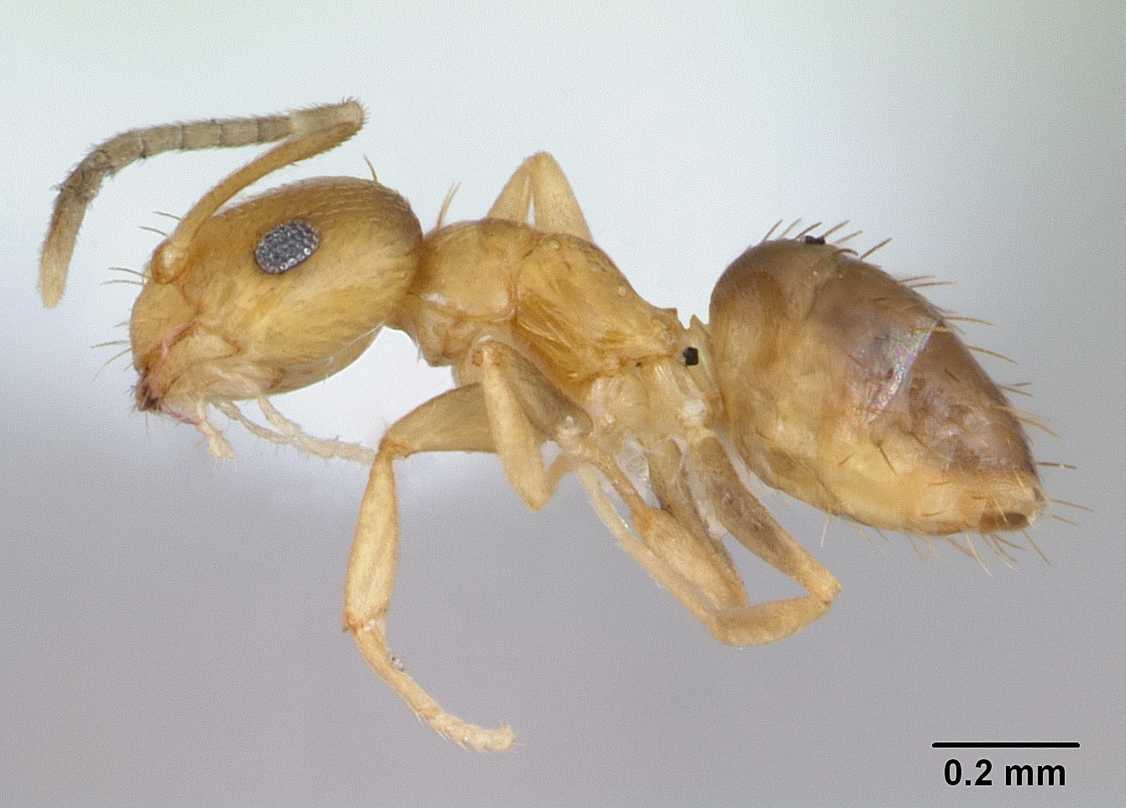
Brachymyrmex aphidicola

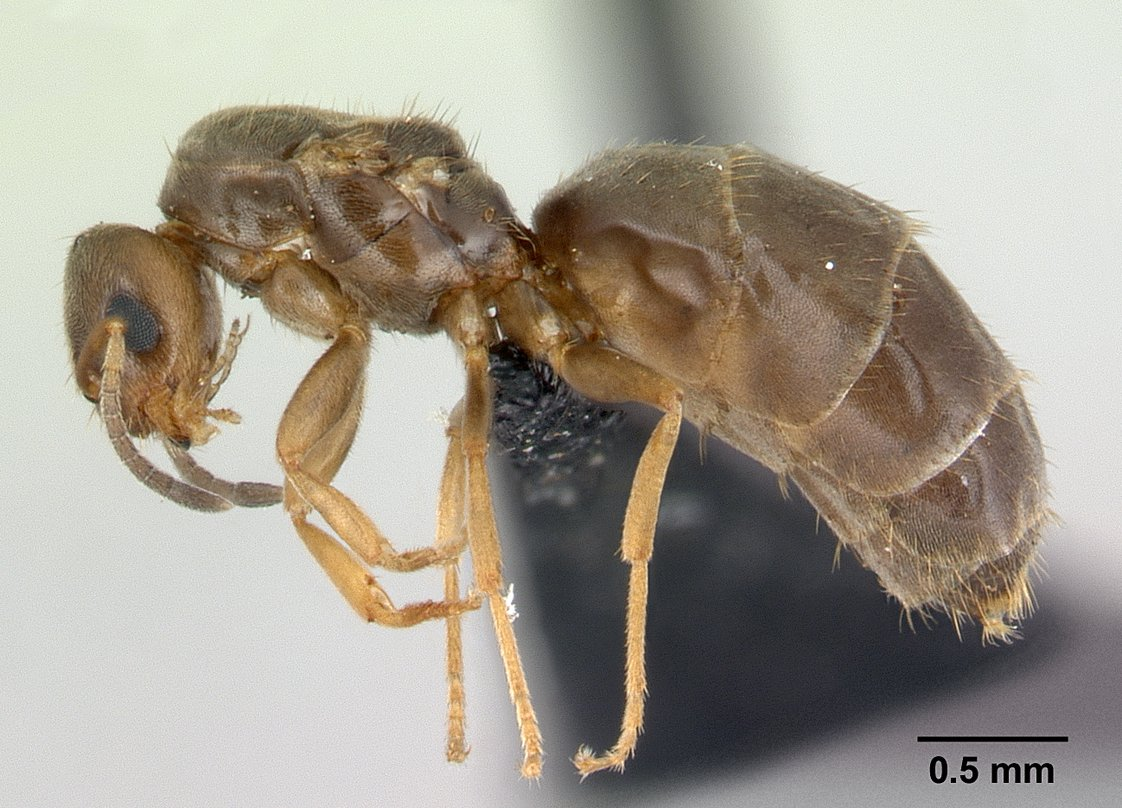
Brachymyrmex cordemoyi

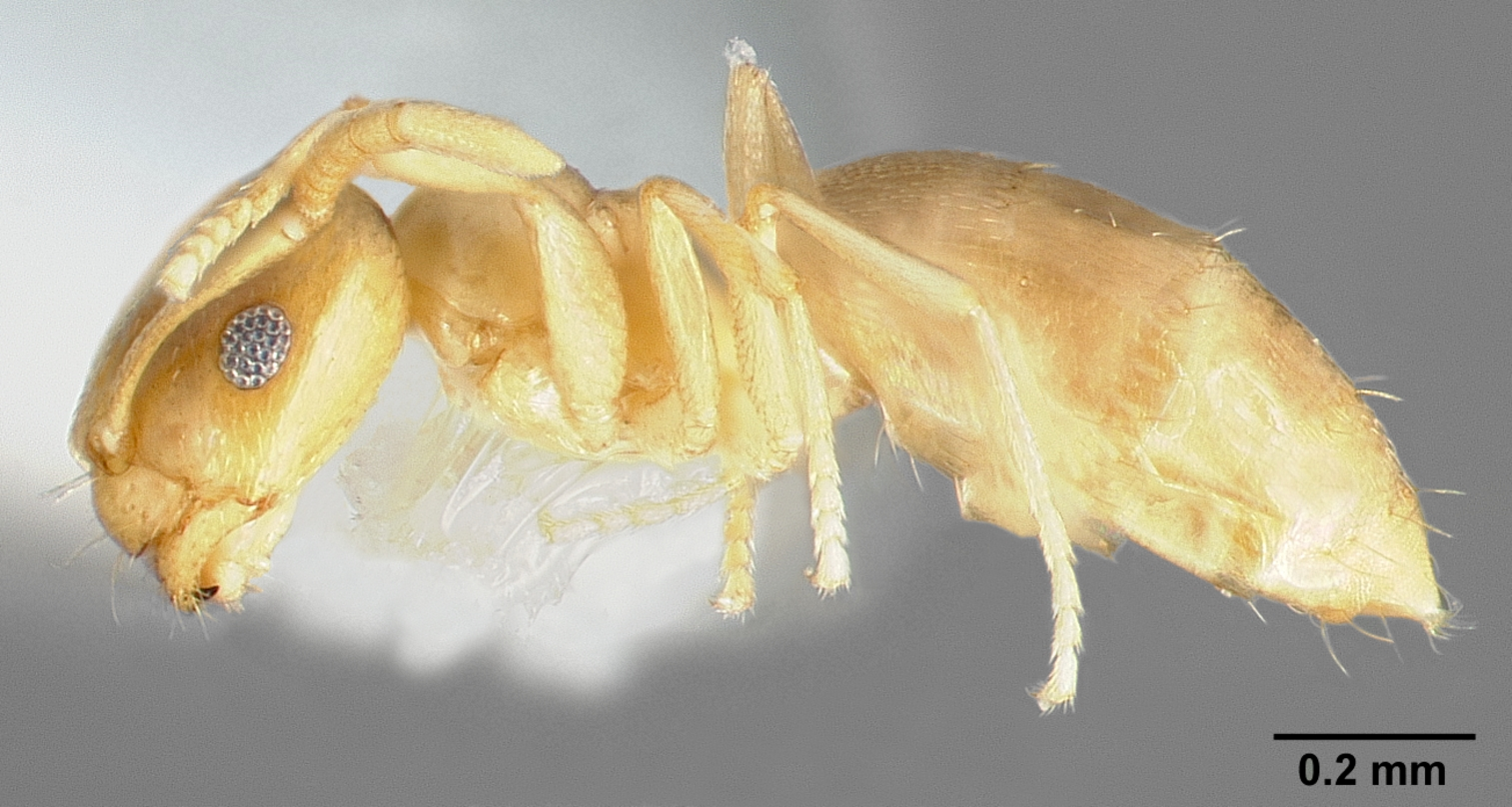
Brachymyrmex depilis

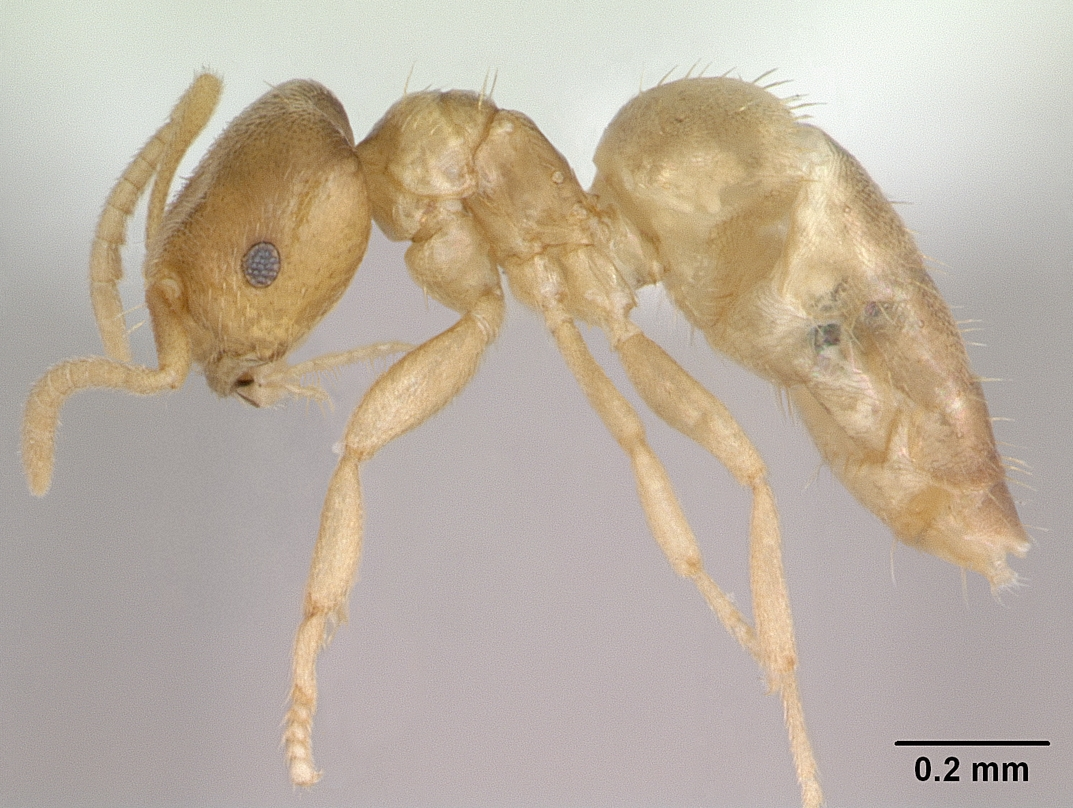
Brachymyrmex fiebrigi

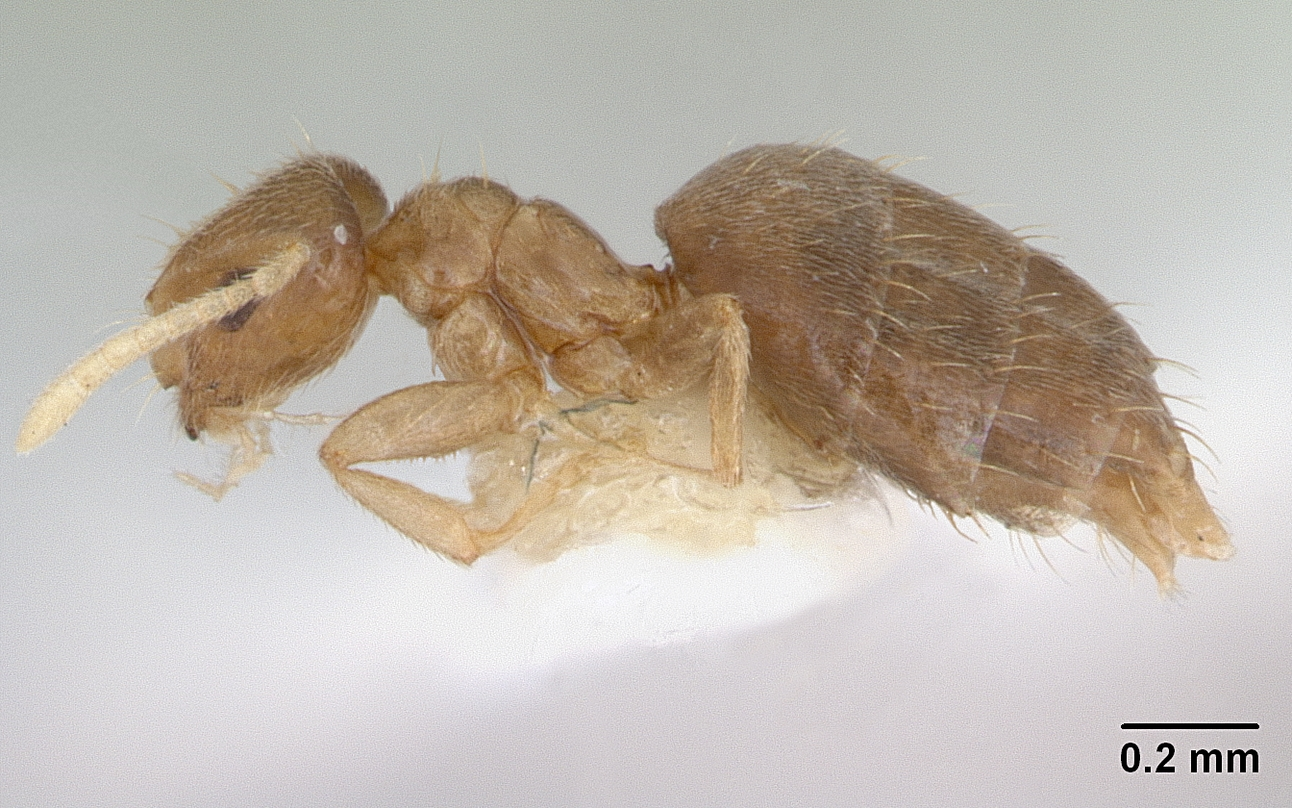
Brachymyrmex heeri

- Brachymyrmex admotus Mayr, 1887
- Brachymyrmex antennatus Santschi, 1929
- Brachymyrmex aphidicola Forel, 1909
- Brachymyrmex attenuatus Santschi, 1929
- Brachymyrmex australis Forel, 1901
- Brachymyrmex bahamensis Ortiz-Sepúlveda et al., 2019
- Brachymyrmex bicolor Ortiz-Sepúlveda et al., 2019
- Brachymyrmex bonariensis Santschi, 1933
- Brachymyrmex brasiliensis Ortiz & Fernández, 2014
- Brachymyrmex bruchi Forel, 1912
- Brachymyrmex cavernicola Wheeler, 1938
- Brachymyrmex coactus Mayr, 1887
- Brachymyrmex cordemoyi Forel, 1895
- Brachymyrmex degener Emery, 1906
- Brachymyrmex delabiei Ortiz & Fernández, 2014
- Brachymyrmex depilis Emery, 1893
- Brachymyrmex donisthorpei Santschi, 1939
- Brachymyrmex feitosai Ortiz & Fernández, 2014
- Brachymyrmex fiebrigi Forel, 1908
- Brachymyrmex flavidulus (Roger, 1863)
- Brachymyrmex gagates Wheeler, 1934
- Brachymyrmex gaucho Santschi, 1917
- Brachymyrmex giardi Emery, 1895
- Brachymyrmex heeri Forel, 1874
- Brachymyrmex iridescens Ortiz-Sepúlveda et al., 2019
- Brachymyrmex micromegas Emery, 1923
- Brachymyrmex minutus Forel, 1893
- Brachymyrmex modestus Santschi, 1923
- Brachymyrmex musculus Forel, 1899
- Brachymyrmex myops Emery, 1906
- Brachymyrmex nebulosus LaPolla & Longino, 2006
- Brachymyrmex obscurior Forel, 1893
- Brachymyrmex oculatus Santschi, 1919
- Brachymyrmex patagonicus Mayr, 1868
- Brachymyrmex pictus Mayr, 1887
- Brachymyrmex pilipes Mayr, 1887
- Brachymyrmex santschii Menozzi, 1927
- Brachymyrmex sosai Ortiz-Sepúlveda et al., 2019
- Brachymyrmex termitophilus Forel, 1895
- Brachymyrmex tristis Mayr, 1870
