= B. musculus =

The binomial abbreviation B. musculus may refer to:

- Balaenoptera musculus, the blue whale
- Baiomys musculus, the Mexican pygmy mouse
- Brachymyrmex musculus, a species of Formicine ant
