= Pterygodermatites ondatrae =

Scientific classification
- Domain: Eukaryota
- Kingdom: Animalia
- Phylum: Nematoda
- Class: Chromadorea
- Order: Rhabditida
- Family: Rictulariidae
- Genus: Pterygodermatites
- Species: P. ondatrae

Binomial name
- Pterygodermatites ondatrae Chandler, 1941

Species of roundworm

Pterygodermatites ondatrae is a species of parasitic nematode in the genus Pterygodermatites. It has been recorded in the hispid cotton rat (Sigmodon hispidus) in Florida and Texas. In Florida, it has also been recorded on the marsh rice rat (Oryzomys palustris), together with an unnamed species of the same genus, the female of which cannot be distinguished from that of P. ondatrae.

== See also ==
- List of parasites of the marsh rice rat

== Literature cited ==
- Kinsella, J.M. 1974. Comparison of helminth parasites of the cotton rat, Sigmodon hispidus, from several habitats in Florida. American Museum Novitates 2540:1–12.
- Kinsella, J.M. 1988. Comparison of helminths of rice rats, Oryzomys palustris, from freshwater and saltwater marshes in Florida. Proceedings of the Helminthological Society of Washington 55(2):275–280.
