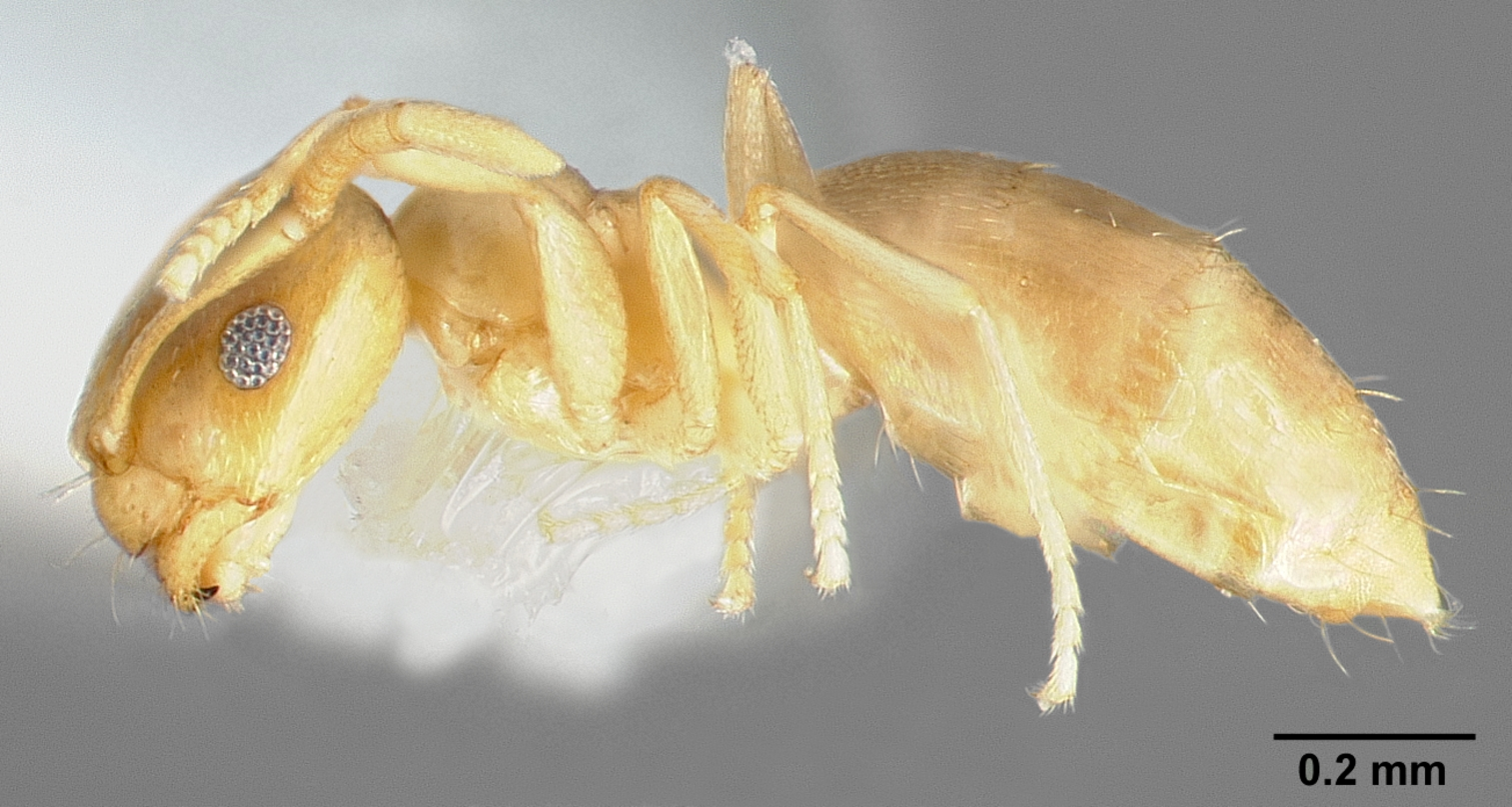

Scientific classification
- Kingdom: Animalia
- Phylum: Arthropoda
- Class: Insecta
- Order: Hymenoptera
- Family: Formicidae
- Subfamily: Formicinae
- Genus: Brachymyrmex
- Species: B. depilis

Binomial name
- Brachymyrmex depilis Emery, 1893

Synonyms
- Brachymyrmex depilis flavescens Grundmann, 1952; Brachymyrmex nanellus Wheeler, 1902

= Brachymyrmex depilis =

Species of ant

Brachymyrmex depilis is a species of Formicine ant native to North America.

== Taxonomy ==
The subspecies Brachymyrmex depilis flavescens was described by Grundmann in 1952, however a 2019 study found no significant morphological differences for two different subspecies to be considered. The same study also concluded Brachymyrmex nanellus (Wheeler, 1903) to be a synonym of this species.

== Gallery ==
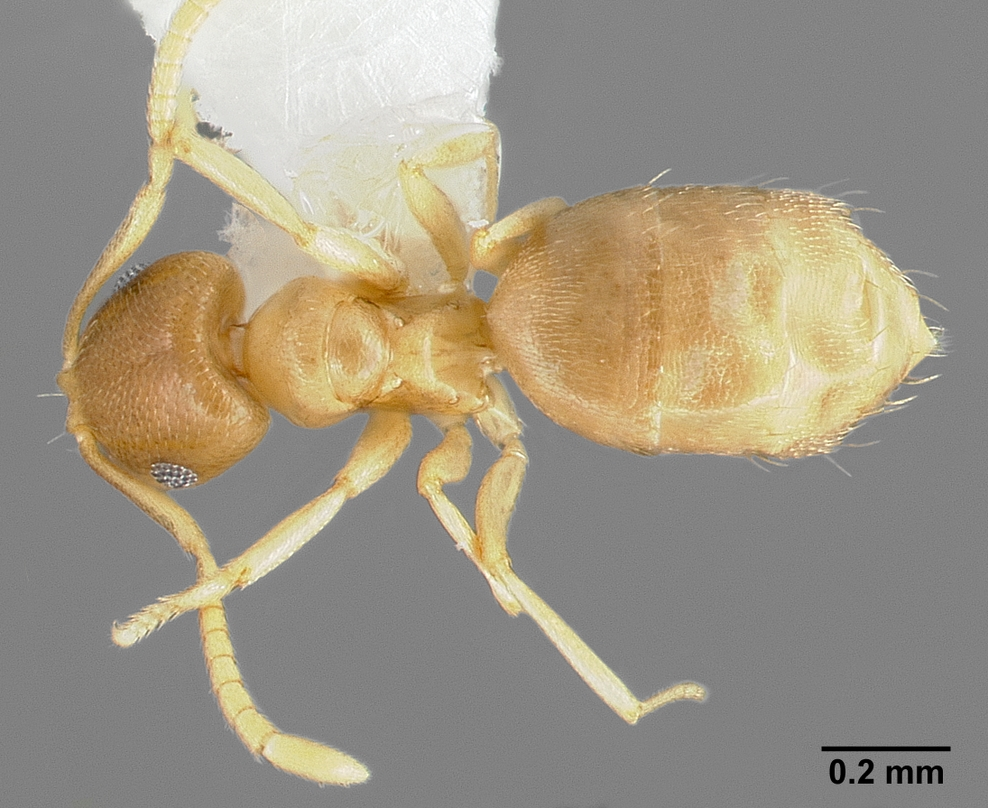

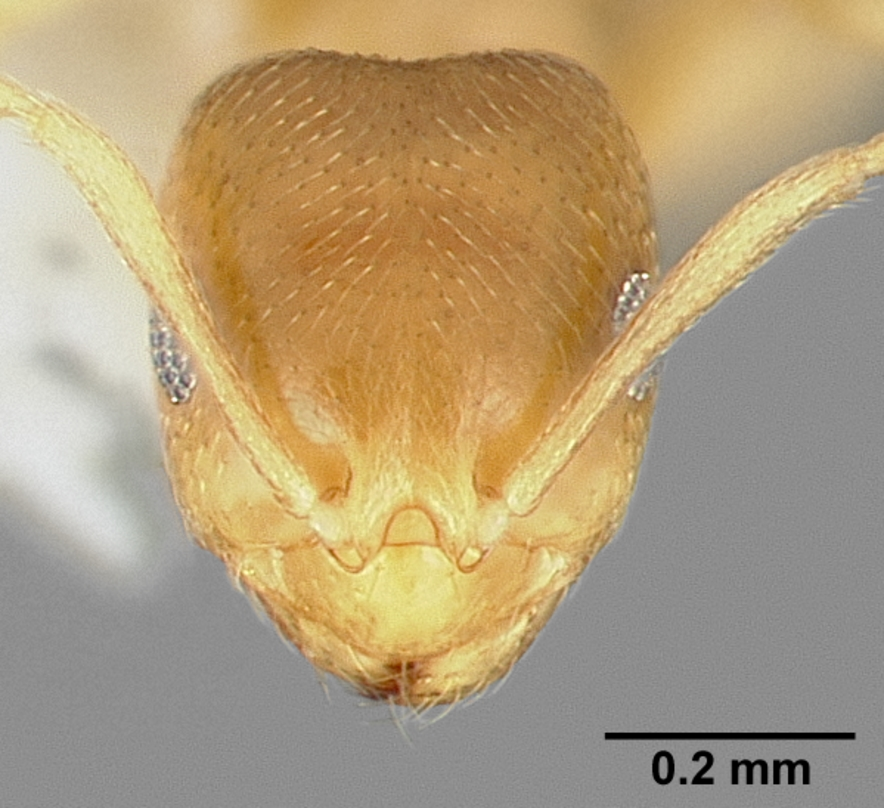

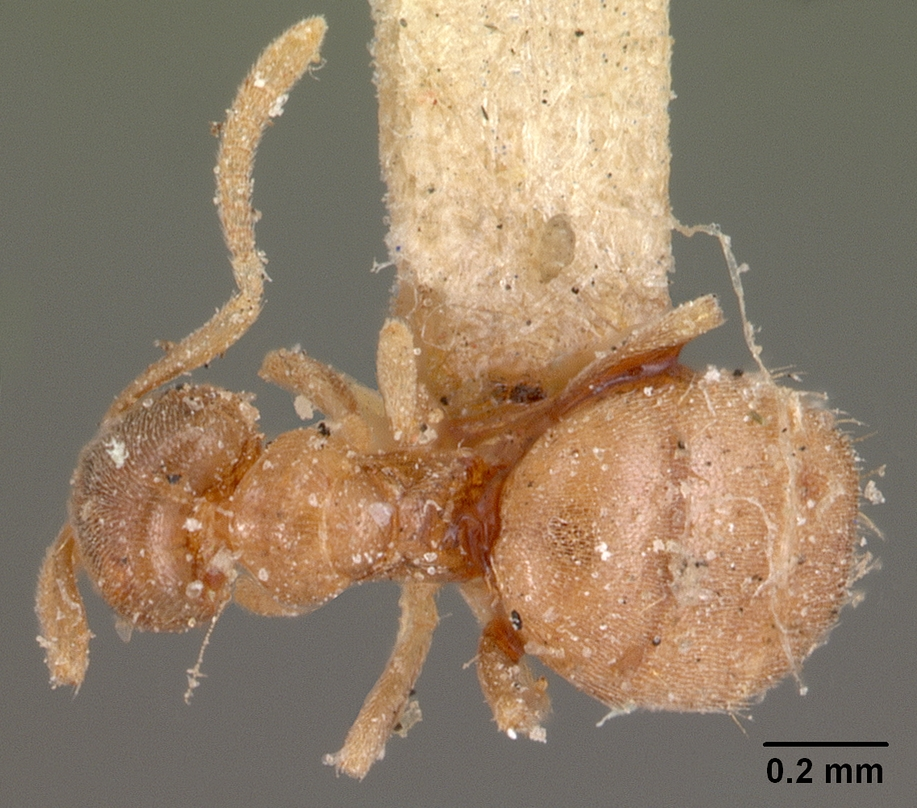

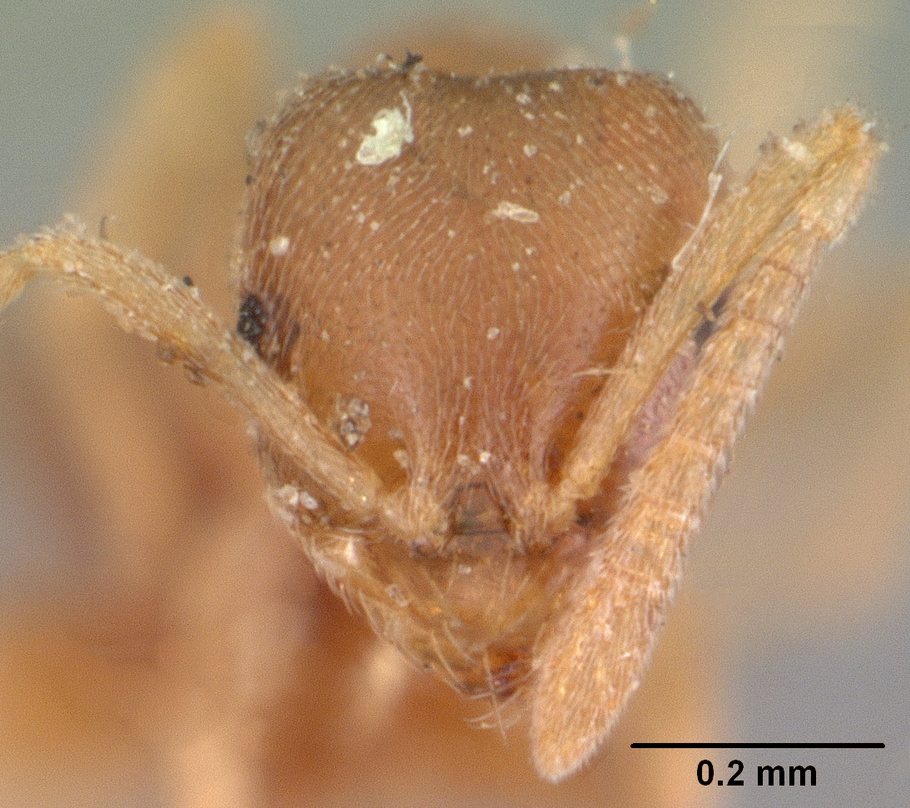

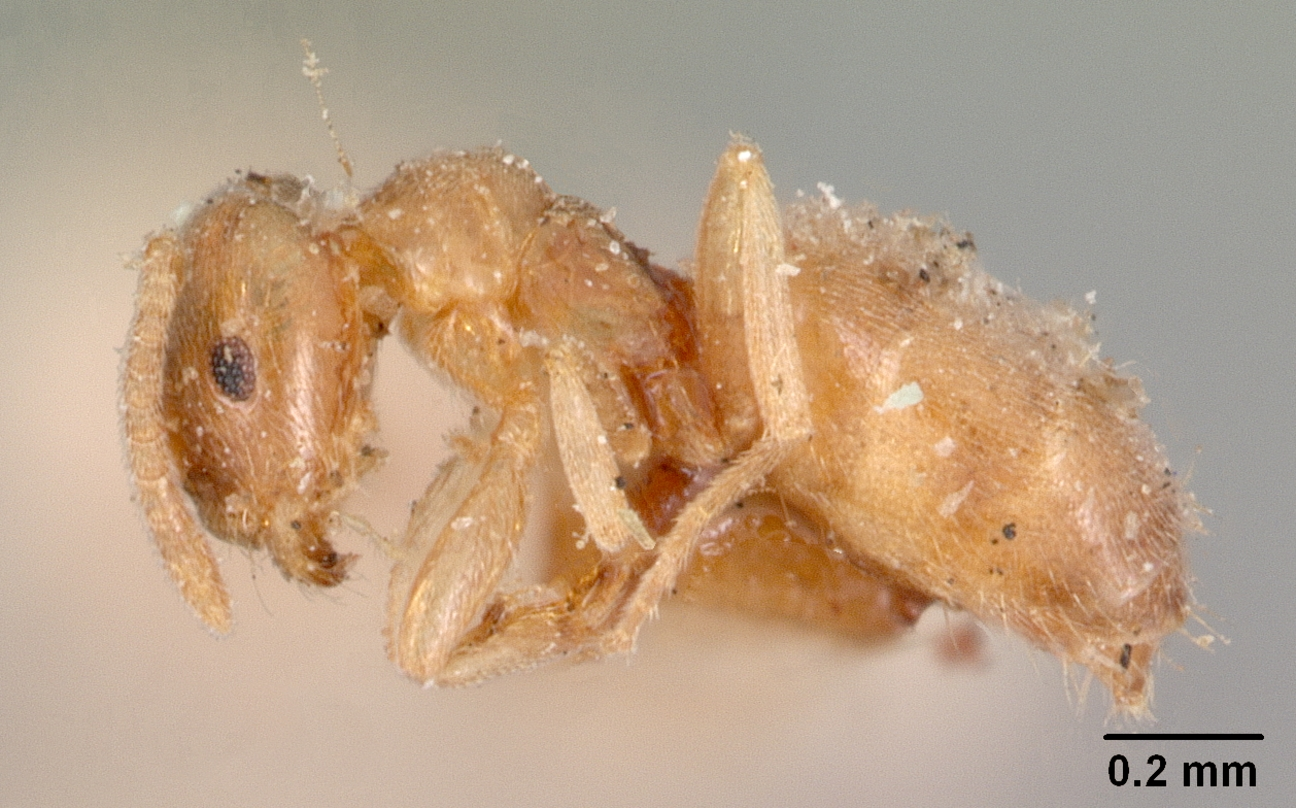

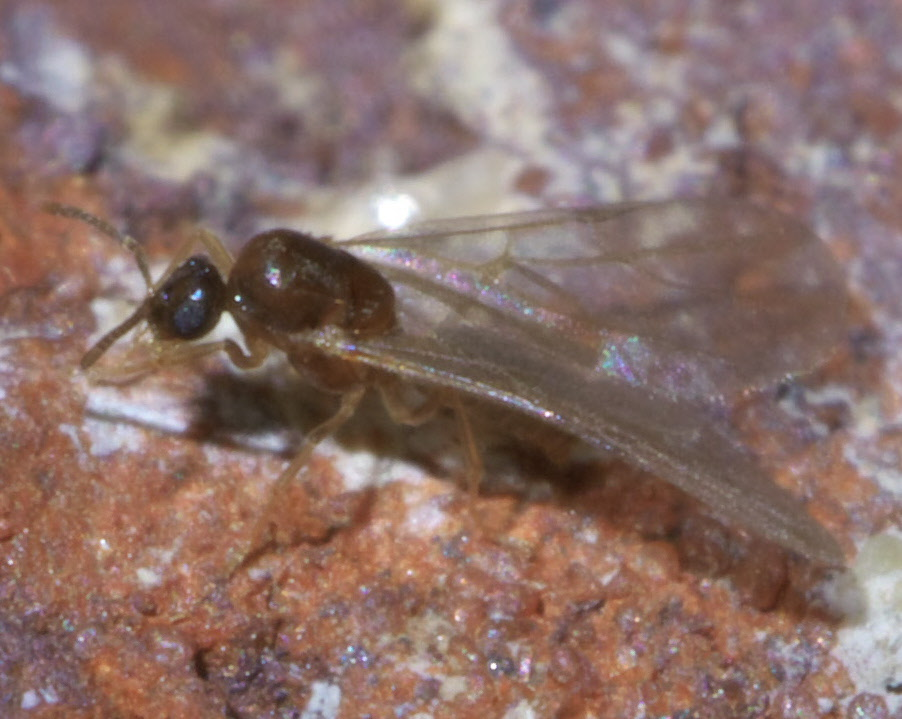

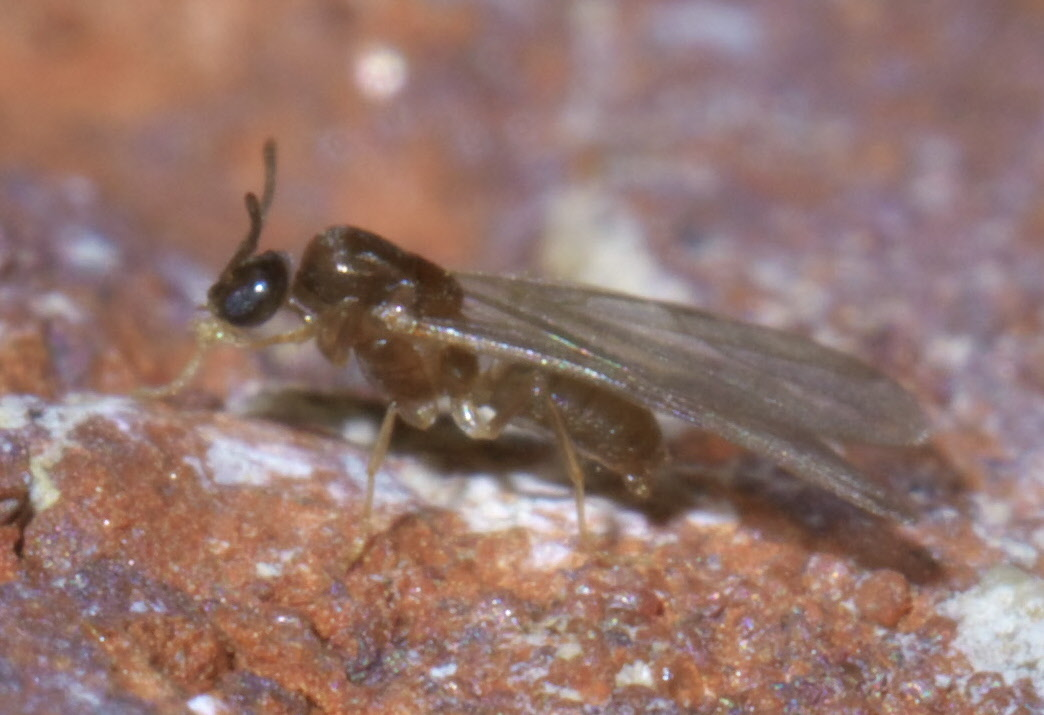

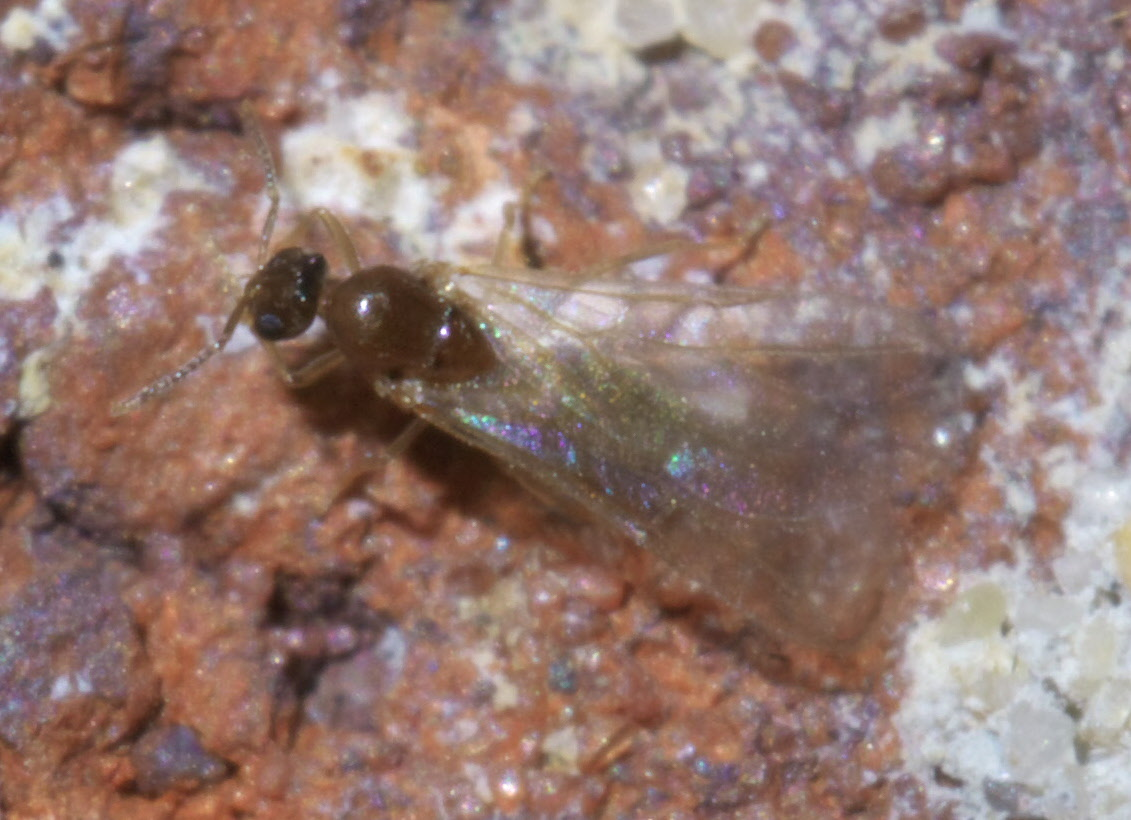

== See also ==
- List of Brachymyrmex species
