= Brachymyrmex brevicornis =

Scientific classification
- Domain: Eukaryota
- Kingdom: Animalia
- Phylum: Arthropoda
- Class: Insecta
- Order: Hymenoptera
- Family: Formicidae
- Subfamily: Formicinae
- Genus: Brachymyrmex
- Species: B. brevicornis

Binomial name
- Brachymyrmex brevicornis Emery, 1906

Species of ant

Brachymyrmex brevicornis is a species of ant in the family Formicidae.
