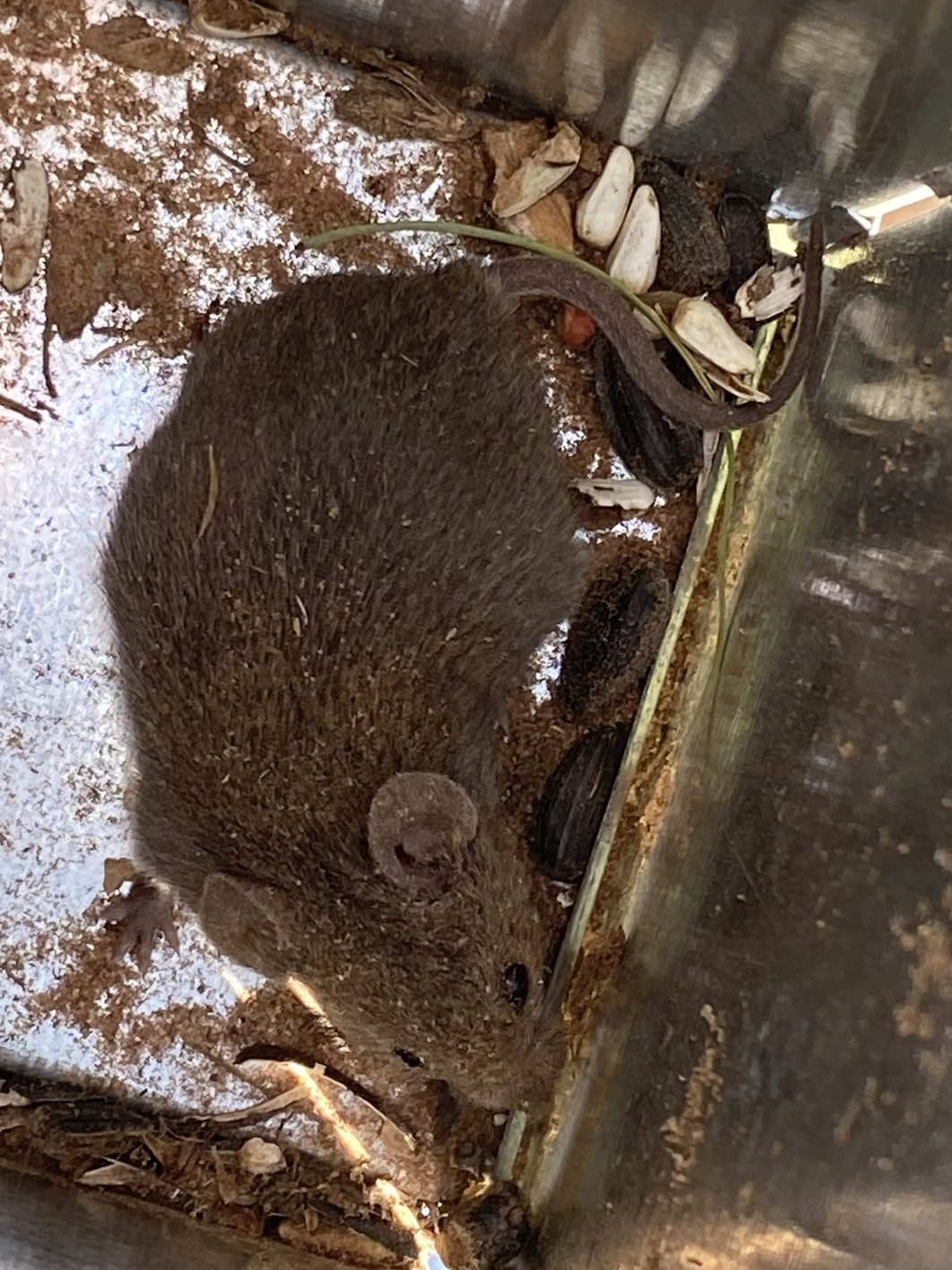

Conservation status
- Least Concern (IUCN 3.1)

Scientific classification
- Kingdom: Animalia
- Phylum: Chordata
- Class: Mammalia
- Order: Rodentia
- Family: Cricetidae
- Subfamily: Neotominae
- Genus: Baiomys
- Species: B. taylori

Binomial name
- Baiomys taylori (Thomas, 1887)

Synonyms
- Hesperomys taylori Thomas, 1887; Peromyscus taylori (Thomas, 1887); Cricetus taylori (Thomas, 1887); Peromyscus paulus J. A. Allen, 1903; Peromyscus allex Osgood, 1904

= Northern pygmy mouse =

Species of rodent

The northern pygmy mouse (Baiomys taylori) is a species of rodent in the family Cricetidae. It is known as ratón-pigmeo norteño in the Spanish-speaking areas of its range. It is found in Mexico and the United States. It is the smallest rodent in North America.

== Taxonomy ==
This species was originally described as a member of the genus Hesperomys. Afterwards it would be placed in the genus Peromyscus and even the hamster genus Cricetus. In 1907, the American naturalist Edgar Mearns elevated the subgenus Baiomys to genus-level and included this species in it alongside B. musculus. It is likely more recent than B. musculus and B. brunneus, as it less closely resembles fossil members of this genus.

There are seven subspecies:

- B. t. allex (Osgood, 1904 - native to the lowlands of southernmost Nayarit, western Jalisco, Colima, and southwestern Michoacán
- B. t. analogus (Osgood, 1917) - native to northern Michoacán, eastern Jalisco, Guanajuato, Querétaro, Estado de México, Mexico City, southeasternmost San Luis Potosí, Hidalgo, central Puebla and a small part of central Veracruz
- B. t. ater Blossom & Burt, 1942 - native to southeastern Arizona, southwestern New Mexico, northernmost Sonora, and northeastern Chihuahua
- B. t. canutus Packard, 1960 - native to southern Sonora, Sinaloa, and western Nayarit
- B. t. fuliginatus Packard, 1960 - native to a small region of eastern San Luis Potosí in the Sierra Madre Orientals
- B. t. paulus (J. A. Allen, 1903) - native to western Chihuahua, central Durango, southwestern Nayarit, northern and central Jalisco, Aguascalientes, and southern Zacatecas
- B. t. taylori (Thomas, 1887) northern Veracruz, southeastern San Luis Potosí, Tamaulipas, northern Nuevo León, northeastern Coahuila, southern and central Texas, southern Oklahoma, and southwestern Louisiana

The subspecies B. t. subater (V. O. Bailey, 1905) from eastern Texas and westernmost Louisiana was found to be synonymous with B. t. taylori in 2016.

== Description ==
The average size of an adult male is approximately 7.5 grams (0.26 oz), while adult females can weigh up to 9.4 grams (0.33 oz). The average length of an adult (across all subspecies) is 64.1 millimetres (2.52 in) for body length and 42 millimetres (1.7 in) for tail length. Keeping with Bergmann's rule, northern populations and high-altitude populations are larger than southern and low-altitude populations. B. t. allex, the southernmost subspecies, is the smallest subspecies, with an average total body length (including the tail) of 100 millimetres (3.9 in). The largest subspecies, B. t. analogus and B. t. fuliginatus, have average total body lengths of 109 millimetres (4.3 in) and 105.5 millimetres (4.15 in), respectively.

Species range from light brown to reddish brown to an almost black color. Their undersides range from white to grayish. Darker specimens tend to be from high-humidity and high-altitude habitats, while paler mice are from low-humidity and low-altitude habitats. analogus and fuliginatus, as well as eastern taylori, are darker, canutus, allex, and southern and eastern taylori are pale, and ater and paulus are reddish brown to match the soil they live on. Juveniles have a distinctly gray fur before shedding into their adult coloration. Both albinism and melanism have been recorded in this species.

== Reproduction ==
The pygmy mouse has litters of 1 to 5 pups, with an average of 3. The gestation time for pregnant females is less than 20 days. Unlike many other rodents, father pygmy mice will care for offspring, and groom and huddle over young. These species breed year-round, but breeding is reduced in winter and early spring months. Nests typically occur underneath logs or cacti. The nest is ball-like and made of cactus fibers, corn silk, and grasses. Both males and females care for the young.

A 1976 study showed that B. t. ater raised by the house mouse Mus musculus had a greater tendency to have positive interactions with their "foster" species, and reacted more negatively to open spaces. This indicates that the behavior of these species are influenced to some degree by learned behavior as young. The M. musculus raised by B. taylori "foster parents" were not significantly impacted behaviorally.

== Communication ==
In captivity, these mice will sometimes produce a 'squeal', and use a posture similar to singing mice. There are at least two recorded vocalizations: a high-pitched squeal, and a scolding call given towards males by females with young.

== Ecology ==
These mice are primarily granivorous, feeding mainly on small seeds, but they also consume green vegetation and insects when available. In dry habitats, the primary source of food and water is Opuntia cacti fruit and stems. In captivity they have been observed feeding on insects, the terrestrial snail Helicina orbiculata, and the snake species Rena dulcis and Tropidoclonion lineatum, even when offered vegetative matter.

They are more common in fall and winter and less common during the summer months. The average lifespan in the wild is 5 months, but likely varies across its range. In captivity they can live up to 3 years, but typically only survive slightly longer than 5 months. This species is found across a wide range of habitats, but prefer grasslands or shrubby deserts. They are most associated with grasslands occupied by Opuntia cacti. They form small tunnel-like runways through dense grass cover. B. brunneus and B. musculus prefer highland habitats where their range overlaps with this species, but where the altitudes meet this species is more successful.

Parasites of the northern pygmy mouse include the intestinal nematode Pterygodermatites baiomydis. They are also host to the flea Jellisonia ironsi, the mite Radfordia hamiltoni, and a type of Brucella bacteria; they can not carry Brucella abortus.
