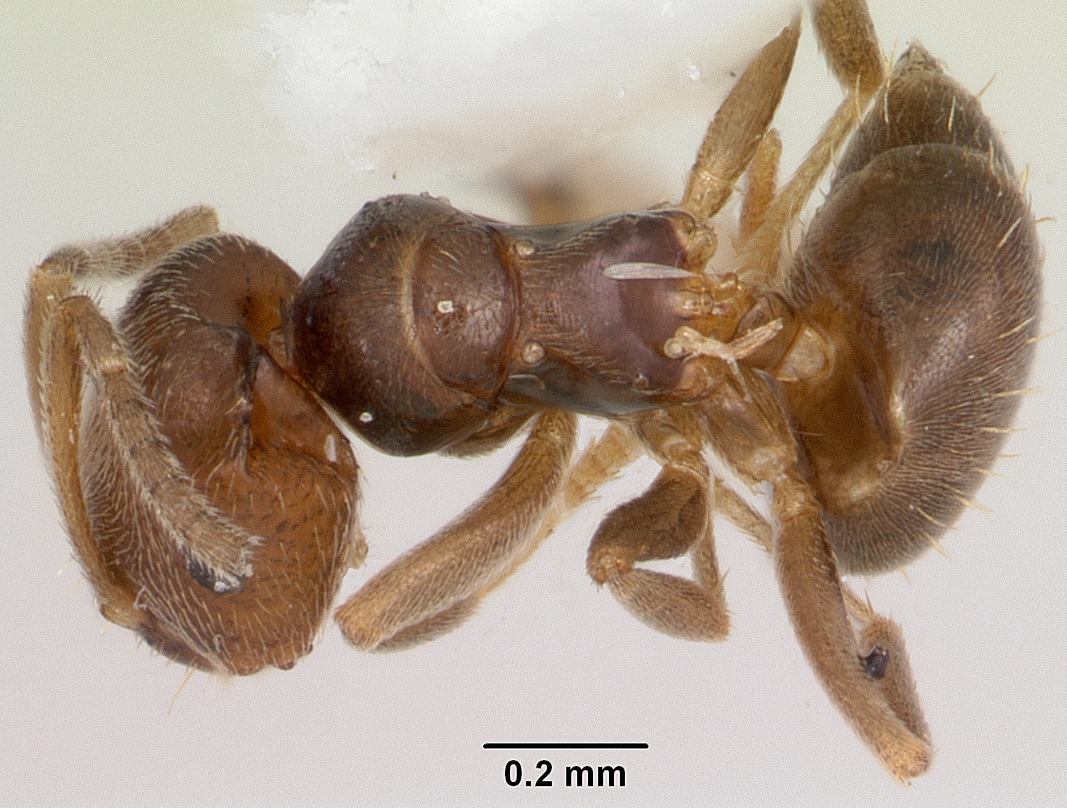

Scientific classification
- Kingdom: Animalia
- Phylum: Arthropoda
- Class: Insecta
- Order: Hymenoptera
- Family: Formicidae
- Subfamily: Formicinae
- Tribe: Myrmelachistini
- Genus: Brachymyrmex
- Species: B. obscurior

Binomial name
- Brachymyrmex obscurior Forel, 1893

= Brachymyrmex obscurior =

Species of ant

Brachymyrmex obscurior is a species of ant in the family Formicidae.

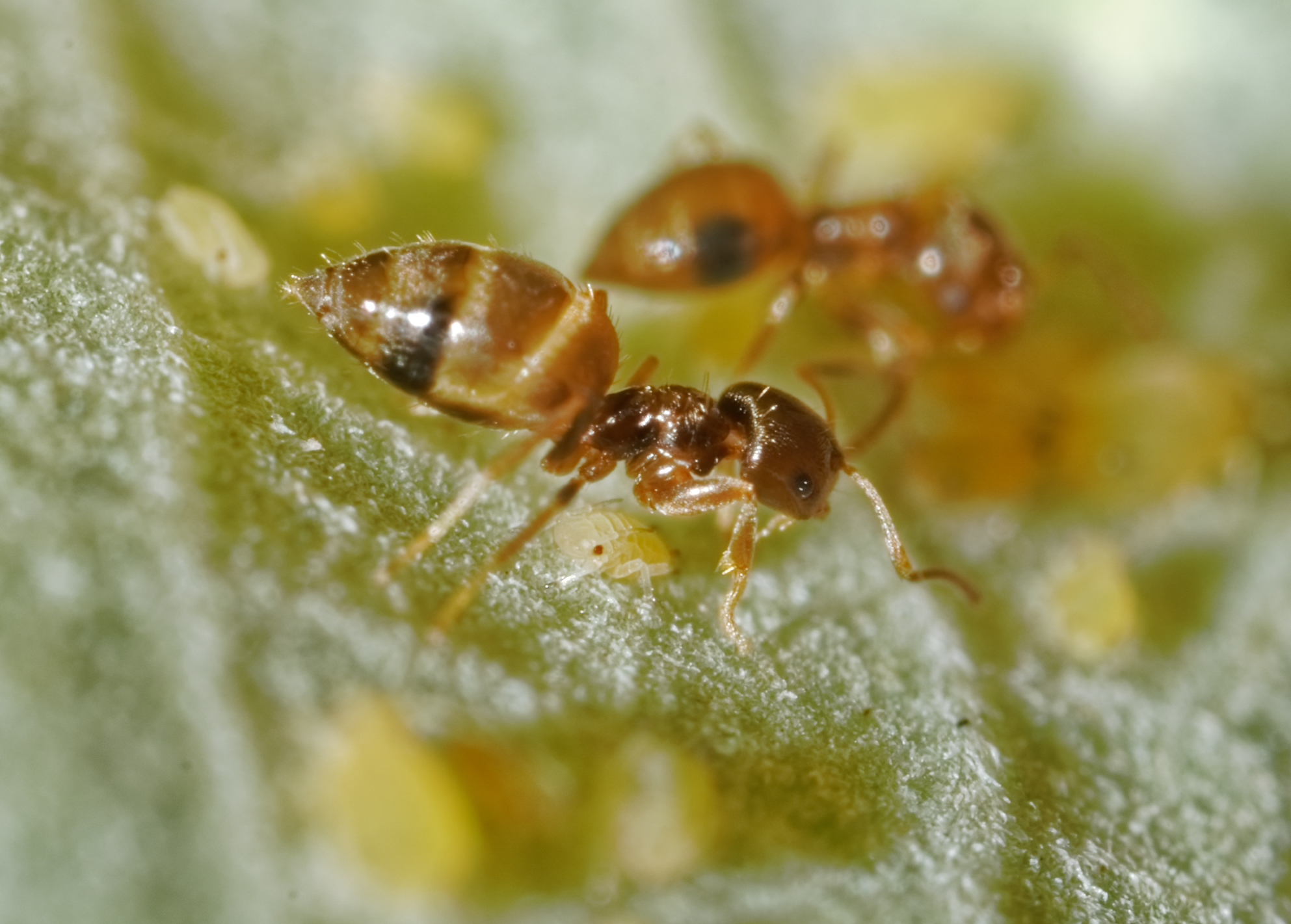
Brachymyrmex obscurior ant farming aphids
