= Pterygodermatites peromysci =

Scientific classification
- Kingdom: Animalia
- Phylum: Nematoda
- Class: Chromadorea
- Order: Rhabditida
- Family: Rictulariidae
- Genus: Pterygodermatites
- Species: P. peromysci

Binomial name
- Pterygodermatites peromysci Lichtenfels, 1970

Species of roundworm

Pterygodermatites peromysci is an intestinal parasitic nematode in the genus Pterygodermatites of the family Rictulariidae.

== Hosts ==
Scanning electron microscopy (SEM) studies of Pterygodermatites peromysci have not been conducted yet, but might provide scientists with an understanding about how it causes pathology in the gastrointestinal tract of the host, as worms have been found in vitro as large as 38 mm in a host mouse with a body length size of 90 mm. In a case where 8 of these adult worms were discovered in a mouse, it was noted that the mouse had a very inflamed and damaged gut from the internal damage of pressure on host tissues (1). However, scanning electron microscopy studies have been conducted on Pterygodermatites bovieri in which the definitive host is bats (2) and on Pterygodermatites mesopectines which has been noted to parasitize a commensal rodent, Mastomys natalensis (3) so a comparison SEM study of the morphology of the head of P. peromysci with previously SEM studied species may present interesting results since SEM studies of the Pterygodermatites species which infects a rodent (Mastomys natalensis) has already been worked out.

== Life cycle ==
Though a scanning electron microscopy study of P. peromysci hasn’t been worked out, there do exist stereo microscope images of the morphology of the egg with a hatching third stage infectious juvenile which infect white-footed mice, Peromyscus leucopus, (Figure 2, source 4). Parasitic infection of the definitive mouse occurs once the encysted egg in the haemocoel of the intermediate host, a camel cricket, is ingested via mouse-based predation of the intermediate host. To complete this life cycle characteristic of nematodes in the family Rictulariidae, P. peromysci larvae migrate into the gastrointestinal tract, molting into a 4th stage juvenile and then into an adult. The life cycle is continued when the mouse sheds its embryonated eggs into the environment (Figure 1, source 4). What is notable about this life-cycle is that the eggs are embryonated, rather than non-embryonated, when they are passed into the environment. Since the intermediate host is most abundant during the months of August – September, the prevalence of infection in these mice is greatest during the end of the summer months. Furthermore, the eggs are able to survive the winter, hatch in the spring, and then continue the infection cycle with the camel crickets (4). However though P. peromysci has been more commonly observed in white-footed mice (Peromyscus leucopus), it has also been reported identified using flying squirrels as its definitive host such as the northern flying squirrel (Glaucomys sabrinus) and the southern flying squirrel (Glaucomys volans) which illustrates that there is more than one possible definitive host for P. peromysci (5).

== Distribution ==
Pterygodermatites peromysci has been discovered in Florida and in Pennsylvania primarily in white-footed mice (Peromyscus leucopus). Geographically the infected mice have been shown to be abundant in flatwood habitats of Florida, characterized by poorly draining soils which may have standing water during rainy seasons. Here, the vegetation is usually rather diverse. In other places infected mice have been identified in the hardwood forests of Pennsylvania (3, 6). Further complicating the life-cycle, but still with regard to geographical distribution, P. peromysci adults have been identified in New York as well as in Pennsylvania in flying squirrel populations. In the flying squirrel hosts, another parasite, Strongyloides robustus was also identified. The scientists hypothesized that perhaps initial infection with S. robustus via skin penetration of the flying squirrel host might alter the immune response of the host in such a way that encourages co-infection of the gastrointestinal tract with P. peromysci (5). Furthermore, in the flying squirrels, the pathology was not deemed severe from spleen masses collected from the squirrels as the spleens were not appreciably enlarged from pathology. Perhaps the reduced pathology in this case is due to parasitic competition between S. robustus and P. peromysci as S. robustus takes most of the chemical resources from P. peromysci as S. robustus was most abundant in all the specimens co-infected with the two parasites.

=== Zoonosis? ===
Perhaps since the life-cycle of P. peromysci in its definitive host involves predation of crickets, parasitism in humans is not a predominant problem in countries such as the United States where consumption of insects is not a common-practice (4). This may explain why the Center for Disease Control (CDC) has not published any online reports on human infection by P. peromysci. While this may not prove that it definitely has never infected humans, it may explain the current absence of observed zoonosis findings or the need for human treatment.

=== Treatment of infected mice ===
In a field study to determine if there was sex-biased infection towards male mice, female and male mice were separated into groups and administered an antihelminthic drug to clear the infection of P. peromysci adults in infected rodents to test if males or females released more infectious eggs ingested by cricket intermediate hosts. The antihelminthic drug was levamisole hydrochloride which when tested in the infected mice was shown to be able to control and prevent infection of P. peromysci in both the male and female mice for up to 2 weeks optimally, but no longer than 4 weeks for the dose given (7). Probably after 2 weeks of the treatment dose (36 mg / kg) the free mice were susceptible to reinfection.

== Sources ==
1) Vandegrift, K. J., & Hudson, P. J. (2009). Could parasites destabilize mouse populations? The potential role of Pterygodermatites peromysci in the population dynamics of free-living mice, Peromyscus leucopus. International journal for parasitology, 39(11), 1253–1262.

2) Tkach, V. V., & Swiderski, Z. P. (1995). Scanning electron microscopy of the rare nematode species Pterygodermatites bovieri (Nematoda: Rictatuliriidae), a parasite of bats. Folia parasitologica, 43(4), 301–304.

3) Diouf, M., Diagne, C. A., Quilichini, Y., Dobigny, G., Garba, M., & Marchand, B. (2013). Pterygodermatites (Mesopectines) niameyensis n. sp.(Nematoda: Rictulariidae), a Parasite of Mastomys natalensis (Smith, 1834)(Rodentia: Muridae) from Niger. The Journal of parasitology, 99(6), 1034–1039.

4) Luong, L. T., & Hudson, P. J. (2012). Complex life cycle of Pterygodermatites peromysci, a trophically transmitted parasite of the white-footed mouse (Peromyscus leucopus). Parasitology research, 110(1), 483–487.

5) Krichbaum, K., Mahan, C. G., Steele, M. A., Turner, G., & Hudson, P. J. (2010). The potential role of Strongyloides robustus on parasite-mediated competition between two species of flying squirrels (Glaucomys). Journal of Wildlife Diseases, 46(1), 229–235.

6) Kinsella, J. M. (1991). Comparison of helminths of three species of mice, Podomys floridanus, Peromyscus gossypinus, and Peromyscus polionotus, from southern Florida. Canadian journal of zoology, 69(12), 3078–3083.

7) Luong, L. T., Grear, D. A., & Hudson, P. J. (2009). Male hosts are responsible for the transmission of a trophically transmitted parasite, Pterygodermatites peromysci, to the intermediate host in the absence of sex-biased infection.International journal for parasitology, 39(11), 1263–1268.
