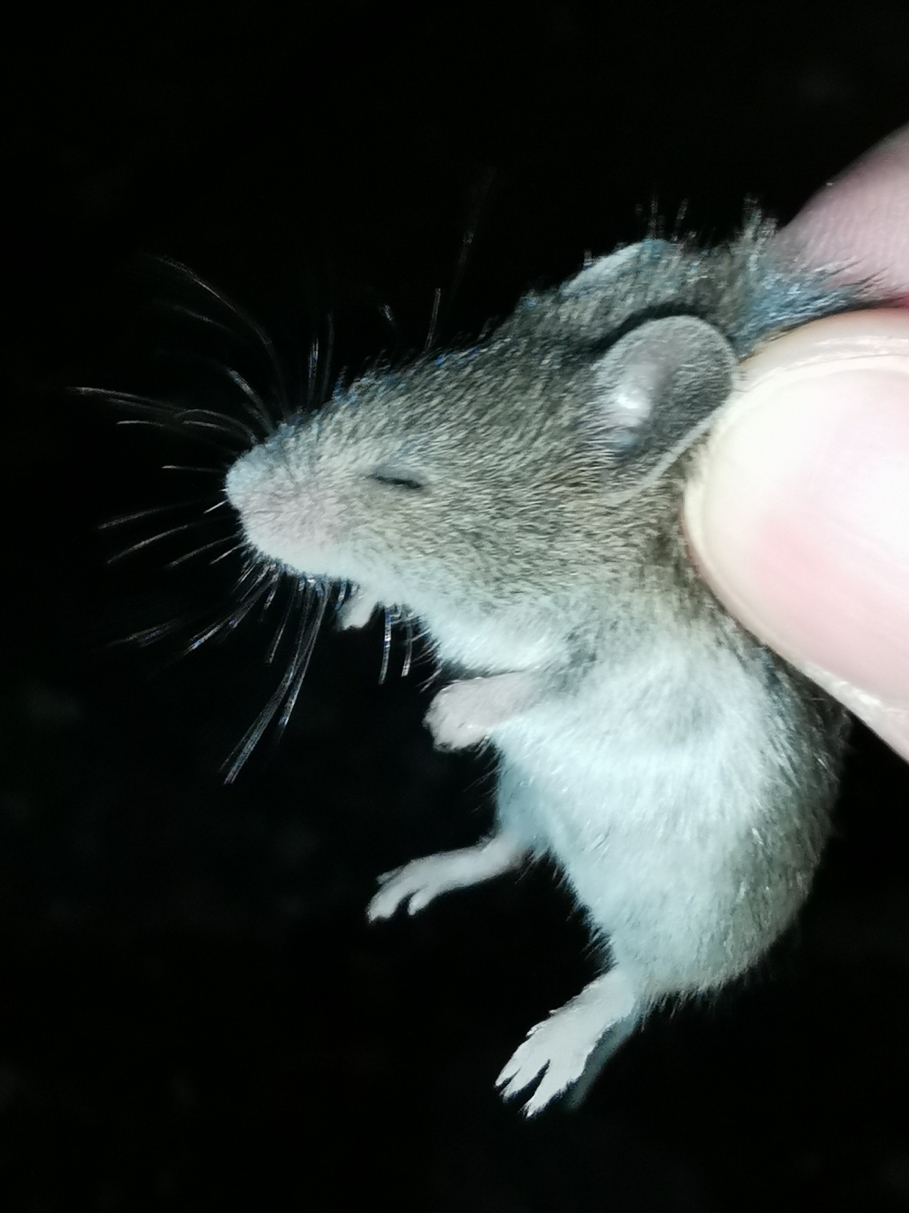

Conservation status
- Least Concern (IUCN 3.1)

Scientific classification
- Kingdom: Animalia
- Phylum: Chordata
- Class: Mammalia
- Order: Rodentia
- Family: Cricetidae
- Subfamily: Neotominae
- Genus: Baiomys
- Species: B. brunneus

Binomial name
- Baiomys brunneus (J. A. Allen & F. M. Chapman, 1897)

Synonyms
- Peromyscus musculus brunneus J. A. Allen & F. M. Chapman, 1897

= Southern pygmy mouse =

Species of rodent

The southern pygmy mouse (Baiomys brunneus) is a species of rodent in the family Cricetidae. It is found in El Salvador, Guatemala, Honduras, Mexico, and Nicaragua.

== Taxonomy ==
This species was originally described as a subspecies of the Mexican pygmy mouse (B. musculus). It was considered a subspecies of B. musculus until 2021, when it was determined that most populations formerly considered part of B. musculus should instead belong to B. brunneus. The Trans-Mexican Volcanic Belt and the Balsas River, form a barrier between B. musculus to the west and B. brunneus to the east. This species, as well as B. musculus, are likely more basal within Baiomys than the northern pygmy mouse, since they moreso resemble fossil species.

There are seven recognized subspecies:

- B. b. brunneus J. A. Allen & F. M. Chapman, 1897 - native to central Veracruz, eastern Puebla, and a small part of northernmost Oaxaca
- B. b. grisescens E. A. Goldman, 1932 - native to southern Guatemala, northern El Salvador, and southwestern Honduras
- B. b. handleyi Packard, 1958 - only known from Sacapulas in central Guatemala
- B. b. infernatis Hooper, 1952 - only known from southern Puebla and northwestern Oaxaca
- B. b. nigrescens Osgood, 1904 - native to southern Honduras, most of El Salvador, southern Guatemala, and most of the Mexican state of Chiapas
- B. b. pallidus Russell, 1952 - native to southern and western Oaxaca, most of Guerrero, southern Estado de Mexico, Morelos, southern Mexico City and southwestern Puebla
- B. b. pullus Packard, 1958 - native to southernmost Honduras and northwestern Nicaragua

== Description ==
The outer coat of the southern pygmy mouse varies from a reddish brown to almost black. The under belly is lighter in tone than the back ranging from pinkish buff to white. Juveniles are born with a gray coat that slowly turns brown as they mature. Uncharacteristically of other members in the family Cricetidae, they have 14 cheek teeth instead of 12.

== Habitat ==
Coastal animals are larger on average. They occupy a wide range of habitats, primarily in weedy fields and agricultural land. In hot, dry, sandy areas, they have been observed taking advantage of fields with cacti that dissuade cattle from grazing in those areas. They are also found in rocky grasslands. They have also been recorded from sugar plantations, streamside grasslands, palm groves, and mixed-growth forests.

== Ecology ==
In areas where their range interacts with B. taylori, B. brunneus prefer lowlands while B. taylori prefers highlands, but this species is less common where these areas meet. They are primarily diurnal and crepuscular, active in the afternoon and early evening. These species feed on nuts, bark, grass, and leaves, and have been reported feeding on banana in traps. They have been found in owl pellets, and are likely also preyed on by small mammals and other birds of prey.

== Reproduction ==
Breeding occurs year-round but rates are not constant throughout the year. During the winter and spring there are fewer litters born. Individuals living in grassy areas dig burrows for nesting while others in rocky areas live under rocks. Breeding seems to occur year-round, but they are less likely to reproduce in winter and early spring. Litter size is 1–4, averaging near 3.
