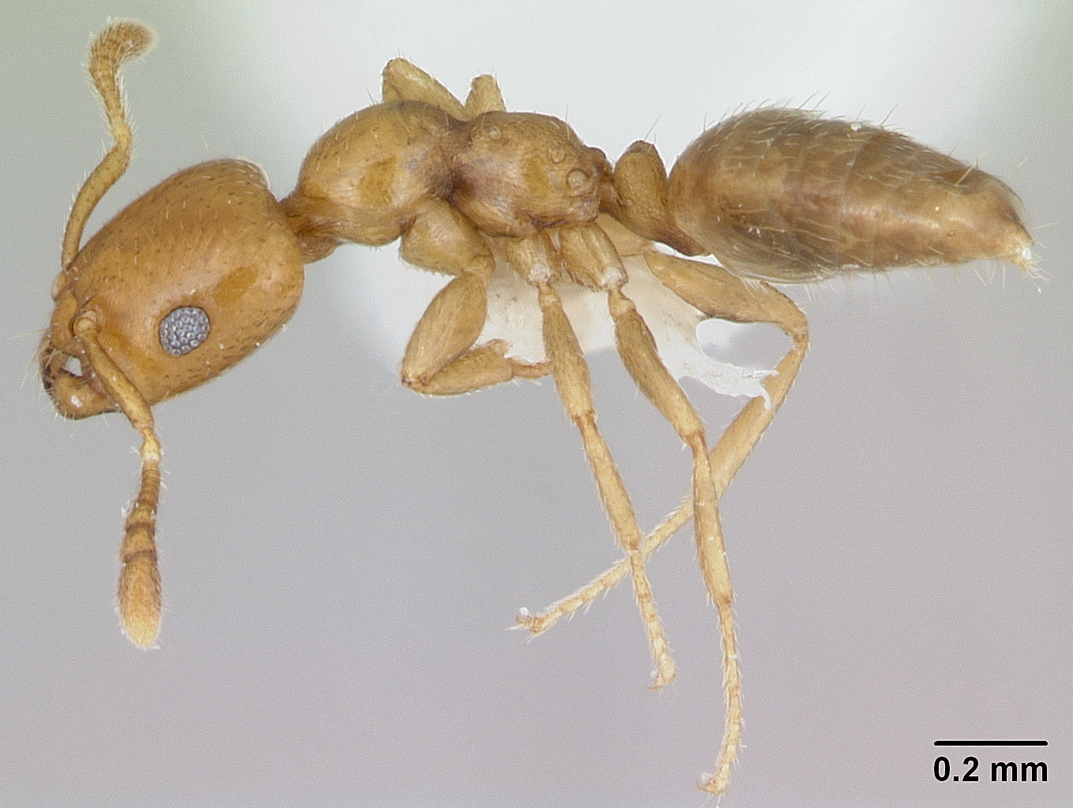
- Myrmelachista nodigera worker

Scientific classification
- Domain: Eukaryota
- Kingdom: Animalia
- Phylum: Arthropoda
- Class: Insecta
- Order: Hymenoptera
- Family: Formicidae
- Subfamily: Formicinae
- Tribe: Myrmelachistini
- Genus: Myrmelachista; Roger, 1863

Type species
- Myrmelachista kraatzii Roger, 1863

Diversity
- 56 species

Synonyms
- Decamera Roger, 1863; Hincksidris Donisthorpe, 1944; Neaphomus Menozzi, 1935

= Myrmelachista =

Genus of ants

Myrmelachista is a Neotropical genus of ants in the subfamily Formicinae. The genus is found exclusively in the Neotropical realm. Little is known regarding their biology.

== Habitat and distribution ==
The genus is restricted to the Neotropical region, and 41% of the species in this genus can be found in Brazil. The species in this genus are arboreal and engage in the specialized practice of nesting in trunk cavities and among twigs. These ant species may also form complex mutual associations with certain myrmecophytes or with Coccidae and Pseudococcidae species. Little information is available regarding the biology of Myrmelachista species; however, it is known that these species generally feed on extrafloral nectaries and on animal-derived proteins.

== Description ==
Myrmelachista species possess between nine and 10 antennal segments. Most nine-segmented Myrmelachista species are found in Central America and the Caribbean (with only two known nine-segmented Myrmelachista species in South America), whereas 10-segmented Myrmelachista species are mostly found in South America (with only three known 10-segmented Myrmelachista species found in Mexico and Central America). The larvae of Myrmelachista ants are elongate and unremarkable, excepting for a few protruding dorsal hairs which might have a biological function in hanging larvae inside their nests.

The circumscription of Myrmelachista species is a complex task because the morphological differences between individuals of a single species that originate from different colonies can be sufficient to cause these individuals to be erroneously regarded as members of different species.

== Species ==
As of 2014, 58 Myrmelachista species have been described, with a few recognized subspecies; the diversity of this genus has most likely been underestimated due to the limited taxonomic knowledge available regarding Myrmelachista. In the most recent molecular databased phylogenetic proposals for ants, Myrmelachista is a sister group of Brachymyrmex, and these groups constitute the most basal and closely related formicine groups.

- Myrmelachista ambigua Forel, 1893
- Myrmelachista amicta Wheeler, 1934
- Myrmelachista arborea Forel, 1909
- Myrmelachista arthuri Forel, 1903
- Myrmelachista bambusarum Forel, 1903
- Myrmelachista bettinae Forel, 1903
- Myrmelachista brevicornis Wheeler, 1934
- Myrmelachista bruchi Santschi, 1922
- Myrmelachista catharinae Mayr, 1887
- Myrmelachista chilensis Forel, 1904
- Myrmelachista cooperi (Gregg, 1951)
- Myrmelachista dalmasi Forel, 1912
- Myrmelachista donisthorpei Wheeler, 1934
- Myrmelachista elata Santschi, 1922
- Myrmelachista elongata Santschi, 1925
- Myrmelachista flavida Wheeler, 1934
- Myrmelachista flavocotea Longino, 2006
- Myrmelachista flavoguarea Longino, 2006
- Myrmelachista gagates Wheeler, 1936
- Myrmelachista gagatina Emery, 1894
- Myrmelachista gallicola Mayr, 1887
- Myrmelachista goeldii Forel, 1903
- Myrmelachista goetschi (Menozzi, 1935)
- Myrmelachista guyanensis Wheeler, 1934
- Myrmelachista haberi Longino, 2006
- Myrmelachista hoffmanni Forel, 1903
- Myrmelachista joycei Longino, 2006
- Myrmelachista kloetersi Forel, 1903
- Myrmelachista kraatzii Roger, 1863
- Myrmelachista lauroatlantica Longino, 2006
- Myrmelachista lauropacifica Longino, 2006
- Myrmelachista longiceps Longino, 2006
- Myrmelachista longinoda Forel, 1899
- Myrmelachista mayri Forel, 1886
- Myrmelachista meganaranja Longino, 2006
- Myrmelachista mexicana Wheeler, 1934
- Myrmelachista muelleri Forel, 1903
- Myrmelachista nigella (Roger, 1863)
- Myrmelachista nigrocotea Longino, 2006
- Myrmelachista nodigera Mayr, 1887
- Myrmelachista osa Longino, 2006
- Myrmelachista paderewskii Forel, 1908
- Myrmelachista plebecula Menozzi, 1927
- Myrmelachista ramulorum Wheeler, 1908
- Myrmelachista reclusi Forel, 1903
- Myrmelachista reichenspergeri Santschi, 1922
- Myrmelachista reticulata Borgmeier, 1928
- Myrmelachista rogeri André, 1887
- Myrmelachista rudolphi Forel, 1903
- Myrmelachista ruszkii Forel, 1903
- Myrmelachista schachovskoi Kusnezov, 1951
- Myrmelachista schumanni Emery, 1890
- Myrmelachista skwarrae Wheeler, 1934
- Myrmelachista ulei Forel, 1904
- Myrmelachista vicina Kusnezov, 1951
- Myrmelachista zeledoni Emery, 1896
