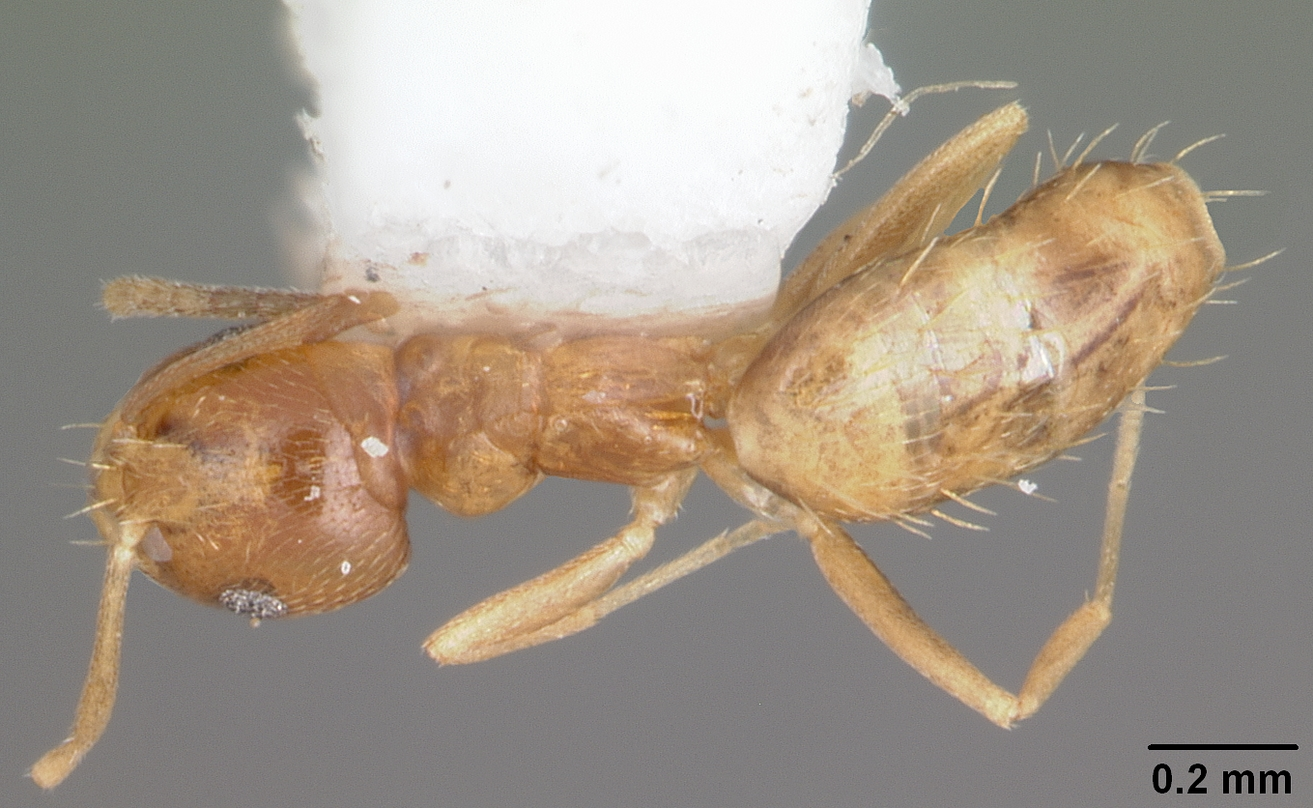

Scientific classification
- Kingdom: Animalia
- Phylum: Arthropoda
- Class: Insecta
- Order: Hymenoptera
- Family: Formicidae
- Subfamily: Formicinae
- Tribe: Myrmelachistini
- Genus: Brachymyrmex
- Species: B. minutus

Binomial name
- Brachymyrmex minutus Forel, 1893

= Brachymyrmex minutus =

Species of ant

Brachymyrmex minutus is a species of ant in the family Formicidae.
