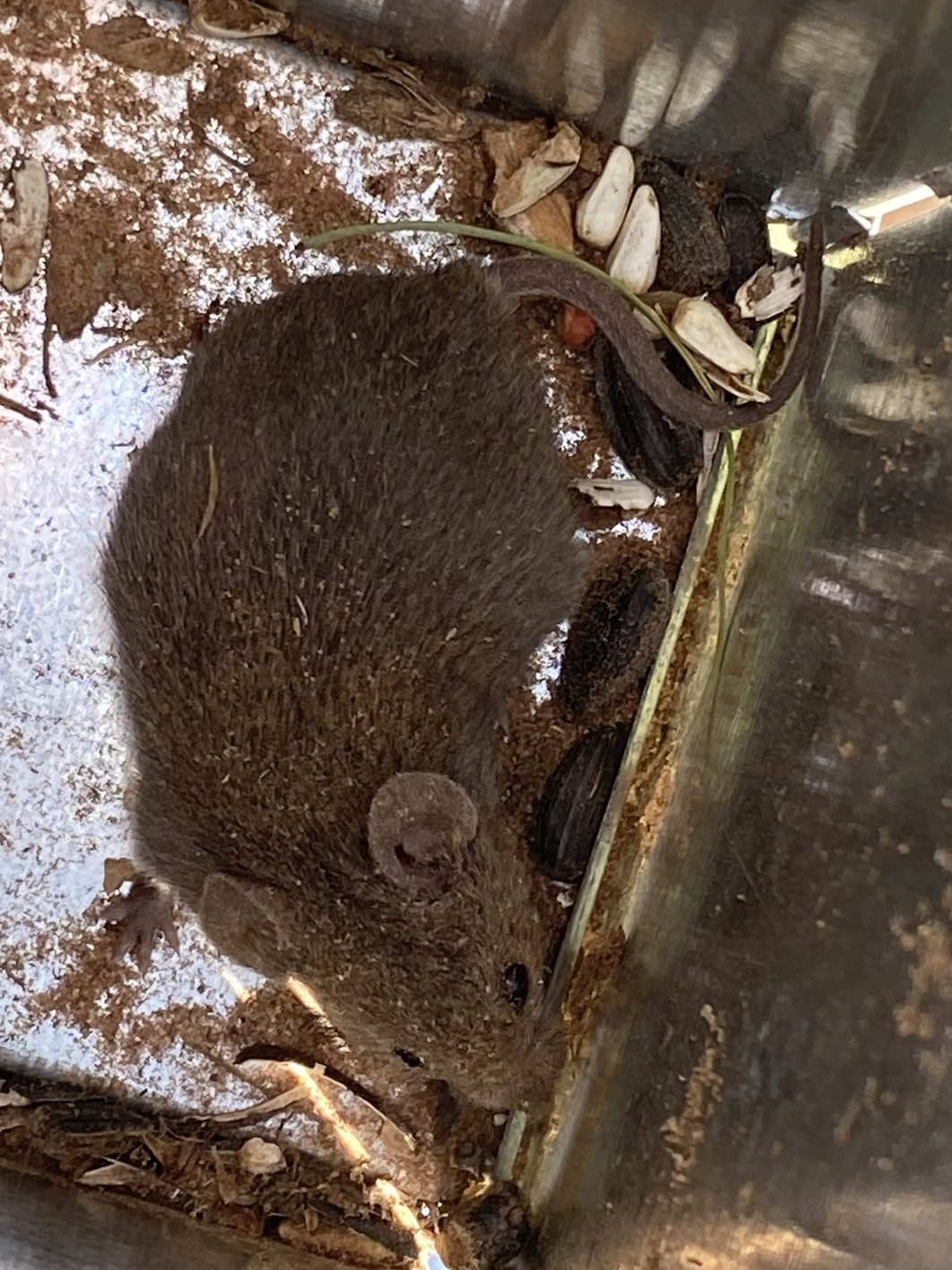
- Baiomys taylori

Scientific classification
- Kingdom: Animalia
- Phylum: Chordata
- Class: Mammalia
- Order: Rodentia
- Family: Cricetidae
- Subfamily: Neotominae
- Tribe: Baiomyini
- Genus: Baiomys; True, 1894

Type species
- Hesperomys taylori Thomas, 1887

Species
- Baiomys brunneus (J. A. Allen & F. M. Chapman, 1897); Baiomys musculus (Merriam, 1892); Baiomys taylori (O. Thomas, 1887)

= Baiomys =

Baiomys Temporal range: Early Pliocene to Recent

Genus of rodents

Baiomys, the New World pygmy mice, is a genus of rodents in the family Cricetidae. Together with Scotinomys, it forms the tribe Baiomyini. It contains the smallest rodents in North America. It currently contains three extant species:

- Southern pygmy mouse, Baiomys brunneus
- Mexican pygmy mouse, Baiomys musculus
- Northern pygmy mouse, Baiomys taylori

Additionally, there are seven known fossil species:

- Baiomys aquilonius Zakrzewski, 1969
- Baiomys brachygnathus (Gidley, 1922)
- Baiomys intermedius Packard & T. Alvarez, 1965
- Baiomys kolbi Hibbard, 1952
- Baiomys minimus (Gidley, 1922)
- Baiomys rexroadi Hibbard, 1941
- Baiomys sawrockensis Hibbard, 1953
