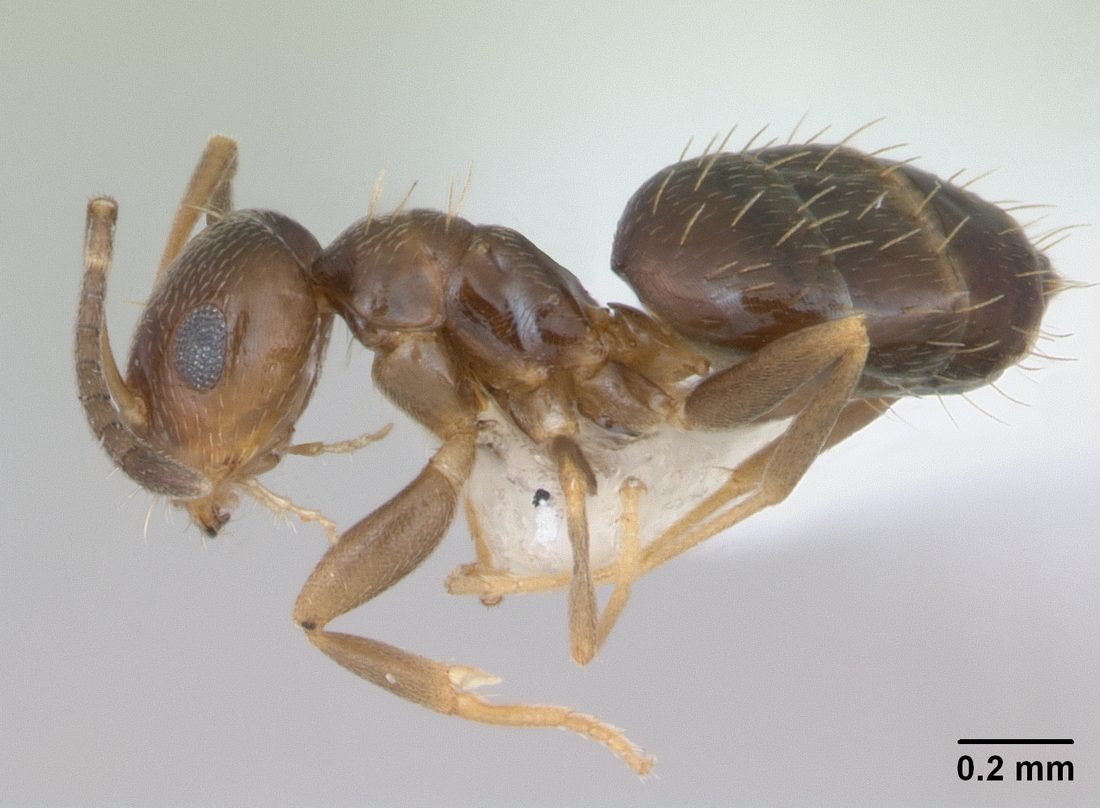

Scientific classification
- Kingdom: Animalia
- Phylum: Arthropoda
- Clade: Pancrustacea
- Class: Insecta
- Order: Hymenoptera
- Family: Formicidae
- Subfamily: Formicinae
- Tribe: Myrmelachistini
- Genus: Brachymyrmex
- Species: B. patagonicus

Binomial name
- Brachymyrmex patagonicus Mayr, 1868

= Brachymyrmex patagonicus =

Species of ant

Brachymyrmex patagonicus, also known as the black rover ant, is a species of Formicine ant native to Mexico, Central America, South America, and invasive in the United States and Europe. They were first reported in St. Tammany Parish, Louisiana in 1978 from a single colony collected in 1976. It is believed that the species was introduced through New Orleans, which is a common entry point for many tropical species, but other locations such as Mobile, Alabama, or Pensacola, Florida, are also likely. For many years B. patagonicus, B. musculus, and B. obscurior were misidentified as being separate species but after a comparison of specimens from the Louisiana State University Arthropod Collection (LSUC), it was found that all three were the same species. B. patagonicus is considered a nuisance pest due to their tendency to infest man-made structures but have received a lack of attention because they do not bite, sting, or carry disease.

== Identification ==
Dark rover ants are small brown ants that are typically less than 2.5 millimeters in length. Worker ants in this species range from 1.0mm to 2.0mm, whereas queens are around 3.0mm. Males are around 1.0mm in length. The antennae of the worker ants contain nine segments which is common among all species of Brachymyrmex. B. patagonicus have long hairs along the mesosoma and relatively large eyes compared to the other species in the Brachymyrmex genus. On the dorsal surface of the gaster, the distribution of appressed hairs is sparse.

== Subspecies ==
These three subspecies belong to the species Brachymyrmex patagonicus:

- Brachymyrmex patagonicus atratulus Santschi, 1923^{i c g}
- Brachymyrmex patagonicus cordemoyi^{g}
- Brachymyrmex patagonicus patagonicus Mayr, 1868^{i c g}

Data sources: i = ITIS, c = Catalogue of Life, g = GBIF, b = Bugguide.net

== Diet ==
Few studies have been conducted on the diet of B. patagonicus but it has been observed in nature that this species visits extrafloral nectaries for nectar. Another theory suggests that a major part of their diet is honeydew from hemipterans. In Laboratory settings, an artificial diet containing 30% honey solution, liquid tuna mixture, and caterpillar pieces was observed to support B. patagonicus.

== Breeding System and Colony Structure ==
Most invasive ant species display polygyne tendencies, dispersal by budding, and development of supercolonies that contain hundreds of reproductive queens each. The colony structure of Brachymyrmex patagonicus differs from most invasive ant species in that they are multicolonial and monodomous. This means that each colony consists of a single nest that is genetically different from others around it. In 80% of nests, a single queen heads the colony. In the remaining 20%, there is no queen present. In about 50% of nests headed by a single queen, the queen is only mated by one male.

== Dispersal and Habitat ==
B. patagonicus is native to South America, and more specifically Argentina and Paraguay. It has been introduced in multiple parts of the world including the United States, Asia, and parts of Europe. In less than 50 years after the introduction of the species into the United States, members of B. patagonicus are now commonly found in 14 states ranging from North Carolina to California.

B. patagonicus commonly form their colonies in the soil, at bases of trees, in leaf litter, piles of wood, and trash piles. In southern areas of the United States, colonies are found in both natural and disturbed areas but are more prevalent in areas near human activity. In landscaped areas, they are commonly found in mulch and man made structures. Laboratory studies have shown that B. patagonicus have a preference for moist environments

== Interaction with other species ==
B. patagonicus are found to coexist with many native and introduced species including those typically intolerant to other ant species such as Solenopsis invicta and Solenopsis xyloni. It is hypothesized that B. patagonicus may play an important role in the regulation of the populations of the invasive cactus moth (Cactoblastic cactorum). This theory is currently under investigation.
