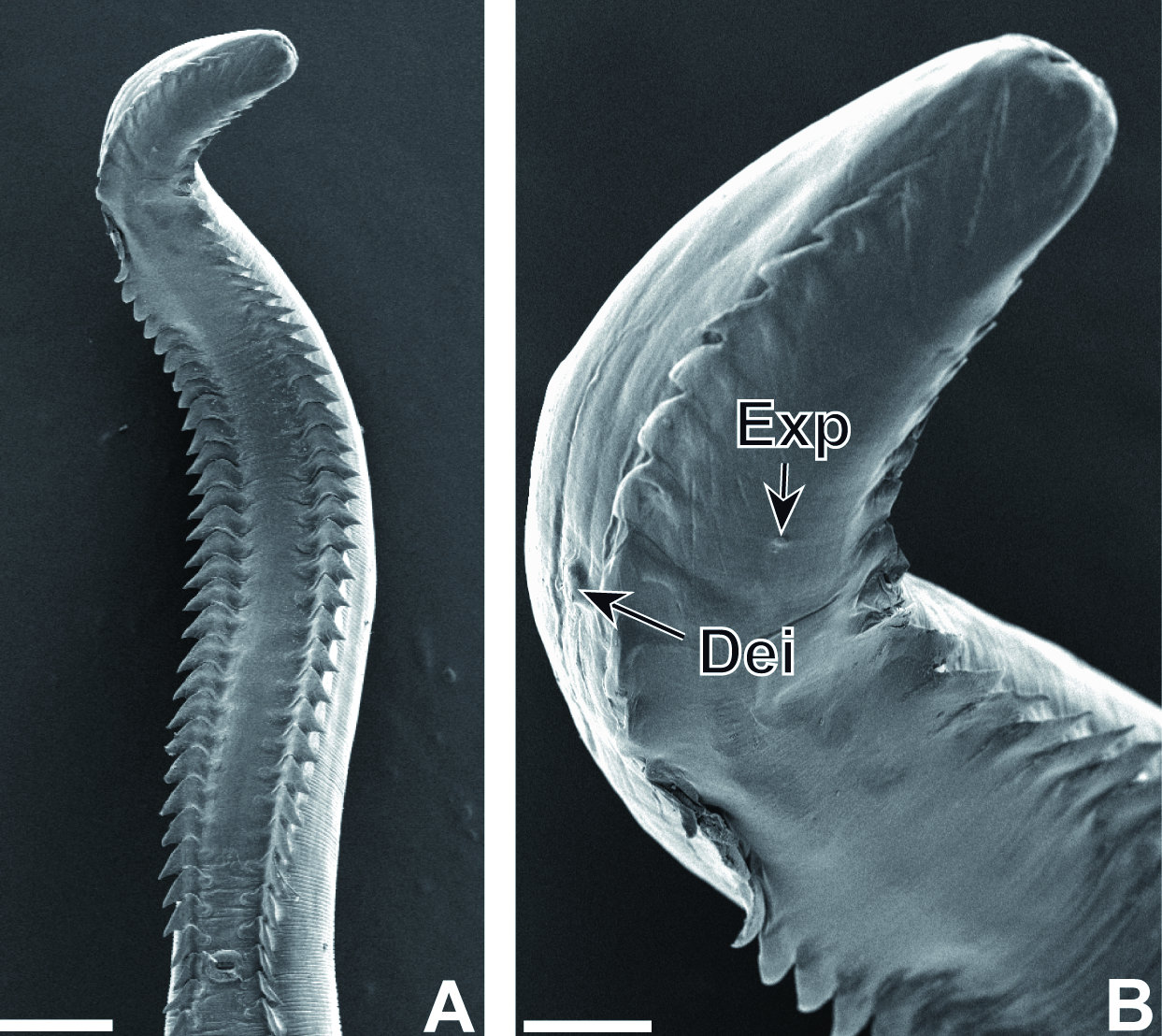
- Pterydodermatites quentini

Scientific classification
- Kingdom: Animalia
- Phylum: Nematoda
- Class: Chromadorea
- Order: Rhabditida
- Family: Rictulariidae
- Genus: Pterygodermatites; Wedl, 1861

Species
- See text

= Pterygodermatites =

Genus of roundworms

Pterygodermatites is a genus of parasitic nematodes in the family Rictulariidae. Their life-cycle is complex. Species include:

- Pterygodermatites baiomydis Lynggaard, García-Prieto, Guzmán-Cornejo & Osorio-Sarabia, 2014
- Pterygodermatites jagerskiöldi
- Pterygodermatites kozeki
- Pterygodermatites mexicana Caspeta-Mandujano et al., 2013
- Pterygodermatites nycticebi (Mönnig, 1920)
- Pterygodermatites ondatrae
- Pterygodermatites peromysci
- Pterydodermatites quentini Diouf et al., 2013
- Pterygodermatites valladaresi Miquel, Martín-Carrillo, Ribas, Sanchez-Vicente, Feliu & Foronda, 2022

Undescribed species have been recorded from the marsh rice rat in Florida and from Oryzomys gorgasi in Venezuela.

== See also ==
- List of parasites of the marsh rice rat

== Literature cited ==
- Braun, J.K.; Pratt, N.L.; Mares, M.A. (2010). "Thylamys pallidior (Didelphimorphia: Didelphidae)". Mammalian Species. 42 (856): 90–98. doi:10.1644/856.1.
- Kinsella, J.M. (1988). "Comparison of helminths of rice rats, Oryzomys palustris, from freshwater and saltwater marshes in Florida". Proceedings of the Helminthological Society of Washington. 55 (2): 275–280.
- Kinsella, J.M. (1991). "Comparison of helminths of three species of mice, Podomys floridanus, Peromyscus gossypinus, and Peromyscus polionotus, from southern Florida". Canadian Journal of Zoology. 69 (12): 3078–3083. Bibcode:1991CaJZ...69.3078K. doi:10.1139/z91-432.
- Pires, M.M.; Martins, E.G.; Silva, M.N.F.; dos Reid, S.F. (2010). "Gracilinanus microtarsus (Didelphimorphia: Didelphidae)". Mammalian Species. 42 (851): 33–40. doi:10.1644/851.1.
- Sánchez, H.; Ochoa, G.; Voss, R.S. (2001). "Rediscovery of Oryzomys gorgasi (Rodentia : Muridae). With Notes on Taxonomy and Natural History". Mammalia. 65 (2): 205–214. doi:10.1515/mamm.2001.65.2.205. S2CID 85316706.
