= Brachymyrmex musculus =

Scientific classification
- Kingdom: Animalia
- Phylum: Arthropoda
- Clade: Pancrustacea
- Class: Insecta
- Order: Hymenoptera
- Family: Formicidae
- Subfamily: Formicinae
- Genus: Brachymyrmex
- Species: B. musculus

Binomial name
- Brachymyrmex musculus Forel, 1899

Species of ant

Brachymyrmex musculus is a species of ant in the subfamily Formicinae.
