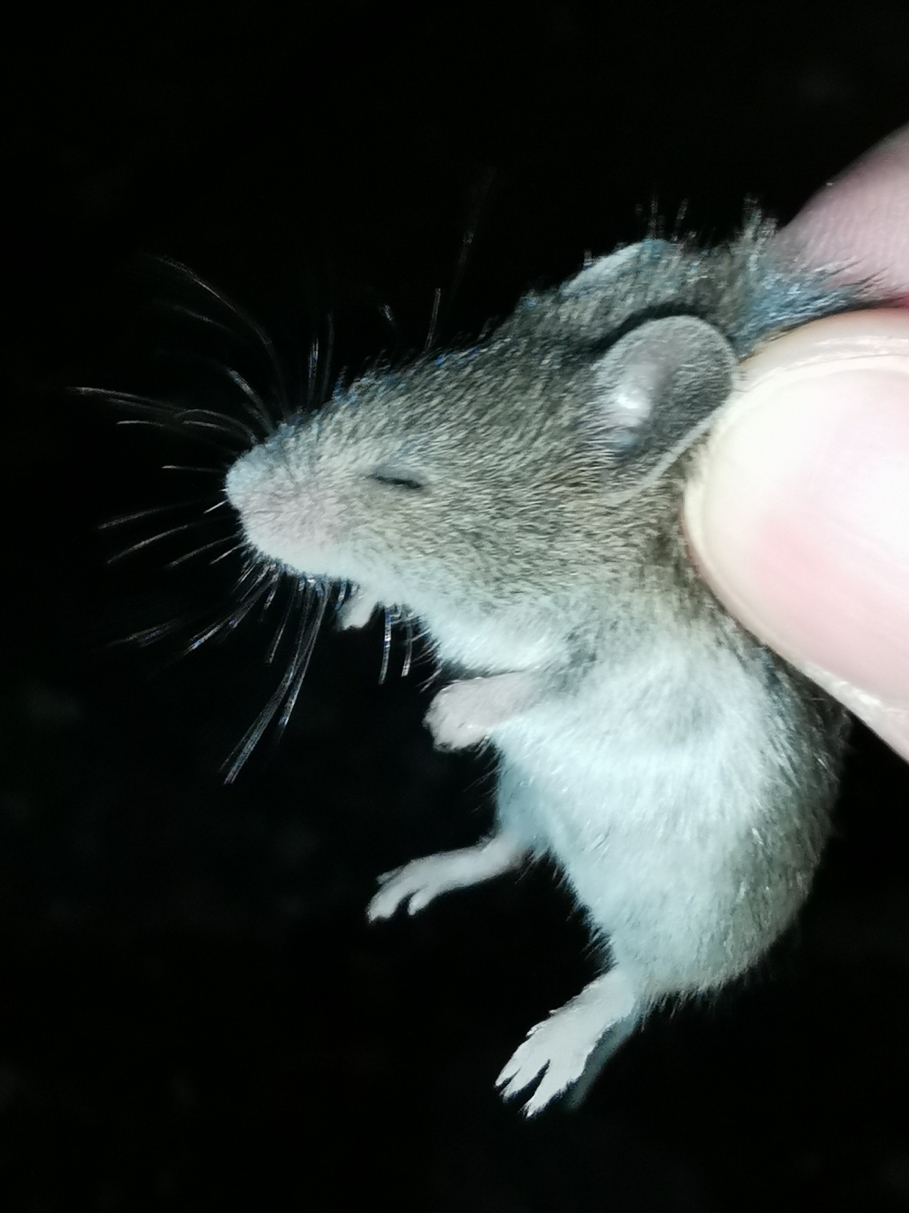

Conservation status
- Least Concern (IUCN 3.1)

Scientific classification
- Kingdom: Animalia
- Phylum: Chordata
- Class: Mammalia
- Order: Rodentia
- Family: Cricetidae
- Subfamily: Neotominae
- Genus: Baiomys
- Species: B. musculus

Binomial name
- Baiomys musculus (Merriam, 1892)

Synonyms
- Sitomys musculus Merriam, 1892

= Mexican pygmy mouse =

Species of rodent

The Mexican pygmy mouse (Baiomys musculus) is a species of rodent native to Mexico.

== Taxonomy ==
In 2021 it was determined that seven of the eight recognized subspecies formerly considered part of B. musculus should instead belong to B. brunneus. The Trans-Mexican Volcanic Belt and the Balsas River, form a barrier between B. musculus to the west and B. brunneus to the east. This species, as well as B. musculus, are likely more basal within Baiomys than the northern pygmy mouse, since they moreso resemble fossil species. This species has no accepted subspecies.

== Description ==
The hair of this species tends to be olive-brown to dark brown on top and lighter whitish to grayish on the bottom. The body length of this species is 75.6 mm (2.98 in), with a 47.5 mm (1.87 in) tail. It is larger on average than B. brunneus. Uncharacteristically of other members in the family Cricetidae, they have 14 cheek teeth instead of 12.

== Ecology ==
Similar to Baiomys brunneus, this species likely prefers to live in grasslands. They have been found in owl pellets, and are likely preyed upon by birds of prey and small mammals. They are active in the afternoon and early evening. They feed on nuts, leaves, seeds, and fruits.

== Range ==
This species is endemic to Mexico. It lives in the states of Michoacán, Colima, southern and central Jalisco, and southern Nayarit.
