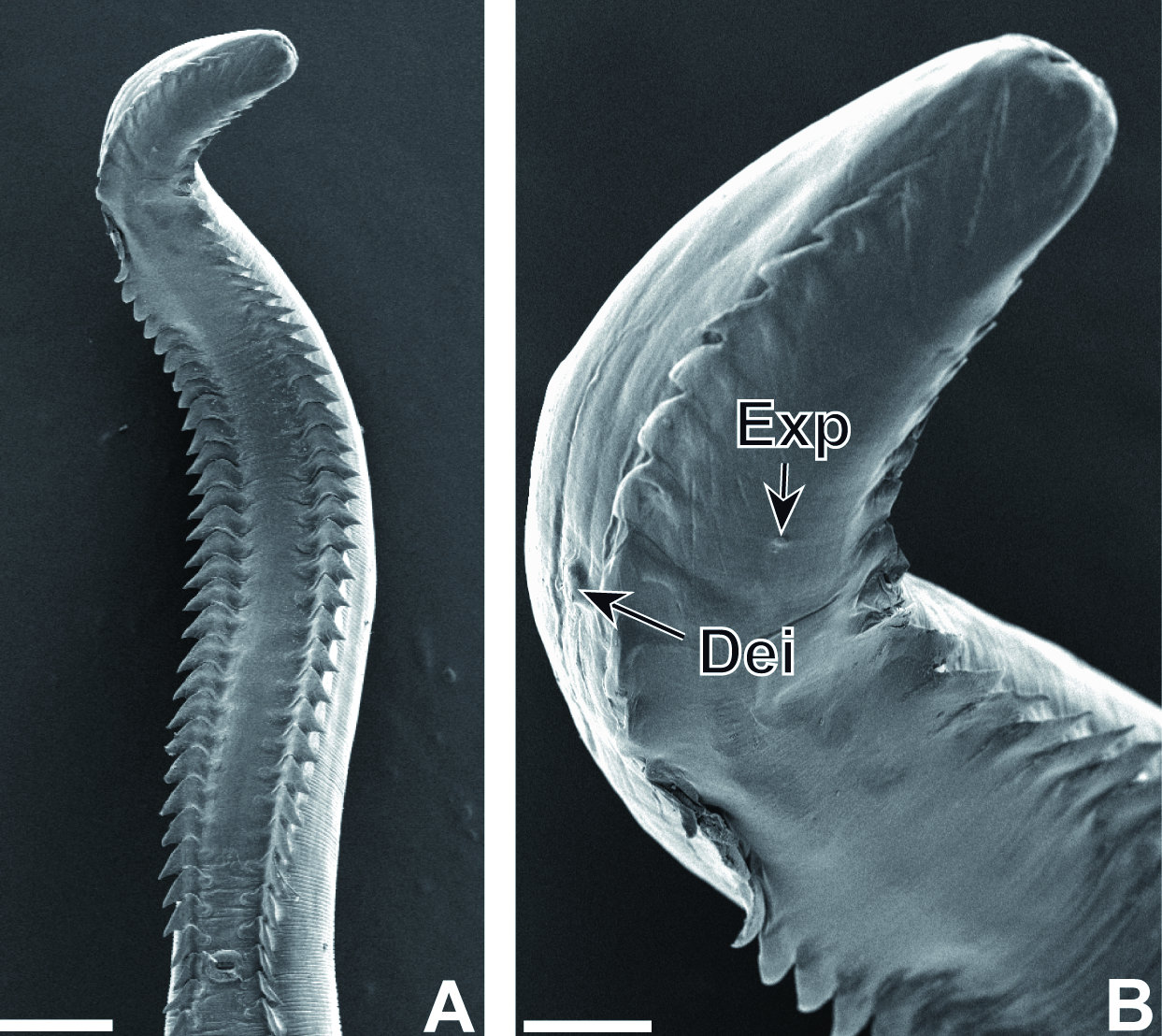
- Pterygodermatites (Mesopectines) quentini, Nematoda, Rictulariidae.

Scientific classification
- Domain: Eukaryota
- Kingdom: Animalia
- Phylum: Nematoda
- Class: Chromadorea
- Order: Rhabditida
- Family: Rictulariidae

= Rictulariidae =

Family of roundworms

Rictulariidae is a family of nematodes belonging to the order Rhabditida.

Genera:

- Pseudorictularia Dollfus & Desportes, 1945
- Pterygodermatites Wedl, 1861
- Rictularia Frölich, 1802
- Rictularina Johnston & Mawson, 1941
- Rictularioides Hall, 1916
