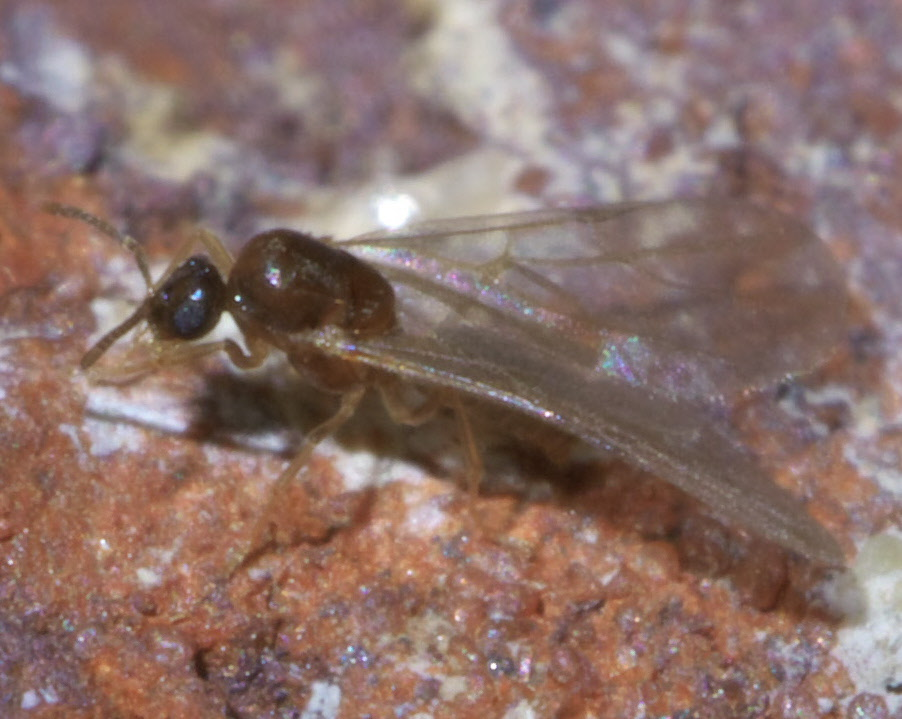
- Brachymyrmex depilis

Scientific classification
- Kingdom: Animalia
- Phylum: Arthropoda
- Clade: Pancrustacea
- Class: Insecta
- Order: Hymenoptera
- Family: Formicidae
- Subfamily: Formicinae
- Tribe: Myrmelachistini

= Myrmelachistini =

Tribe of ants

Myrmelachistini is a tribe of ants in the family of Formicidae. There are at least 2 genera and 50 described species in Myrmelachistini.

In 2016, the tribe Myrmelachistini was resurrected and the genera Brachymyrmex and Myrmelachista were transferred to it from the tribe Plagiolepidini.

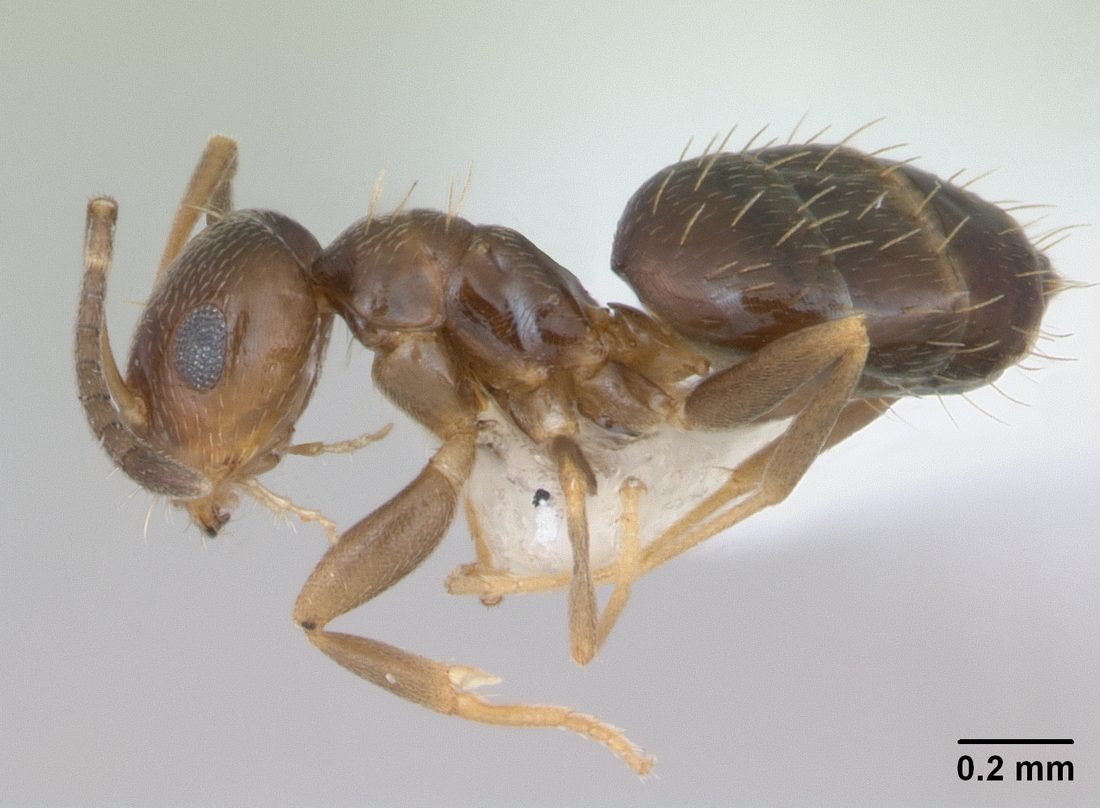
Brachymyrmex patagonicus

== Genera ==
- Brachymyrmex Mayr, 1868 (rover ants)
- Myrmelachista Roger, 1863
