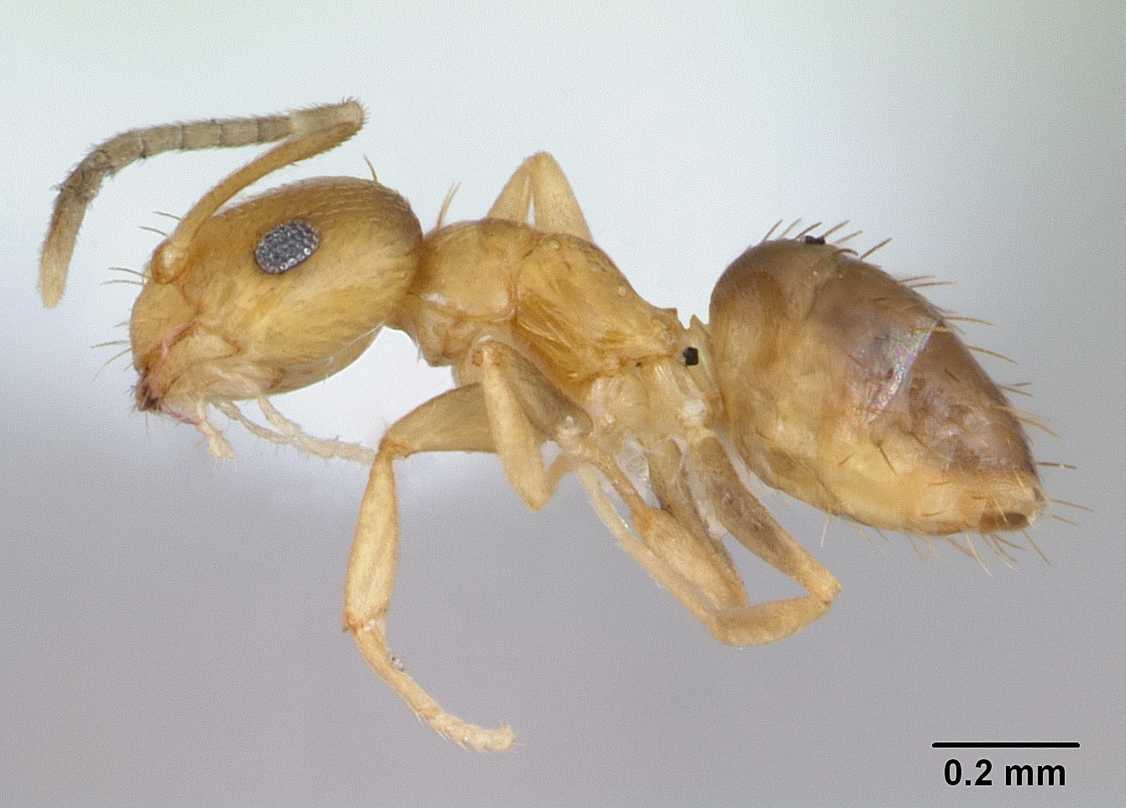
- Brachymyrmex aphidicola worker

Scientific classification
- Kingdom: Animalia
- Phylum: Arthropoda
- Clade: Pancrustacea
- Class: Insecta
- Order: Hymenoptera
- Family: Formicidae
- Subfamily: Formicinae
- Tribe: Myrmelachistini
- Genus: Brachymyrmex; Mayr, 1868

Type species
- Brachymyrmex patagonicus Mayr, 1868

Diversity
- 44 species

Synonyms
- Bryscha Santschi, 1923

= Brachymyrmex =

Genus of ants

Brachymyrmex is a genus in the ants subfamily Formicinae. The genus can be recognized by the combination of having nine antennal segments (fewer than most ants) and the petiole concealed by the gaster in dorsal view. They are sometimes called "rover ants".

== Distribution ==
The genus has a mainly Neotropical distribution, ranging from the United States to Argentina and Chile, including the Caribbean islands, but some species have been introduced to Japan, and Madagascar.

== Description ==
Brachymyrmex is a genus of minute ants that at first glance exhibit little morphological variation. Currently only the 9-segmented antennae and lack of antennal club have been proposed to diagnose workers of the genus. The combination of small size, soft metasoma, and the simple morphology makes observations and interpretation of morphological characters difficult. These difficulties impede taxonomic revisions and even led Creighton (1950) to call Brachymyrmex a "miserable little genus". Nevertheless, 44 species and 17 subspecies are currently assigned to Brachymyrmex.

== Taxonomy ==
The first complete taxonomic revision of Brachymyrmex was published by Santschi (1923) and included 27 species and 15 subspecies and varieties. In this revision, Santschi (1923) recognized two subgenera: 1) Brachymyrmex sensu stricto (including most of the species) and 2) Bryscha (four species).

Brachymyrmex sensu stricto contains species that have hairy legs, antennae without erect hairs and the second segment of the antennal funiculus much shorter that the first (= third antennal segment much shorter than the second). Bryscha species have legs and antennae with erect hairs and the second segment of the antennal funiculus is as long as or longer than the first. Unlike other species in the genus, two of the species of the subgenus Bryscha, Brachymyrmex pilipes and Brachymyrmex micromegas, have dimorphic workers. Ambiguity remains regarding the status of Bryscha. Brown (1973) provisionally synonymized it under Brachymyrmex and Bolton (1995, 2014) accepted this synonymy in his catalogues without substantiating the decision.

A study towards a revision of the genus was published in 2019 by Ortiz-Sepuvelda et al., taking morphological and molecular factors into account to reorganize many species and subspecies into new boundaries.

== See also ==
- List of Brachymyrmex species
