= List of ants of India =

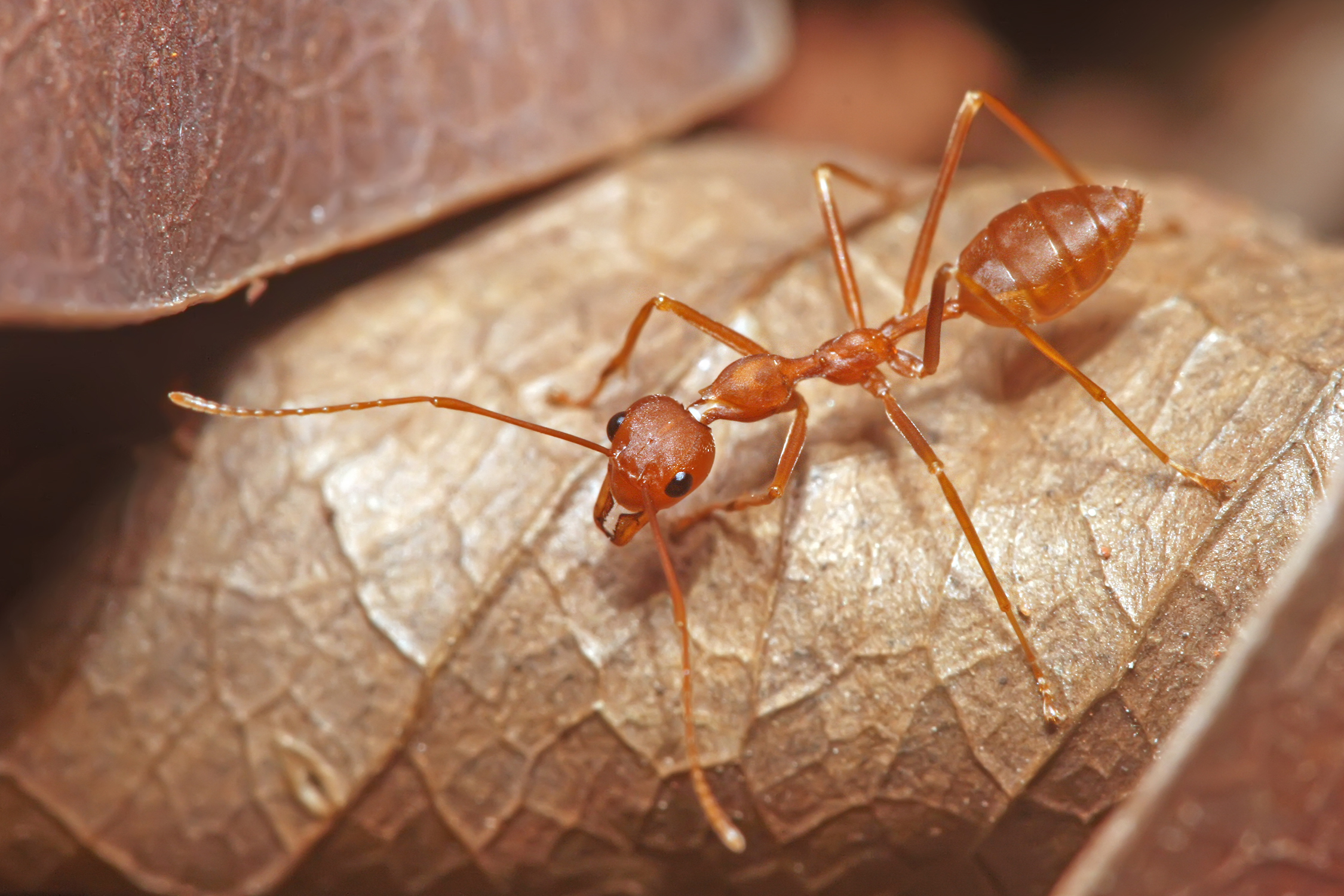
The Asian weaver ant, Oecophylla smaragdina, in Bengaluru, Karnataka.

This List of ants of India is a list and index to the species of ants found in India.

== A-D ==
- Acropyga acutiventris Roger, 1862
- Acropyga rubescens Forel, 1894
- Acropyga aranyani Shakur, 2025
- Aenictus aratus Forel, 1900
- Aenictus arya Forel, 1901
- Aenictus binghami Forel, 1900
- Aenictus brevicornis Mayr, 1879
- Aenictus ceylonicus Mayr, 1866
- Aenictus clavatus Forel, 1901
  - Aenictus clavatus kanariensis Forel, 1901
- Aenictus clavitibia Forel, 1901
- Aenictus doryloides Wilson, 1964
- Aenictus fergusoni Forel, 1901
- Aenictus gleadowii Forel, 1901
- Aenictus laeviceps Smith, 1857
- Aenictus latiscapus Forel, 1901
- Aenictus longi Forel, 1901
- Aenictus pachycerus Smith, 1858
- Aenictus peguensis Emery, 1895
- Aenictus pubescens Smith, 1859
- Aenictus punensis Forel, 1901
- Aenictus sagei Forel, 1901
- Aenictus shillongensis Mathew and Tiwari, 2000
- Aenictus shuckardi Forel, 1901
- Aenictus westwoodi Forel, 1901
- Aenictus wroughtonii Forel, 1890
- Amblyopone bellii Forel,1900
- Amblyopone pertinax Baroni Urbani, 1978
- Amblyopone rothneyi Forel, 1900
- Anochetus graeffei Mayr, 1870
- Anochetus kanariensis Forel, 1900
- Anochetus madaraszi Mayr, 1897
- Anochetus myops Emery, 1893
- Anochetus obscurior Brown, 1978
- Anochetus orientalis André, 1887
- Anochetus pupulatus Brown, 1978
- Anochetus rufus Jerdon, 1851
- Anochetus sedilloti Emery, 1884
- Anochetus yerburyi Forel, 1900
- Anoplolepis gracilipes Smith, 1857
- Aphaenogaster annandalei Mukerjee, 1930
- Aphaenogaster beccarii Emery, 1887
- Aphaenogaster beesoni Donisthorpe, 1933
- Aphaenogaster cavernicola Donisthorpe, 1938
- Aphaenogaster cristata Forel, 1902
- Aphaenogaster longiceps Smith, 1858
- Aphaenogaster rothneyi Forel, 1902
- Aphaenogaster sagei Forel, 1902
- Aphaenogaster schurri Forel, 1902
- Aphaenogaster smythiesii Forel, 1902
  - Aphaenogaster smythiesii prudens Forel, 1902
- Bothriomyrmex myops Forel, 1895
- Bothriomyrmex walshi Forel, 1895
- Bothriomyrmex wroughtonii Forel, 1895
  - Bothriomyrmex wroughtonii dalyi Forel, 1895
- Calyptomyrmex sp.
- Camponotus aethiops cachmiriensis Emery, 1925
- Camponotus albosparsus Bingham, 1903
- Camponotus angusticollis Jerdon, 1851
  - Camponotus angusticollis sanguinolentus Forel, 1895
- Camponotus arrogans Smith, 1858
- Camponotus barbatus taylori Forel, 1892
- Camponotus binghamii Forel, 1894
- Camponotus buddhae Forel, 1892
- Camponotus camelinus Smith, 1857
- Camponotus carbonarius Latreille, 1802
- Camponotus caryae himalayanus Forel, 1855
- Camponotus ceylonicus Emery, 1925
- Camponotus cinerascens Fabricius, 1787
- Camponotus compressus Fabricius, 1787
- Camponotus confucii Forel, 1894
- Camponotus cotesii Forel, 1893
- Camponotus crassisquamis Forel, 1902
- Camponotus dolendus Forel, 1892
- Camponotus exiguoguttatus Forel, 1886
- Camponotus fallax Nylander, 1856
- Camponotus festinus Smith, 1857
- Camponotus gretae Forel, 1902
- Camponotus holosericeus Emery, 1889
- Camponotus horseshoetus Datta and Raychaudhuri, 1985
- Camponotus invidus Forel, 1892
- Camponotus irritans Smith, 1857
- Camponotus lamarckii Forel, 1892
- Camponotus longi Forel, 1902
- Camponotus luteus Smith, 1858
- Camponotus maculatus basalis Smith, 1878
  - Camponotus maculatus infuscus Forel, 1892
  - Camponotus maculatus pallidus Smith, 1857
- Camponotus megalonyx Wheeler, 1919
- Camponotus mendax Emery, 1895
- Camponotus misturus Smith, 1857
  - Camponotus misturus fornaronis Forel, 1892
- Camponotus mitis Smith,1858
  - Camponotus mitis fuscithorax DallaTorre, 1893
- Camponotus nicobarensis Mayr, 1865
- Camponotus nirvanae Forel, 1893
- Camponotus oblongusbinominatus Forel, 1916
- Camponotus oblongus Smith, 1858
- Camponotus parius Emery, 1889
- Camponotus phragmaticola Donisthorpe, 1943
- Camponotus puniceps Donisthorpe, 1942
- Camponotus radiatus Forel, 1892
- Camponotus reticulatus latitans Forel,1893
  - Camponotus reticulatus yerburyi Forel, 1893
- Camponotus rothneyi Forel, 1893
- Camponotus rufifemur Emery, 1900
- Camponotus rufoglaucus Jerdon, 1851
  - Camponotus rufoglaucus tenuis Forel, 1907
- Camponotus saundersi Emery, 1889
- Camponotus selene Emery, 1889
- Camponotus sericeus Fabricius, 1798
  - Camponotus sericeus opaciventris Mayr, 1879
  - Camponotus sericeus peguensis Emery, 1895
- Camponotus siemsseni Forel, 1901
- Camponotus singularis Smith, 1858
- Camponotus sklarus Bolton, 1995
- Camponotus socrates Forel, 1904
- Camponotus spenceri Clark, 1930
- Camponotus strictus Jerdon, 1851
- Camponotus sylvaticusbasalis Smith, 1878
- Camponotus sylvaticusparadichrous Emery, 1925
- Camponotus thraso Forel, 1893
- Camponotus timidus Jerdon, 1851
- Camponotus variegatus Smith, 1858
  - Camponotus variegatus kattensis Bingham, 1903
  - Camponotus variegatus somnificus Forel, 1902
- Camponotus varius Donisthorpe, 1943
- Camponotus velox Jerdon, 1851
- Camponotus wasmanni Emery, 1893
- Camponotus wroughtonii Forel, 1893
- Cardiocondyla carbonaria Forel, 1907
- Cardiocondyla nuda Mayr, 1866
- Cardiocondyla parvinoda Forel, 1902
- Cardiocondyla wroughtoni Forel, 1890
- Carebara affinis (Jerdon, 1851)
- Carebara diversa (Jerdon, 1851)
- Carebara lignata Westwood, 1840
- Cataglyphis cugiai Menozzi, 1939
- Cataglyphis indicus Pisarski, 1961
- Cataglyphis setipes Forel, 1894
- Cataulacus granulatus Latreille, 1802
- Cataulacus latus Forel, 1891
- Cataulacus simoni Emery, 1893
- Cataulacus taprobanae Smith, 1853
- Centromyrmex feae Emery, 1889
- Cerapachys aitkenii Forel, 1900
- Cerapachys besucheti Brown, 1975
- Cerapachys fossulatus Forel, 1895
- Cerapachys indicus Brown, 1975
- Cerapachys longitarsus Mayr, 1879
- Cerapachys sulcinodis Emery, 1889
- Crematogaster abdominalis Motschoulsky, 1863
- Crematogaster aberrans Forel, 1892
  - Crematogaster aberrans assmuthi Forel, 1913
  - Crematogaster aberrans inglebyi Forel, 1902
- Crematogaster aitkenii Forel, 1902
- Crematogaster anthracina Smith, 1857
- Crematogaster betapicalis Bolton, 1995
- Crematogaster binghamii Forel, 1904
- Crematogaster biroi Mayr, 1897
  - Crematogaster biroi smythiesii Forel, 1902
- Crematogaster brunnea contemta Mayr, 1879
  - Crematogaster brunnea nicevillei Emery, 1922
  - Crematogaster brunnea nilgirica Emery, 1922
- Crematogaster buddhae Forel, 1902
- Crematogaster dalyi Forel, 1902
- Crematogaster dalyi sikkimensis Forel, 1904
- Crematogaster dhorni artifex Mayr, 1879
- Crematogaster diffusa Jerdon, 1851
- Crematogaster diffusa physothorax Emery, 1889
- Crematogaster dohrni Mayr, 1879
- Crematogaster ebenina Forel, 1902
  - Crematogaster ebenina corax Forel, 1902
- Crematogaster himalayana Forel, 1902
- Crematogaster hogsoni Forel, 1902
- Crematogaster kirbii Sykes, 1835
- Crematogaster laboriosa ruginota Santschi, 1928
- Crematogaster millardi Forel, 1902
- Crematogaster modigliani Emery, 1900
- Crematogaster perelegans Forel, 1902
- Crematogaster politula Forel, 1902
- Crematogaster pradipi Tiwari, 1999
- Crematogaster ransonneti Mayr, 1868
- Crematogaster rogenhoferi Mayr, 1879
  - Crematogaster rogenhoferi flava Forel, 1886
  - Crematogaster rogenhoferi lutea Emery, 1893
- Crematogaster rothneyi Mayr, 1879
  - Crematogaster rothneyi civa Forel, 1902
- Crematogaster rufa Jerdon, 1851
- Crematogaster sagei Forel, 1902
  - Crematogaster sagei laevinota Forel, 1902
- Crematogaster soror Forel, 1902
- Crematogaster subnuda Mayr, 1879
- Crematogaster subnudarabula Forel, 1902
- Crematogaster travancorensis Forel, 1902
- Crematogaster walshi Forel, 1902
- Crematogaster wroughtonii Forel, 1902
- Diacamma assamense Forel, 1897
- Diacamma ceylonense Emery, 1897
  - Diacamma ceylonense orbiculatum Santschi, 1932
- Diacamma cyaneiventre André, 1887
- Diacamma geometricum viridipurpureum Emery, 1893
- Diacamma indicum Santschi, 1920
- Diacamma rugosum LeGuillou, 1842
  - Diacamma rugosum jerdoni Forel, 1903
  - Diacamma rugosum rothneyi Forel, 1900
  - Diacamma rugosum sikkimense Forel, 1903
- Diacamma scalpratum Smith, 1858
- Diacamma sculptum Jerdon, 1851
- Diacamma sculpturata Smith, 1859
- Diacamma vagans Smith, 1860
  - Diacamma vagans doveri Mukerjee, 1934
- Dilobocondyla bangalorica Varghese, 2006
- Discothyrea sringerensis Merry and Priyadarsanan, 2004
- Dolichoderus affinis Emery, 1889
  - Dolichoderus affinis glabripes Forel, 1895
- Dolichoderus feae Emery, 1889
  - Dolichoderus feae fuscus Emery, 1889
- Dolichoderus moggridgei Forel, 1886
  - Dolichoderus moggridgei bicolor Santschi, 1920
- Dolichoderus moggridgei lugubris Santschi, 1920
- Dolichoderus sulcaticeps Mayr, 1870
- Dolichoderus sundari, Mathew and Tiwari, 2000
- Dolichoderus taprobanae Smith, 1858
  - Dolichoderus taprobanae gracilipes Mayr, 1879
- Dolichoderus thoracicus Smith, 1860
- Dorylus labiatus Shuckard, 1840
- Dorylus orientalis Westwood, 1835
  - Dorylus orientalis obscuriceps Santschi, 1920

== E-L ==
- Emeryopone sp.nov.
- Formica gagates Latreille, 1798
- Formica gravelyi Mukerjee, 1930
- Formica rufibarbis Fabricius, 1793
- Formica sanguinea Latreille, 1798
- Gnamptogenys bicolor Emery, 1889
- Gnamptogenys coxalis Roger, 1860
- Harpegnathos saltator Jerdon, 1851
- Harpegnathos venator Smith, 1858
- Hypoponera abeillei assmuthi Forel, 1905
- Hypoponera confinis Roger, 1860
  - Hypoponera confinis aitkenii Forel, 1900
  - Hypoponera confinis wroughtonii Forel, 1900
- Hypoponera gleadowi Forel, 1895
- Indomyrma dasypyx Brown, 1986
- Iridomyrmex anceps Roger, 1863
  - Iridomyrmex anceps sikkimensis Forel, 1904
- Iridomyrmex glaber Mayr, 1862
- Kartidris nyos Bolton, 1991
- Lasius alienoflavus Bingham, 1903
- Lasius alienus Foerster, 1850
- Lasius bicornis Foerster, 1850
- Lasius breviscapus Seifert, 1992
- Lasius brunneus Latreille, 1798
- Lasius crinitus Smith, 1858
- Lasius fuliginosus Latreille, 1798
- Lasius himalayanus Bingham, 1903
- Lasius mikir Collingwood, 1982
- Lepisiota annandalei Mukerjee, 1930
- Lepisiota capensis Mayr, 1862
  - Lepisiota capensis simplex Forel, 1892
- Lepisiota fergusoni Forel, 1895
- Lepisiota frauenfeldi Mayr, 1855
  - Lepisiota frauenfeldi integra Forel, 1894
- Lepisiota modesta Forel, 1894
- Lepisiota opaca Forel, 1892
  - Lepisiota opaca pulchella Forel, 1892
- Lepisiota rothneyi Forel, 1894
  - Lepisiota rothneyi wroughtonii Forel, 1902
- Lepisiota sericea Forel, 1892
- Leptanilla escheri Kutter, 1948
- Leptogenys assamensis Forel, 1900
- Leptogenys birmana Forel, 1900
- Leptogenys carinata Donisthorpe, 1943
- Leptogenys chinensis Mayr, 1870
- Leptogenys dalyi Forel, 1900
- Leptogenys dentilobis Forel, 1900
- Leptogenys diminuta Smith, 1857
  - Leptogenys diminuta deceptrix Forel, 1901
  - Leptogenys diminuta diminutolaeviceps Forel, 1900
  - Leptogenys diminuta palliseri Forel, 1900
  - Leptogenys diminuta woodmasoni Forel, 1886
- Leptogenys emiliae Forel, 1902
- Leptogenys hysterica Forel, 1900
- Leptogenys iridipennis Smith, 1858
- Leptogenys jeanettei Mathew and Tiwari, 2000
- Leptogenys kitteli Mayr, 1870
  - Leptogenys kittteli minor Forel, 1900
- Leptogenys longiscapa Donisthorpe, 1943
- Leptogenys minchinii Forel, 1900
- Leptogenys moelleri Bingham, 1903
- Leptogenys peuqueti André, 1887
- Leptogenys processionalis Jerdon, 1851
- Leptogenys punctiventris Mayr, 1879
- Leptogenys roberti Forel, 1900
  - Leptogenys roberti coonoorensis Forel, 1900
- Leptogenys stenocheilos Jerdon, 1851
- Leptogenys yerburyi Forel, 1900
- Leptothorax desioi Menozzi, 1939
  - Leptothorax desioi melanicus Menozzi, 1939
- Leptothorax fultonii Forel, 1902
- Leptothorax inermis Forel, 1902
- Leptothorax rothneyi Forel, 1902
  - Leptothorax rothneyi simlensis Forel, 1904
- Leptothorax schurri Forel, 1902
- Leptothorax wroughtonii Forel, 1904
- Liometopum lindgreeni Forel, 1902
- Lophomyrmex ambiguus Rigato, 1994
- Lophomyrmex bedoti Emery, 1893
- Lophomyrmex birmanus Emery, 1893
- Lophomyrmex kali Rigato, 1994
- Lophomyrmex quadrispinosus Jerdon, 1851

== M-R ==
- Meranoplus bellii Forel, 1902
- Meranoplus bicolor Guérin-Méneville, 1844
  - Meranoplus bicolor lucidus Forel, 1903
- Meranoplus carinatus Donisthorpe, 1942
- Meranoplus flaviventris Donisthorpe, 1943
- Meranoplus laeviventris Emery, 1889
- Meranoplus levis Donisthorpe, 1942
- Meranoplus rothneyi Forel, 1902
- Messor barbarus Linnaeus, 1767
- Messor himalayanus Forel, 1902
- Messor instabilis Smith, 1858
- Messor minor André, 1883
- Monomorium aberrans Forel, 1902
- Monomorium atomum Forel, 1902
  - Monomorium atomum integrium Forel, 1902
- Monomorium biroi Forel, 1907
- Monomorium criniceps Mayr, 1879
  - Monomorium criniceps nigrum Forel, 1902
- Monomorium destructor Jerdon, 1851
- Monomorium dichroum Forel, 1902
- Monomorium floricola Jerdon, 1851
- Monomorium glabrum André, 1883
  - Monomorium glabrum clarum Forel, 1902
  - Monomorium glabrum glabrocriniceps Forel, 1902
- Monomorium indicum Forel, 1902
- Monomorium kempi Mukerjee, 1930
- Monomorium latinode Mayr, 1872
- Monomorium longi Forel, 1902
- Monomorium luisae Forel, 1904
- Monomorium mayri Forel, 1902
- Monomorium orientale Mayr, 1879
- Monomorium pharaonis Linnaeus, 1758
- Monomorium sagei Forel, 1902
- Monomorium scabriceps Mayr, 1879
  - Monomorium scabriceps crinicipitoscabriceps Forel, 1902
- Monomorium schurri Forel, 1902
- Monomorium subopacum Smith, 1858
- Monomorium wroughtoni Forel, 1902
- Monomorium wroughtonianum Ettershank, 1966
- Myopopone castanea Smith, 1860
- Myrmecina pilicornis Smith, 1858
- Myrmecina striata Emery, 1889
- Myrmecina urbanii Tiwari, 1994
- Myrmecina vidyae Tiwari, 1994
- Myrmica aimonissabaudiae Menozzi, 1939
- Myrmica beesoni Mukerjee, 1934
- Myrmica breviceps Smith, 1878
- Myrmica debilior Forel, 1902
- Myrmica dicaporiacoi Menozzi, 1939
- Myrmica ereptrix Bolton, 1988
- Myrmica indica Weber, 1950
- Myrmica inezae Forel, 1902
- Myrmica luctuosa Smith, 1878
- Myrmica margaritae Emery, 1889
- Myrmica pachei Forel, 1906
- Myrmica rugifrons Smith, 1858
- Myrmica rugosa Mayr, 1865
  - Myrmica rugosa debilior Forel, 1902
- Myrmica smythiesii Forel, 1902
  - Myrmica smythiesii hecate Weber, 1947
  - Myrmica smythiesii cachmiriensis Forel, 1904
  - Myrmica smythiesii carbonaria Forel, 1902
  - Myrmica smythiesii fortior Forel, 1904
  - Myrmica smythiesii himalayana Weber, 1947
  - Myrmica smythiesii lutescens Menozzi, 1939
  - Myrmica smythiesii rupestris Forel, 1902
- Myrmicaria birmana Forel, 1902
- Myrmicaria brunnea Saunders, 1842
- Myrmicaria fodica Jerdon, 1851
- Myrmoteras binghamii Forel, 1893
- Myrmoteras brachygnathum Moffett, 1985
- Myrmoteras indicum Moffett, 1985
- Myrmoteras scabrum Moffett, 1985
- Odontomachus haematodus Linnaeus, 1758
- Odontomachus monticola Emery, 1892
- Odontomachus rixosus Smith, 1857
- Odontomachus simillimus Smith, 1858
- Odontoponera transversa Smith, 1857
- Oecophylla smaragdina Fabricius, 1775
- Oligomyrmex aborensis Wheeler, 1913
- Oligomyrmex asinus Forel, 1902
- Oligomyrmex bengalensis Forel, 1902
- Oligomyrmex lamellifrons Forel, 1902
- Oligomyrmex leei Forel, 1902
- Oligomyrmex nayana Sheela and Narendran, 1997
- Oligomyrmex raja Forel, 1902
- Oligomyrmex rothneyi Forel, 1902
- Oligomyrmex wroughtonii Forel, 1902
- Pachycondyla amblyops Emery, 1887
- Pachycondyla annamita André, 1892
- Pachycondyla arcuata Karavaiev, 1925
- Pachycondyla astuta Smith, 1858
- Pachycondyla bispinosa Smith, 1858
- Pachycondyla crassa Emery, 1877
- Pachycondyla darwinii Forel, 1893
  - Pachycondyla darwinii indica Emery, 1899
- Pachycondyla henryi Donisthorpe, 1942
- Pachycondyla javana Mayr, 1867
- Pachycondyla jerdonii Forel, 1900
- Pachycondyla leeuwenhoeki Forel, 1886
- Pachycondyla luteipes Mayr, 1862
  - Pachycondyla luteipes continentalis Karavaiev, 1925
- Pachycondyla melanaria Emery, 1893
- Pachycondyla nigrita Emery, 1895
- Pachycondyla rubiginosa Emery, 1889
- Pachycondyla rufipes Jerdon, 1851
- Pachycondyla stigma Fabricius, 1804
- Pachycondyla striolata Donisthorpe, 1933
- Pachycondyla sulcata Mayr, 1867
  - Pachycondyla sulcata fossulata Forel, 1900
  - Pachycondyla sulcata sulcatotesserinoda Forel,1900
- Pachycondyla tesseronoda Emery, 1977
- Pachycondyla wroughtonii Forel, 1901
- Paratopula ceylonica Emery, 1901
- Paratopula intermedia Sheela and Narendran, 1998
- Paratrechina aseta Forel, 1902
- Paratrechina assimilis Jerdon, 1851
- Paratrechina bourbonica Forel, 1886
- Paratrechina indica Forel, 1894
- Paratrechina longicornis Latreille, 1802
- Paratrechina smythiesii Forel, 1894
- Paratrechina taylori Forel, 1894
- Paratrechina yerburyi Forel, 1894
- Pheidole allani Bingham, 1903
- Pheidole bhavanae Bingham, 1903
- Pheidole capellinii Emery, 1887
- Pheidole constanciae Forel, 1902
  - Pheidole constanciae nigra Forel, 1902
- Pheidole diffusa Jerdon, 1851
- Pheidole feae Emery, 1895
- Pheidole fergusoni Forel, 1902
- Pheidole fervens Smith, 1858
- Pheidole ghatica Forel, 1902
- Pheidole grayi Forel, 1902
- Pheidole hoogwerfi Forel, 1902
- Pheidole hospita Bingham, 1903
- Pheidole indica Mayr, 1879
  - Pheidole indica coonoorensis Forel, 1902
  - Pheidole indica himalayana Forel, 1902
  - Pheidole indica rotschana Forel, 1902
- Pheidole jucunda Forel, 1885
  - Pheidole jucunda fossulata Forel, 1902
- Pheidole lamellinoda Forel, 1902
- Pheidole lanuginosa Wilson, 1984
- Pheidole latinoda Roger, 1863
  - Pheidole latinoda angustior Forel, 1902
  - Pheidole latinoda major Forel, 1885
- Pheidole malabarica Jerdon, 1851
- Pheidole malinsii Forel, 1902
- Pheidole minor Jerdon, 1851
- Pheidole multidens Forel, 1902
- Pheidole mus Forel, 1902
- Pheidole naoroji Forel, 1902
- Pheidole noda Smith, 1874
  - Pheidole noda stella Forel, 1911
- Pheidole parasitica Wilson, 1984
- Pheidole parva Mayr, 1865
  - Pheidole parva decanica Forel, 1902
- Pheidole peguensis Emery, 1895
- Pheidole phipsoni Forel, 1902
- Pheidole plagiaria Smith, 1860
- Pheidole pronotalis Forel, 1902
- Pheidole providens Sykes, 1835
- Pheidole roberti Forel, 1902
- Pheidole rogersi taylori Forel, 1902
- Pheidole sagei Forel, 1902
- Pheidole sepulchralis Bingham, 1903
- Pheidole sharpi Forel, 1902
- Pheidole smythiesii Forel, 1902
  - Pheidole smythiesii bengalensis Forel, 1902
- Pheidole spathifera Forel, 1902
  - Pheidole spathifera aspatha Forel, 1902
- Pheidole striativentris Mayr, 1879
- Pheidole sulcaticeps Roger, 1863
  - Pheidole sulcaticeps punensis Forel, 1902
  - Pheidole sulcaticeps yeensis Forel, 1902
- Pheidole sykesii Forel, 1902
- Pheidole templaria Forel, 1902
- Pheidole watsoni Forel, 1902
- Pheidole woodmasoni Forel, 1885
- Pheidole wroughtonii Forel, 1902
- Plagiolepis balestrierii Menozzi, 1939
- Plagiolepis dichroa Forel, 1902
- Plagiolepis exigua Forel, 1894
- Plagiolepis jerdonii Forel, 1894
- Plagiolepis moelleri Bingham, 1903
- Plagiolepis pontii Menozzi, 1939
- Plagiolepis rogeri Forel, 1894
- Platythyrea parallela Smith, 1859
- Platythyrea sagei Forel, 1900
- Polyrhachis aculeata Mayr, 1879
- Polyrhachis armata Le Guillou, 1842
  - Polyrhachis armata defensa Smith, 1857
- Polyrhachis bicolor Smith, 1858
- Polyrhachis bihamata Drury, 1773
- Polyrhachis binghamii Forel, 1893
- Polyrhachis dives belli Forel, 1912
- Polyrhachis dives Smith, 1857
- Polyrhachis exercita lucidiventris Forel, 1907
  - Polyrhachis exercita obtusisquama Forel, 1902
- Polyrhachis exercita Walker, 1859
  - Polyrhachis exercita rastrata Emery, 1889
- Polyrhachis furcata Smith, 1858
- Polyrhachis gracilior Forel, 1893
- Polyrhachis halidayi Emery, 1889
- Polyrhachis hastata Latreille, 1802
- Polyrhachis hector Smith, 1857
- Polyrhachis hemiopticoides Mukerjee, 1930
- Polyrhachis hippomanes ceylonensis Emery, 1893
- Polyrhachis horni Emery, 1901
- Polyrhachis illaudata Walker, 1859
  - Polyrhachis illaudata intermedia Forel, 1886
- Polyrhachis indificans Jerdon, 1851
- Polyrhachis karawaiewi Santschi, 1928
- Polyrhachis lacteipennis Smith, 1858
  - Polyrhachis lacteipennis obsoleta Forel, 1893
- Polyrhachis laevissima Smith, 1858
  - Polyrhachis laevissima dichroa Forel, 1893
- Polyrhachis marginata Smith, 1859
- Polyrhachis menelas Forel, 1904
- Polyrhachis proxima Roger, 1863
- Polyrhachis pubescens Mayr, 1879
- Polyrhachis punctillata Roger, 1863
  - Polyrhachis punctillata fergusoni Forel, 1902
  - Polyrhachis puntillata smythiesii Forel, 1895
- Polyrhachis rastellata Latreille, 1802
  - Polyrhachis rastellata corporaali Santschi, 1928
  - Polyrhachis rastellata pagana Santschi, 1928
- Polyrhachis relucens Latreille, 1802
- Polyrhachis rufipes Smith, 1858
- Polyrhachis sexspinosa Latreille, 1802
- Polyrhachis striata Mayr, 1862
  - Polyrhachis striata assamensis Forel, 1902
- Polyrhachis sumatrensis hamulata Emery, 1887
  - Polyrhachis sumatrensis striatorugosa Mayr, 1862
- Polyrhachis sylvicola Jerdon, 1851
- Polyrhachis thompsoni Bingham, 1903
- Polyrhachis thrinax Roger, 1863
  - Polyrhachis thrinax lancearia Forel, 1893
- Polyrhachis tibialis Smith, 1858
- Polyrhachis tubericeps Forel, 1893
- Polyrhachis wroughtonii Forel, 1894
- Prenolepis naoroji Forel, 1902
- Proceratium williamsi Mathew and Tiwari, 2000
- Pseudolasius familiaris Smith, 1860
- Pyramica sp.
- Recurvidris recurvispinosa Forel, 1890
- Rhoptromyrmex mayri Forel, 1912
- Rhoptromyrmex wroughtonii Forel, 1902

== S-Z ==
- Solenopsis geminata Fabricius, 1804
- Sphinctomyrmex taylori Forel, 1900
- Stenamma wilsoni Bharti, Gul & Sharma, 2012
- Stenamma jhitingriense Bharti, Gul & Sharma, 2012
- Strumigenys emmae Emery, 1890
- Strumigenys godeffroyi Mayr, 1866
- Strumigenys lewisi Cameron, 1886
- Strumigenys smythiesii Forel, 1902
- Tapinoma annandalei Wheeler, 1928
- Tapinoma indicum Forel, 1895
- Tapinoma luffae Kurian, 1955
- Tapinoma melanocephalum Fabricius, 1793
- Tapinoma wroughtonii Forel, 1904
- Technomyrmex albipes Smith, 1861
  - Technomyrmex albipes bruneipes Forel, 1895
  - Technomyrmex albipes brunneus Forel, 1895
- Technomyrmex elatior Forel, 1902
- Technomyrmex incisus Mukerjee, 1930
- Tetramorium barryi Mathew, 1980
- Tetramorium belgaense Forel, 1902
- Tetramorium bicarinatum Nylander, 1846
- Tetramorium browni Bolton, 1980
- Tetramorium caespitum Linnaeus, 1758
- Tetramorium christiei Forel, 1902
- Tetramorium coonoorense Forel, 1902
- Tetramorium cordatus Sheela and Narendran, 1998
- Tetramorium decamerum Forel, 1902
- Tetramorium elisabethae Forel, 1904
- Tetramorium fergusoni Forel, 1902
- Tetramorium guineense Bernard, 1953
- Tetramorium inglebyi Forel, 1902
- Tetramorium keralensis Sheela and Narendran, 1998
- Tetramorium lanuginosum Mayr, 1870
- Tetramorium malabarensis Sheela and Narendran, 1998
- Tetramorium mixtum Forel, 1902
- Tetramorium myops Bolton, 1977
- Tetramorium nursei Bingham, 1903
- Tetramorium obesum André, 1887
- Tetramorium petiolatus Sheela and Narendran, 1998
- Tetramorium pilosum Emery, 1893
- Tetramorium rossi Bolton, 1976
- Tetramorium rothneyi Forel, 1902
- Tetramorium rugigaster Bolton, 1977
- Tetramorium salvatum Forel, 1902
- Tetramorium sentosus Sheela and Narendran, 1998
- Tetramorium simillimum Smith, 1851
- Tetramorium smithi Mayr, 1879
- Tetramorium tortuosum Roger, 1863
- Tetramorium walshi Forel, 1890
- Tetramorium wroughtoni Forel, 1902
- Tetraponera aitkenii Forel, 1902
- Tetraponera allaborans Walker, 1859
- Tetraponera attenuata Smith,1877
- Tetraponera binghami Forel, 1902
- Tetraponera modesta Smith, 1860
- Tetraponera nigra Jerdon, 1858
- Tetraponera nitida Smith, 1860
- Tetraponera rufonigra Jerdon, 1851
- Vollenhovia acanthina Karavaiev, 1935
- Vollenhovia oblonga laevithorax Emery, 1889
- Vombisidris humboldticola Merry and Priyadarsanan, 2004
- Yavnella indica Kugler, 1987

== Gallery ==
Some common ant species in PONDIYA <ref>Identifying common ants: Pronoy Baidya</ref>

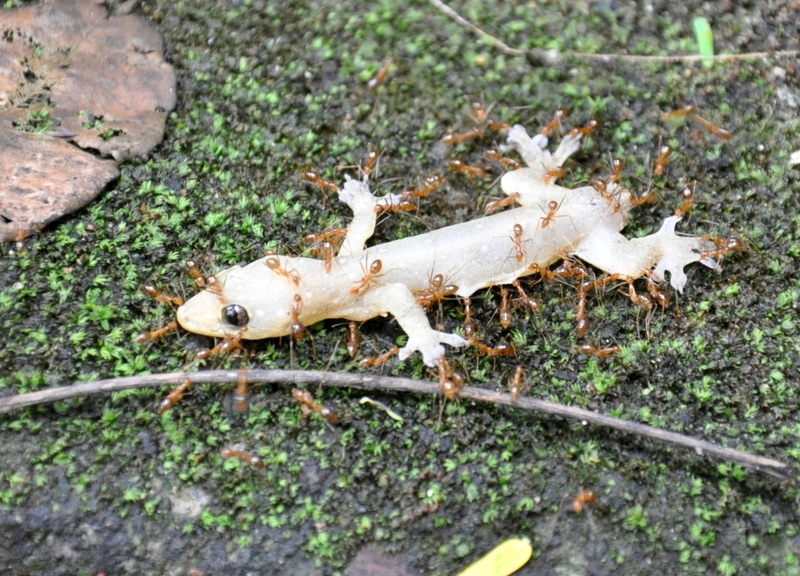
Anoplolepis gracilipes (Crazy yellow ants)

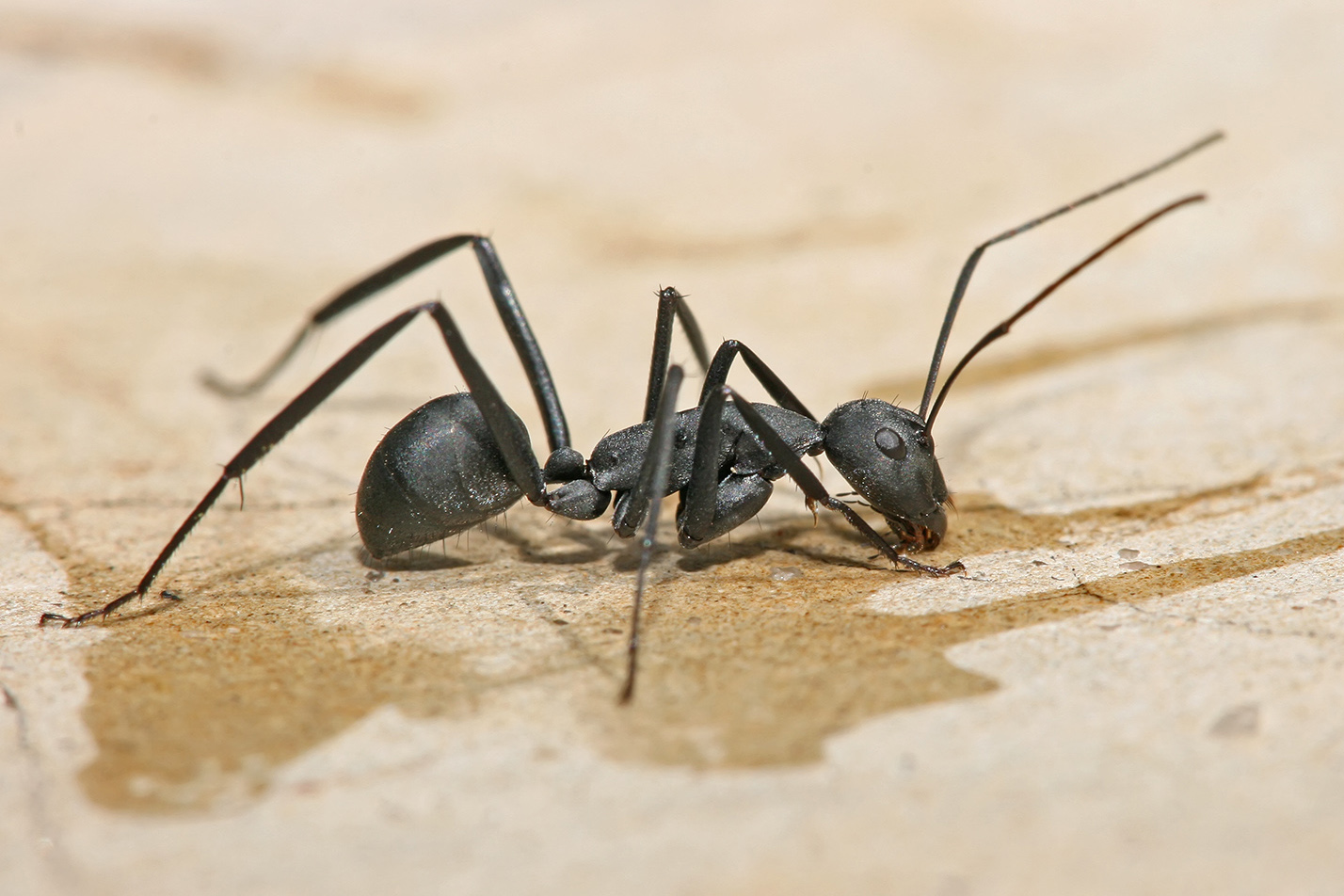
Camponotus sp. (Carpenter ant)

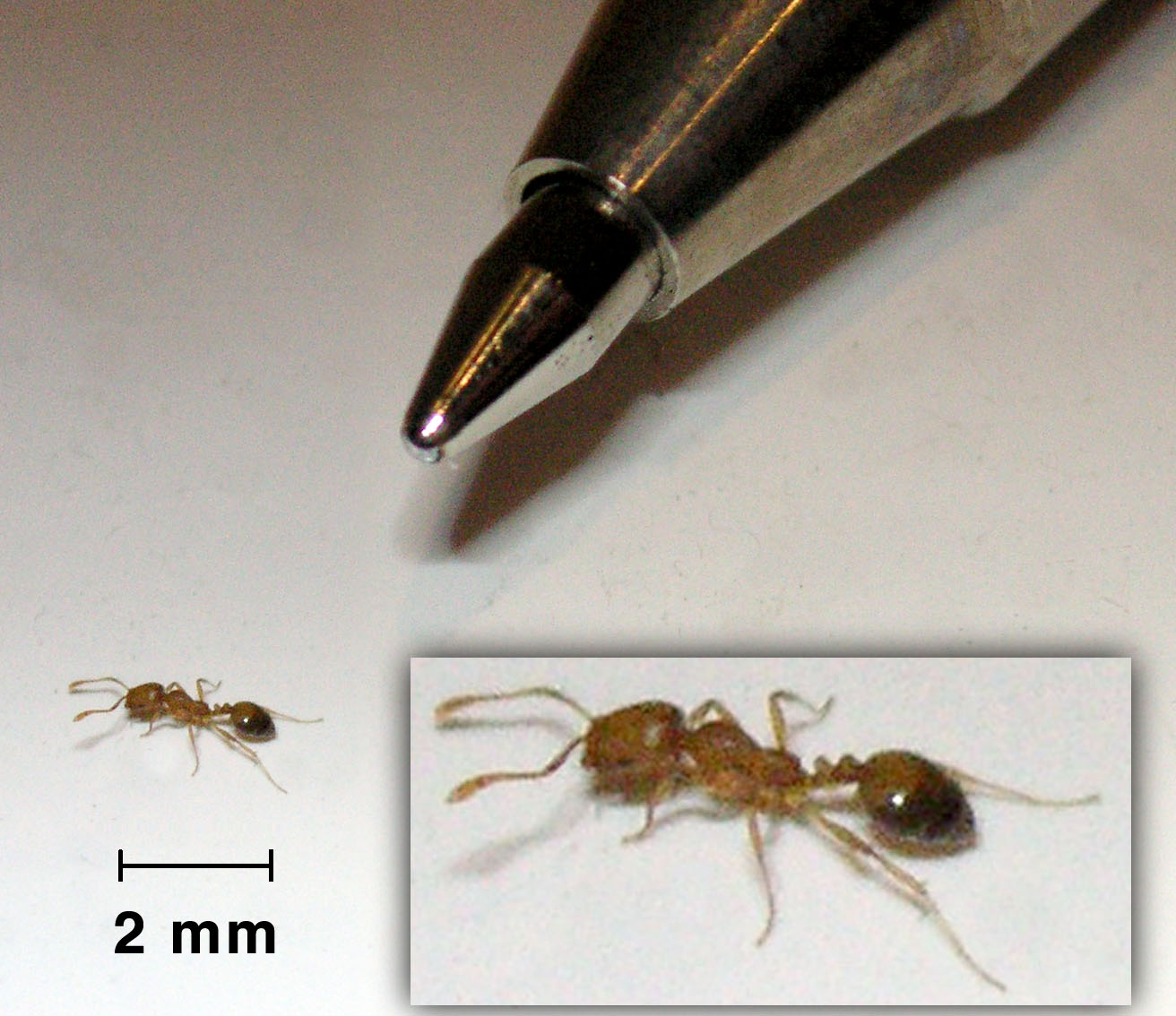
Monomorium pharaonis (Pharaoh ant)

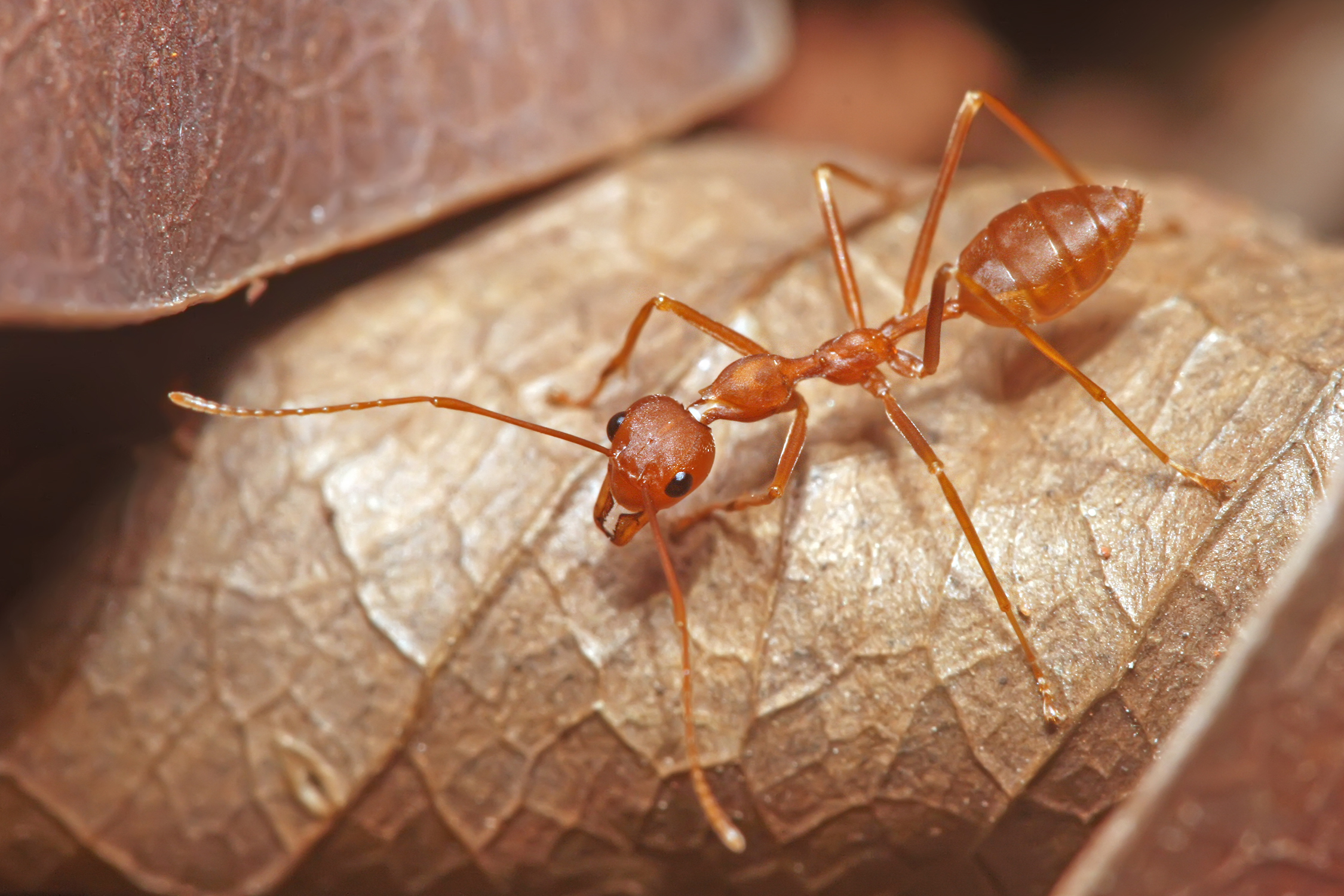
Oecophylla smaragdina (Red Weaver ant)

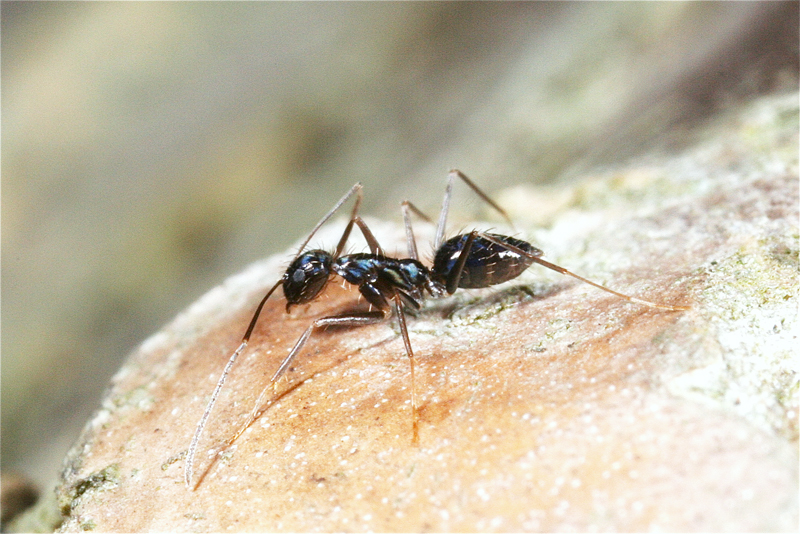
Paratrechina longicornis (Black Crazy ants)

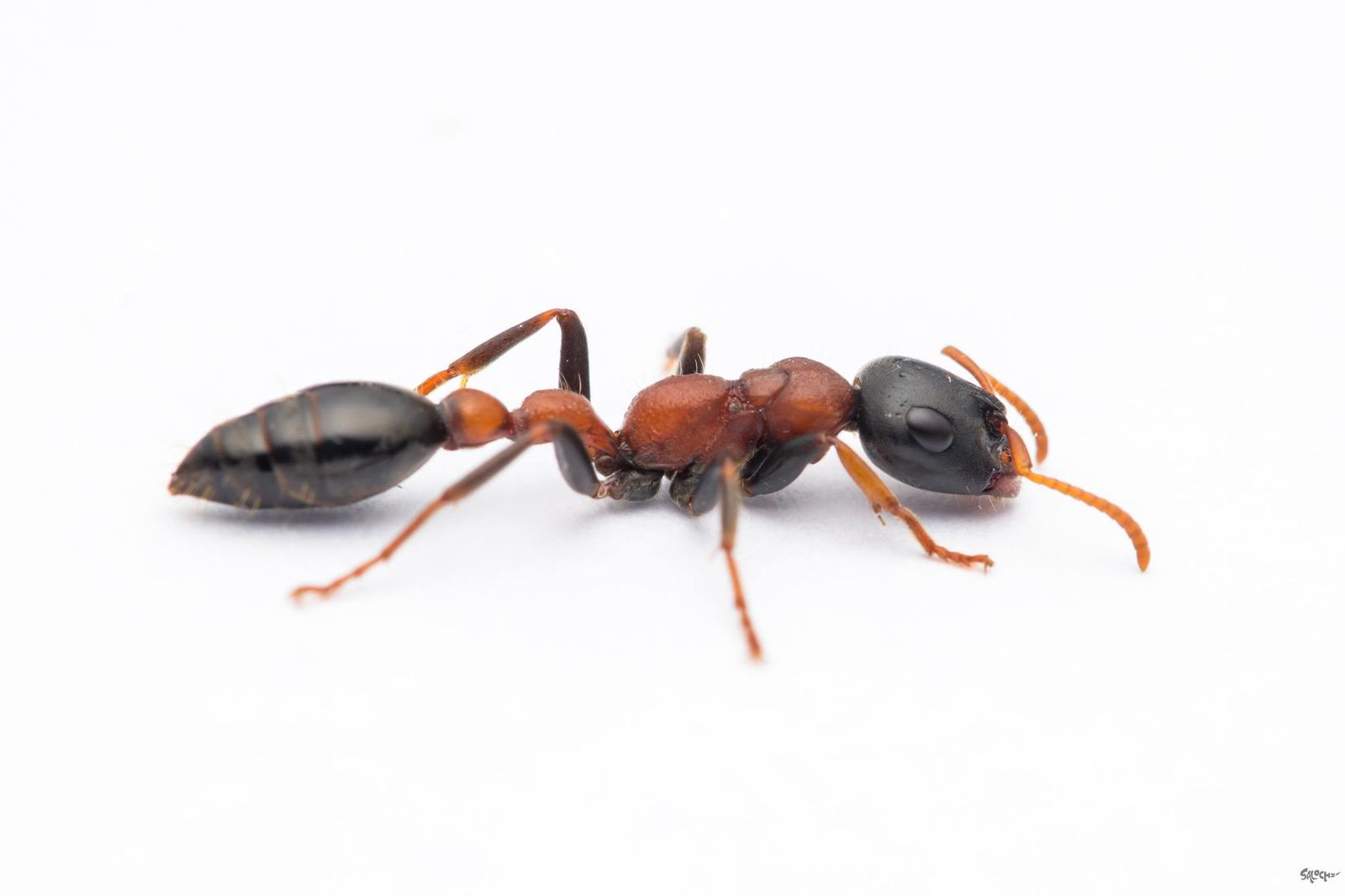
Tetraponera rufonigra (Arboreal Bicolor ant)

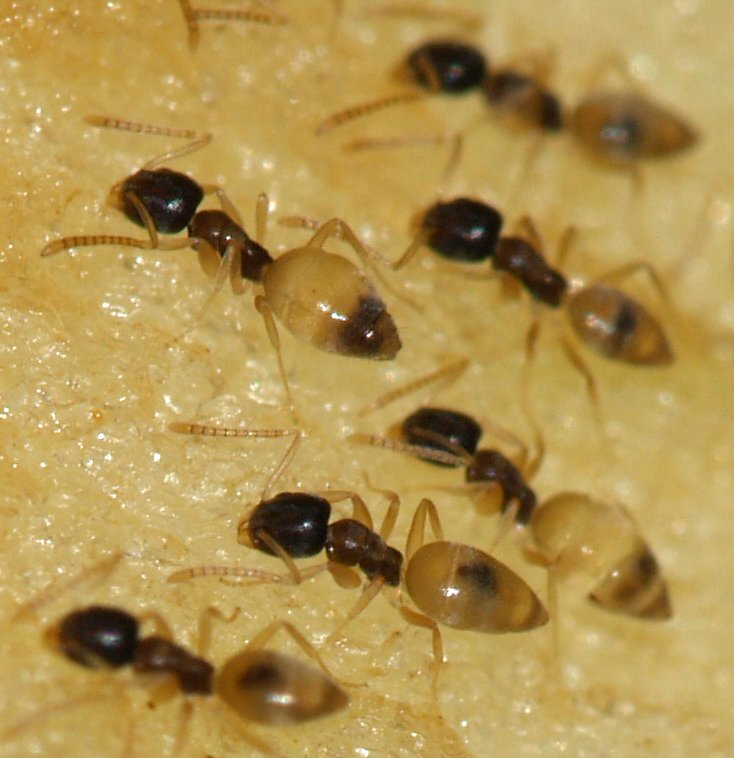
Tapinoma melanocephalum (Ghost ants)
