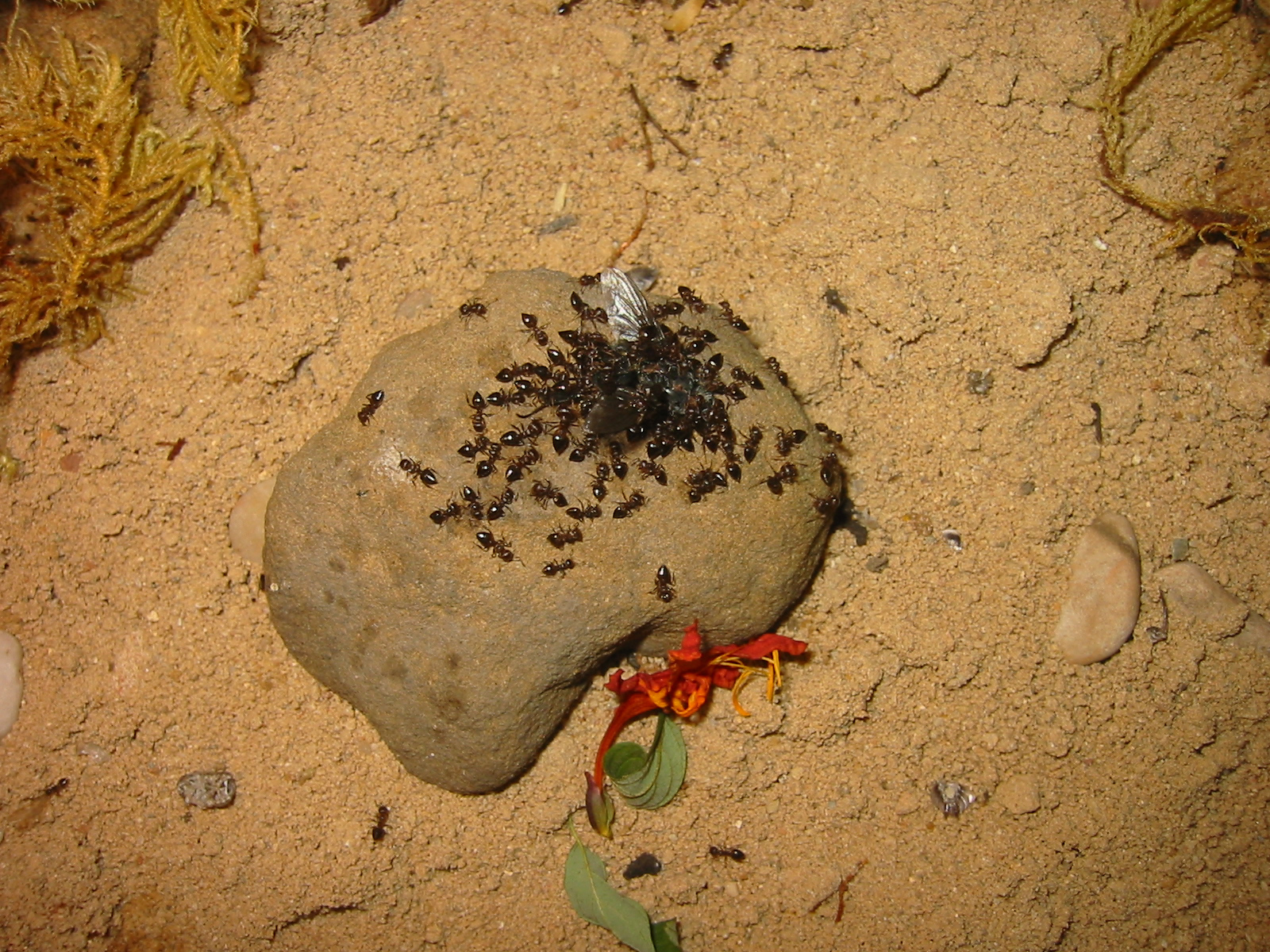

Scientific classification
- Kingdom: Animalia
- Phylum: Arthropoda
- Clade: Pancrustacea
- Class: Insecta
- Order: Hymenoptera
- Family: Formicidae
- Subfamily: Myrmicinae
- Genus: Crematogaster
- Species: C. rogenhoferi

Binomial name
- Crematogaster rogenhoferi Mayr, 1879

= Crematogaster rogenhoferi =

Species of ant

Crematogaster rogenhoferi is a species of ant of the subfamily Myrmicinae that can be found in Sri Lanka.

== Subspecies ==
- Crematogaster rogenhoferi costulata Emery, 1895 - Myanmar
- Crematogaster rogenhoferi fictrix Forel, 1911 - Borneo
- Crematogaster rogenhoferi lutea Emery, 1893 - Indonesia
- Crematogaster rogenhoferi rogenhoferi Mayr, 1879 - Borneo, Philippines, India, Sri Lanka, Myanmar, Thailand, Vietnam, China
