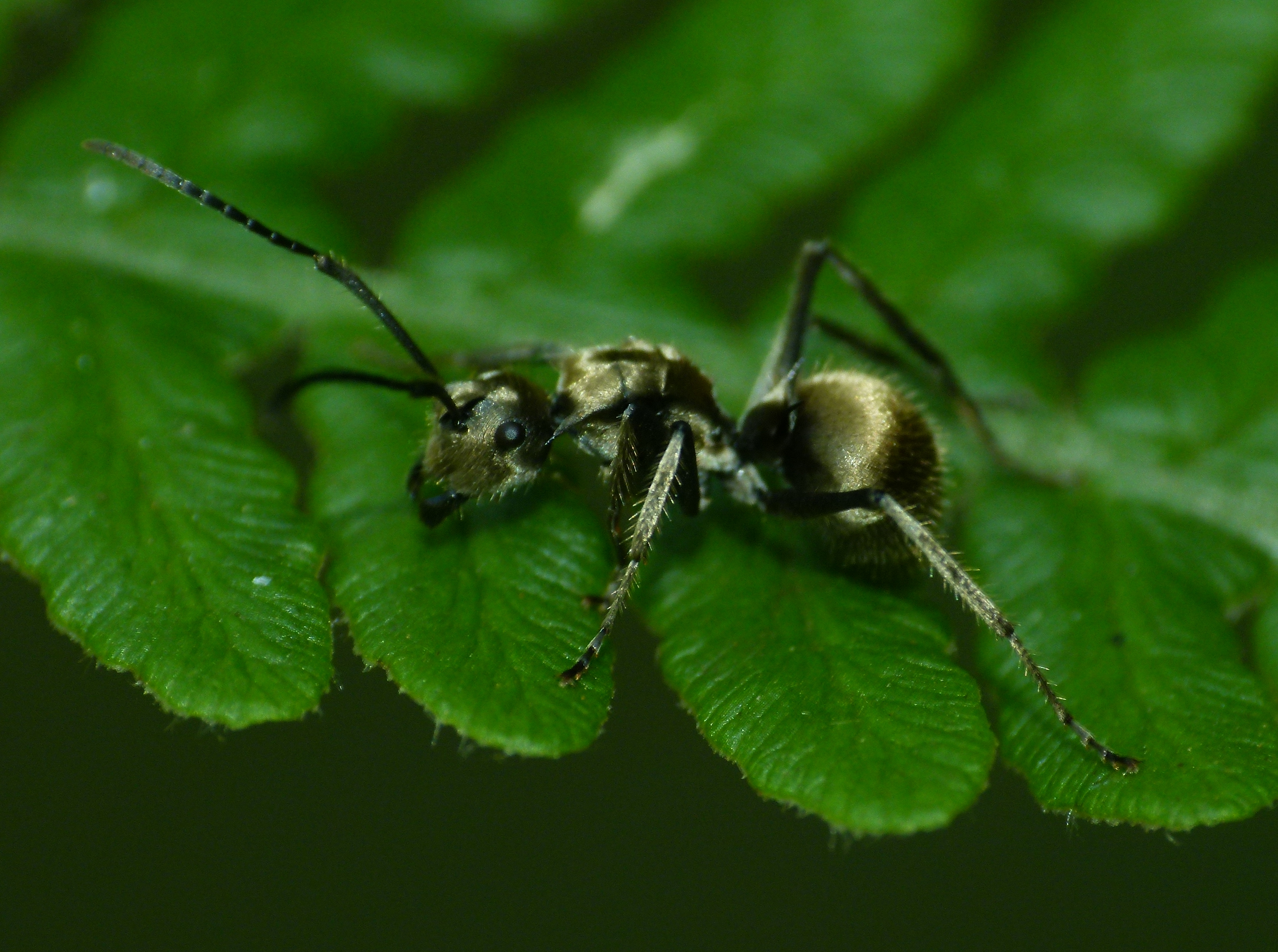
- Worker from India

Scientific classification
- Kingdom: Animalia
- Phylum: Arthropoda
- Clade: Pancrustacea
- Class: Insecta
- Order: Hymenoptera
- Family: Formicidae
- Subfamily: Formicinae
- Genus: Polyrhachis
- Subgenus: Myrma
- Species: P. illaudata

Binomial name
- Polyrhachis illaudata Walker, 1859

= Polyrhachis illaudata =

Species of ant

Polyrhachis illaudata is a species of large ant found in Sri Lanka, India extending through Southeast Asia to the Philippines. The colonies have a single queen and nest within wood.
