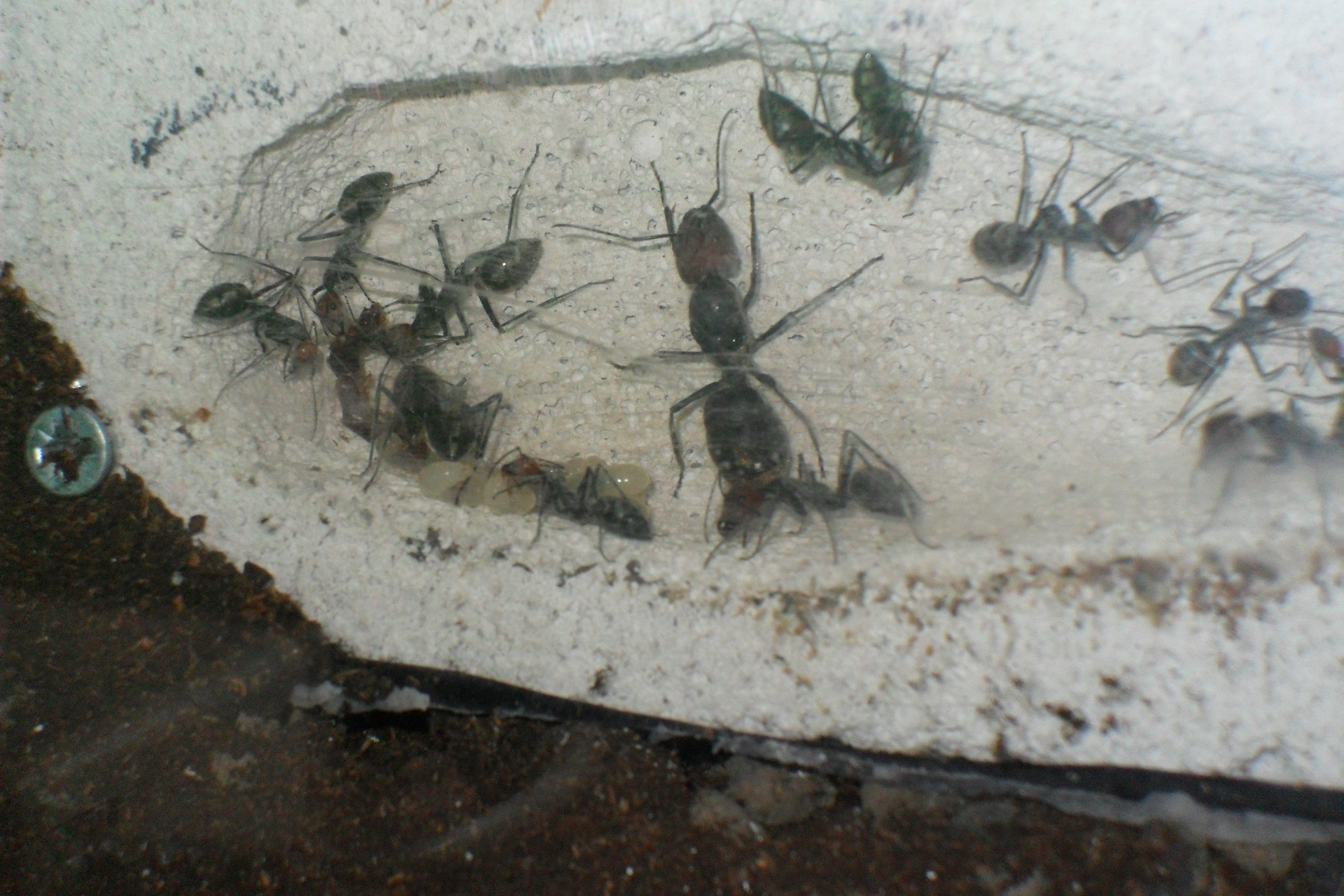

Scientific classification
- Domain: Eukaryota
- Kingdom: Animalia
- Phylum: Arthropoda
- Class: Insecta
- Order: Hymenoptera
- Family: Formicidae
- Subfamily: Formicinae
- Genus: Camponotus
- Subgenus: Myrmosaulus
- Species: C. singularis

Binomial name
- Camponotus singularis Smith, 1858

= Camponotus singularis =

Species of ant from south Asia

Camponotus singularis is a species of ant that is native to Asia. It is a large species, with workers' sizes reaching up to 18 mm (0.71 in) and queens reaching up to 20 mm (0.79 in). It usually has a red head and a black/grey body. Sometimes Camponotus singularis colonies live in the top and middle sections of tropical rainforest canopies. It occupies a large range, from Nepal to the islands of Borneo and Java.
