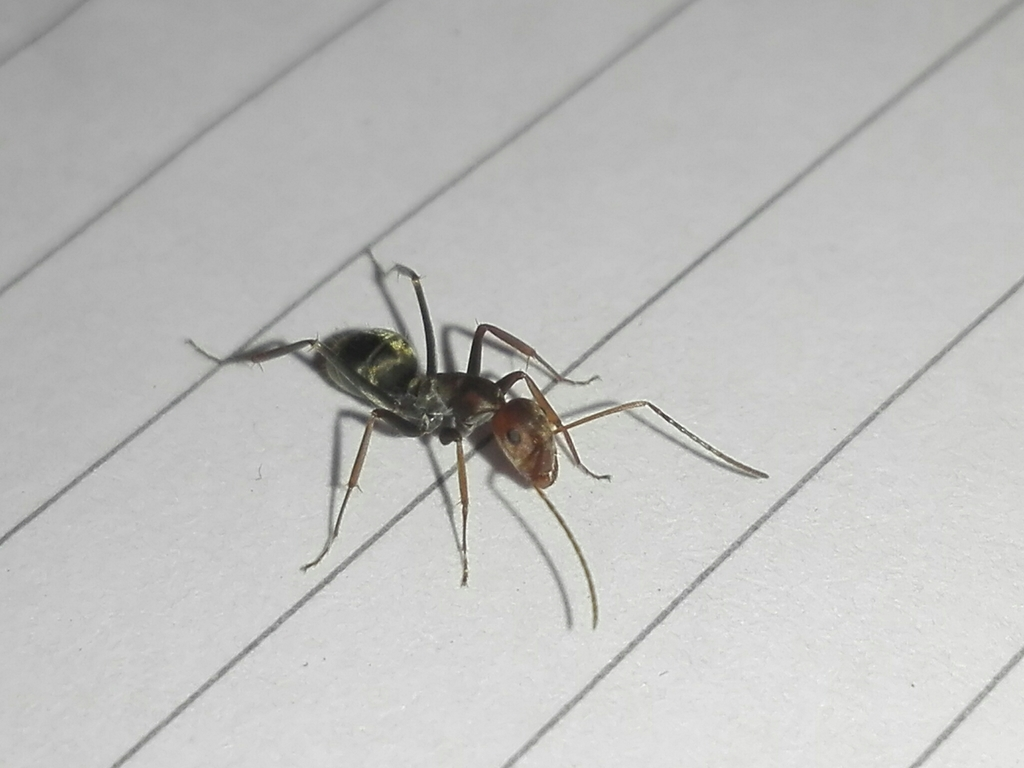
- Worker in Trincomalee, Sri Lanka

Scientific classification
- Kingdom: Animalia
- Phylum: Arthropoda
- Clade: Pancrustacea
- Class: Insecta
- Order: Hymenoptera
- Family: Formicidae
- Subfamily: Formicinae
- Genus: Camponotus
- Subgenus: Myrmosericus
- Species: C. rufoglaucus

Binomial name
- Camponotus rufoglaucus (Jerdon, 1851)

Subspecies
- 8. See text

Synonyms
- Camponotus redtenbacheri Mayr, 1862

= Camponotus rufoglaucus =

Species of ant

Camponotus rufoglaucus is a species of carpenter ant (genus Camponotus). It is found from many Afrotropical, Indo-Australian, Oriental, Palaearctic regional countries.

== Subspecies ==
- Camponotus rufoglaucus controversus Santschi, 1916 - Tanzania
- Camponotus rufoglaucus feae Emery, 1882 - Canary Islands
- Camponotus rufoglaucus latericius Stitz, 1923 - Namibia
- Camponotus rufoglaucus rufoglaucus Jerdon, 1851 - India, Sri Lanka, Kenya, Namibia, Rwanda, Zimbabwe, Borneo, Bangladesh, Cambodia, Thailand, Vietnam, Nepal, Canary Islands, China
- Camponotus rufoglaucus syphax Wheeler, W.M., 1922 - Democratic Republic of Congo
- Camponotus rufoglaucus tenuis Forel, 1907 - India
- Camponotus rufoglaucus zanzibaricus Forel, 1911 - Tanzania
- Camponotus rufoglaucus zulu Emery, 1895 - South Africa

== Gallery ==
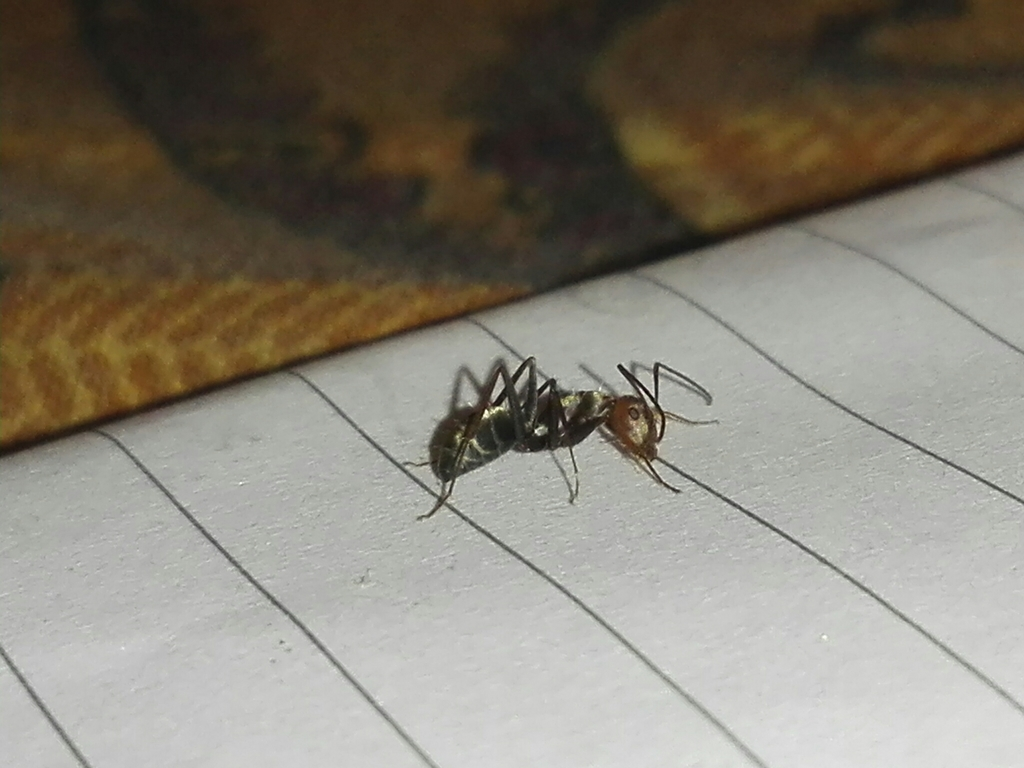
Lateral view

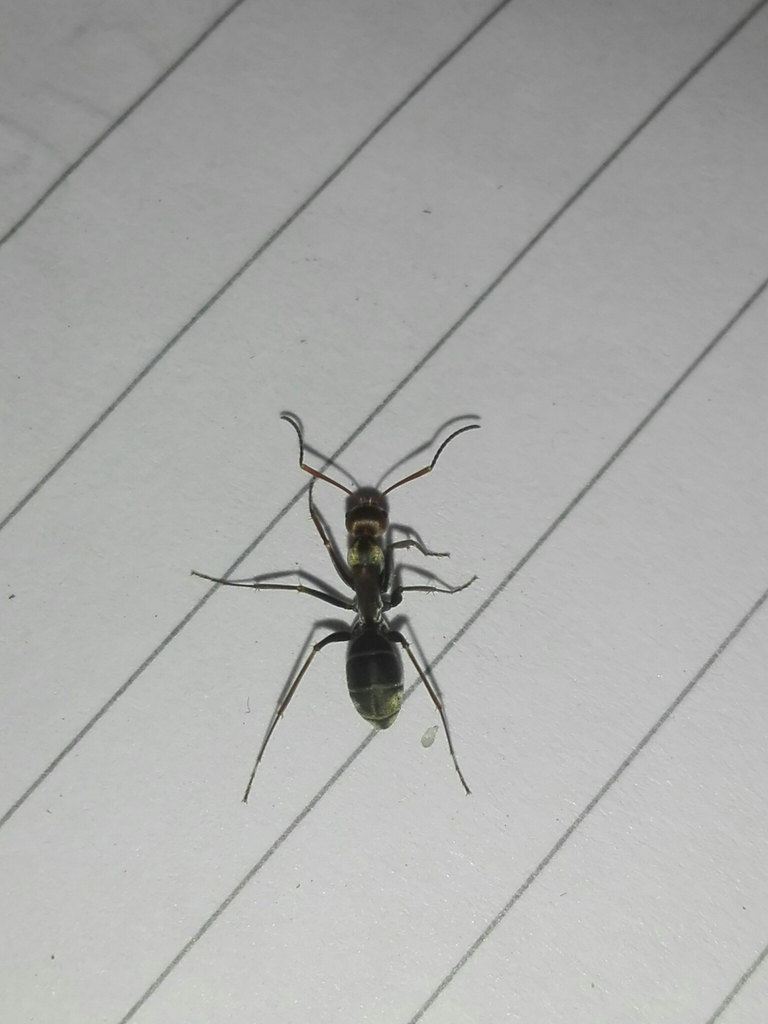
Dorsal view

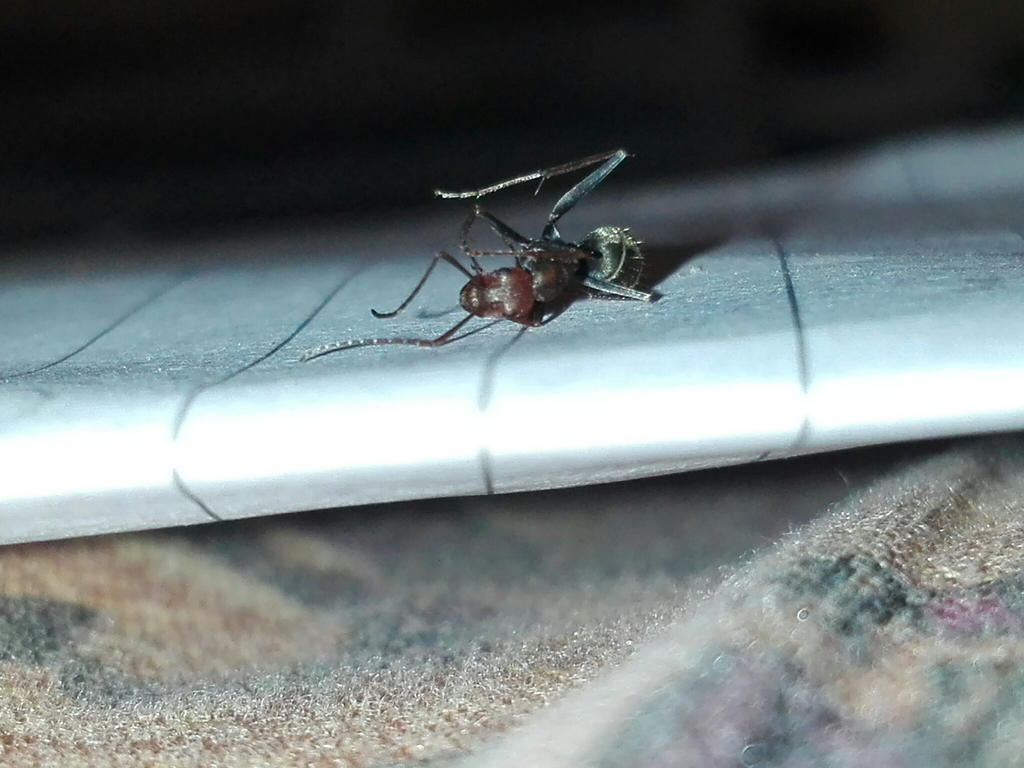
Anterior view

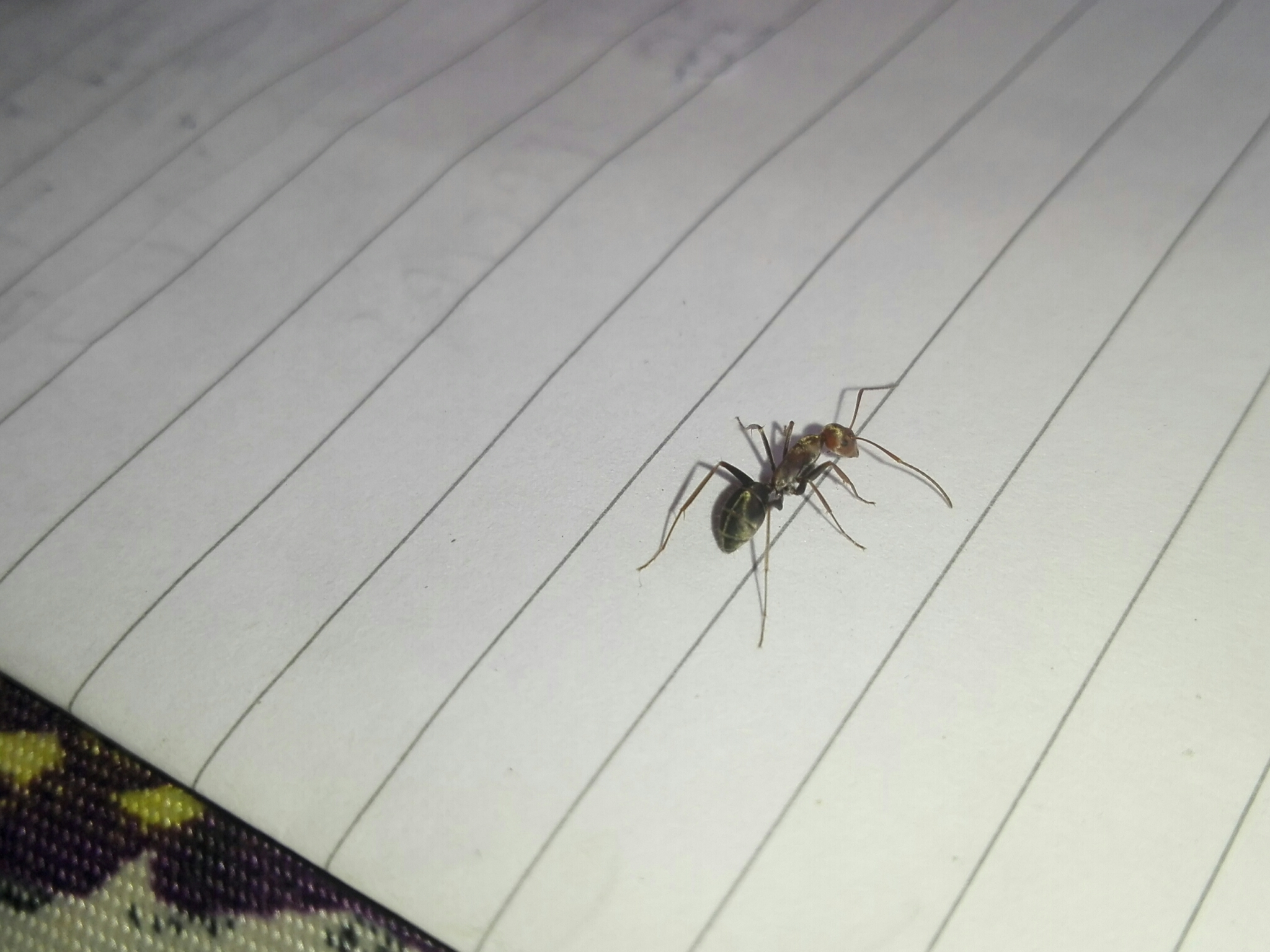
Right dorsal view
