= Hypoponera confinis =

Scientific classification
- Kingdom: Animalia
- Phylum: Arthropoda
- Clade: Pancrustacea
- Class: Insecta
- Order: Hymenoptera
- Family: Formicidae
- Genus: Hypoponera
- Species: H. confinis

Binomial name
- Hypoponera confinis (Roger, 1860)

Synonyms
- Ponera convexiuscula nautarum Santschi, 1938

Species of ant

Hypoponera confinis is a species of ant of the subfamily Ponerinae, which can be found from Sri Lanka, and China.

== Subspecies ==
- Hypoponera confinis aitkenii Forel, 1900 - India
- Hypoponera confinis confinis Forel, 1900 - Marshall Islands, Micronesia, New Guinea, Philippines, Samoa, Solomon Islands, Tonga, Bangladesh, India, Sri Lanka, China
- Hypoponera confinis epinotalis Viehmeyer, 1916 - Singapore
- Hypoponera confinis javana Forel, 1905 - Borneo, Indonesia, Philippines
- Hypoponera confinis singaporensis Viehmeyer, 1916 - Singapore
- Hypoponera confinis wroughtonii Forel, 1900 - India
