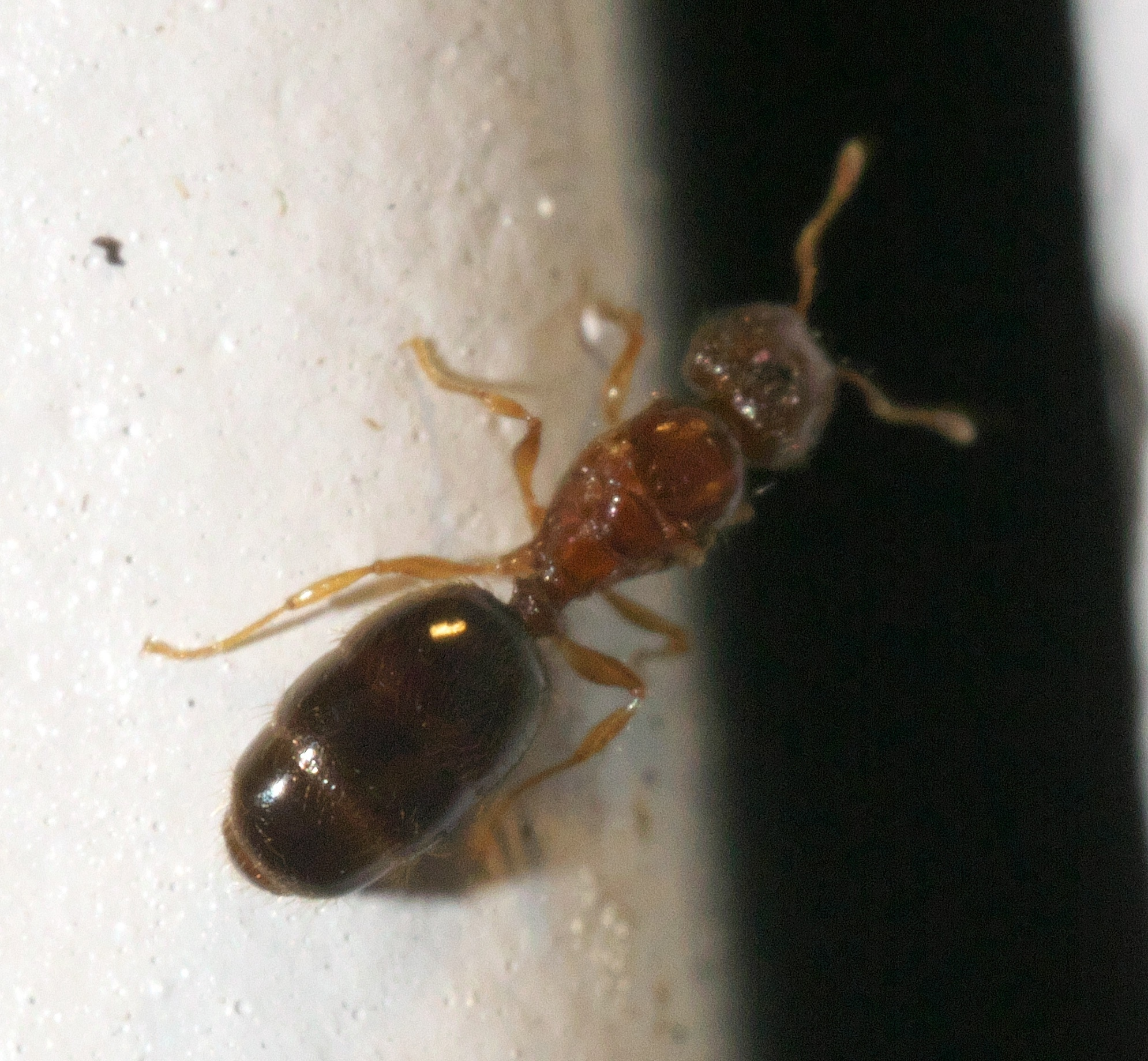
- Pheidole parva, Florida

Scientific classification
- Domain: Eukaryota
- Kingdom: Animalia
- Phylum: Arthropoda
- Class: Insecta
- Order: Hymenoptera
- Family: Formicidae
- Subfamily: Myrmicinae
- Genus: Pheidole
- Species: P. parva

Binomial name
- Pheidole parva Mayr, 1865

= Pheidole parva =

Species of ant

Pheidole parva is a species of ant in the subfamily Myrmicinae.

== Habitat and distribution ==
Pheidole parva is a widespread and probably invasive species in parts of the Old World and belongs to the P. rinae complex. Most likely it is an introduced species to the Malagasy region. Indeed, live ants of this species have recently been found travelling onboard different ships. Also its ubiquity in many different habitats and microhabitats on Mauritius and the Seychelles and its presence in ports there indicate that it is well-adapted to human environments and thus a likely candidate to invade new areas through human commerce. This tiny and relatively inconspicuous ant is very common in places and can be found in soil and leaf litter, under stones or root mats, in rotten logs, foraging on or nesting in the ground, as well as in lower vegetation and even under the bark of live trees. It was collected in a variety of different habitats, from parks and gardens, to mangrove and coastal scrub, to degraded dry forest, littoral and mixed forest, and rainforest, in elevations between 1 and 445 m. It has also been found on the Arabian Peninsula in Saudi Arabia and in the United Arab Emirates, on farms mostly inland from the coast at elevations of 675 and 735 m. As the nests were also found under potted plants, it is very likely that P. parva has been introduced to the Arabian Peninsula by human commerce.

== Description ==
On the smaller islands of the Southwest Indian Ocean, P. parva can be superficially confused with P. jonas, especially because the minors are relatively similar in their morphologies. The main characters distinguishing both worker castes of these two species are: the relative length of the postpetiole in both castes; the scapes of the workers of P. parva are distinctly shorter than those of P. jonas; and the heads of majors are distinctly longer than wide in P. parva, versus on average as long as wide in P. jonas.
