= Crematogaster binghamii =

Scientific classification
- Domain: Eukaryota
- Kingdom: Animalia
- Phylum: Arthropoda
- Class: Insecta
- Order: Hymenoptera
- Family: Formicidae
- Subfamily: Myrmicinae
- Genus: Crematogaster
- Species: C. binghamii

Binomial name
- Crematogaster binghamii Forel, 1904

Species of ant

Crematogaster binghamii is a species of ant in tribe Crematogastrini. It was described by Forel in 1904.
