= Dorylus orientalis =

Scientific classification
- Kingdom: Animalia
- Phylum: Arthropoda
- Clade: Pancrustacea
- Class: Insecta
- Order: Hymenoptera
- Family: Formicidae
- Genus: Dorylus
- Species: D. orientalis

Binomial name
- Dorylus orientalis Westwood, 1835

Synonyms
- Alaopone oberthueri Emery, 1881; Dorylus fuscus Emery, 1889; Dorylus longicornis Shuckard, 1840; Labidus curtisii Shuckard, 1840

Species of ant

Dorylus orientalis is an Asian species of army ants in the genus Dorylus. It can be found in Bangladesh, India, Myanmar, Nepal, Sri Lanka, Thailand, Vietnam, China, and Borneo.

Dorylus orientalis have two morphologically distinct series of workers that has not been known previously among army ants.

== Subspecies ==
- Dorylus orientalis obscuriceps Santschi, 1920
- Dorylus orientalis orientalis Westwood, 1835
