= Pheidole spathifera =

Scientific classification
- Kingdom: Animalia
- Phylum: Arthropoda
- Clade: Pancrustacea
- Class: Insecta
- Order: Hymenoptera
- Family: Formicidae
- Subfamily: Myrmicinae
- Genus: Pheidole
- Species: P. spathifera

Binomial name
- Pheidole spathifera Forel, 1902

Species of ant

Pheidole spathifera is a species of ant in the subfamily Myrmicinae. It is found in Asian countries.

== Subspecies ==
- Pheidole spathifera aspatha Forel, 1902 - India
- Pheidole spathifera spathifera Forel, 1902 - Bangladesh, India, Thailand, China
- Pheidole spathifera yerburyi Forel, 1902 - Myanmar, Sri Lanka
