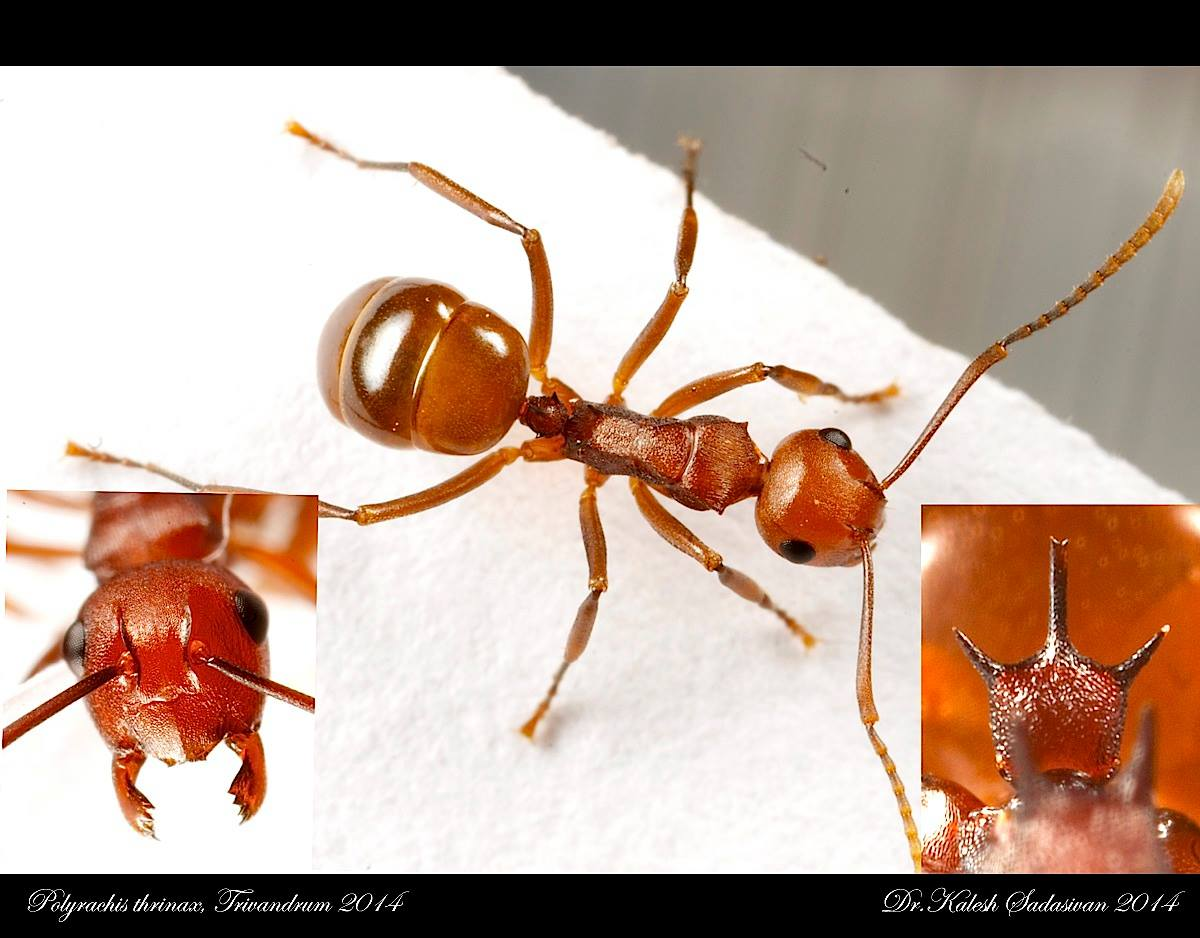

Scientific classification
- Kingdom: Animalia
- Phylum: Arthropoda
- Clade: Pancrustacea
- Class: Insecta
- Order: Hymenoptera
- Family: Formicidae
- Subfamily: Formicinae
- Genus: Polyrhachis
- Subgenus: Myrmothrinax
- Species: P. thrinax

Binomial name
- Polyrhachis thrinax Roger, 1863

Synonyms
- Polyrhachis thrinax mucronis Donisthorpe, 1942

= Polyrhachis thrinax =

Species of ant

Polyrhachis thrinax is a species of ant in the subfamily Formicinae, found in many Asian countries. There are 6 or 7 subspecies recognized.

== Subspecies ==
- Polyrhachis thrinax castanea Stitz, 1925 – Philippines
- Polyrhachis thrinax inconstans Viehmeyer, 1916 – Singapore
- Polyrhachis thrinax lancearia Forel, 1893 – India
- Polyrhachis thrinax lucida Emery, 1894 – Malaysia
- Polyrhachis thrinax overbecki Dorow, 1995 – Philippines, Singapore
- Polyrhachis thrinax thrinax Roger, 1863 – Philippines, Bangladesh, India, Sri Lanka, Thailand, China

=== * Possible subspecies ===
- Polyrhachis thrinax nigripes Viehmeyer, 1916
