= Camponotus mendax =

Scientific classification
- Kingdom: Animalia
- Phylum: Arthropoda
- Clade: Pancrustacea
- Class: Insecta
- Order: Hymenoptera
- Family: Formicidae
- Subfamily: Formicinae
- Genus: Camponotus
- Subgenus: Orthonotomyrmex
- Species: C. mendax

Binomial name
- Camponotus mendax (Fabricius, 1782)

Subspecies
- 2. See text

Synonyms
- Camponotus pseudolus Forel, 1902

Species of ant

Camponotus mendax is a species of carpenter ant (genus Camponotus). It is found from India, and Sri Lanka, where the two subspecies are geographically separated.

== Subspecies ==
- Camponotus mendax integer Forel, 1895 - Sri Lanka
- Camponotus mendax mendax Forel, 1895 - India
