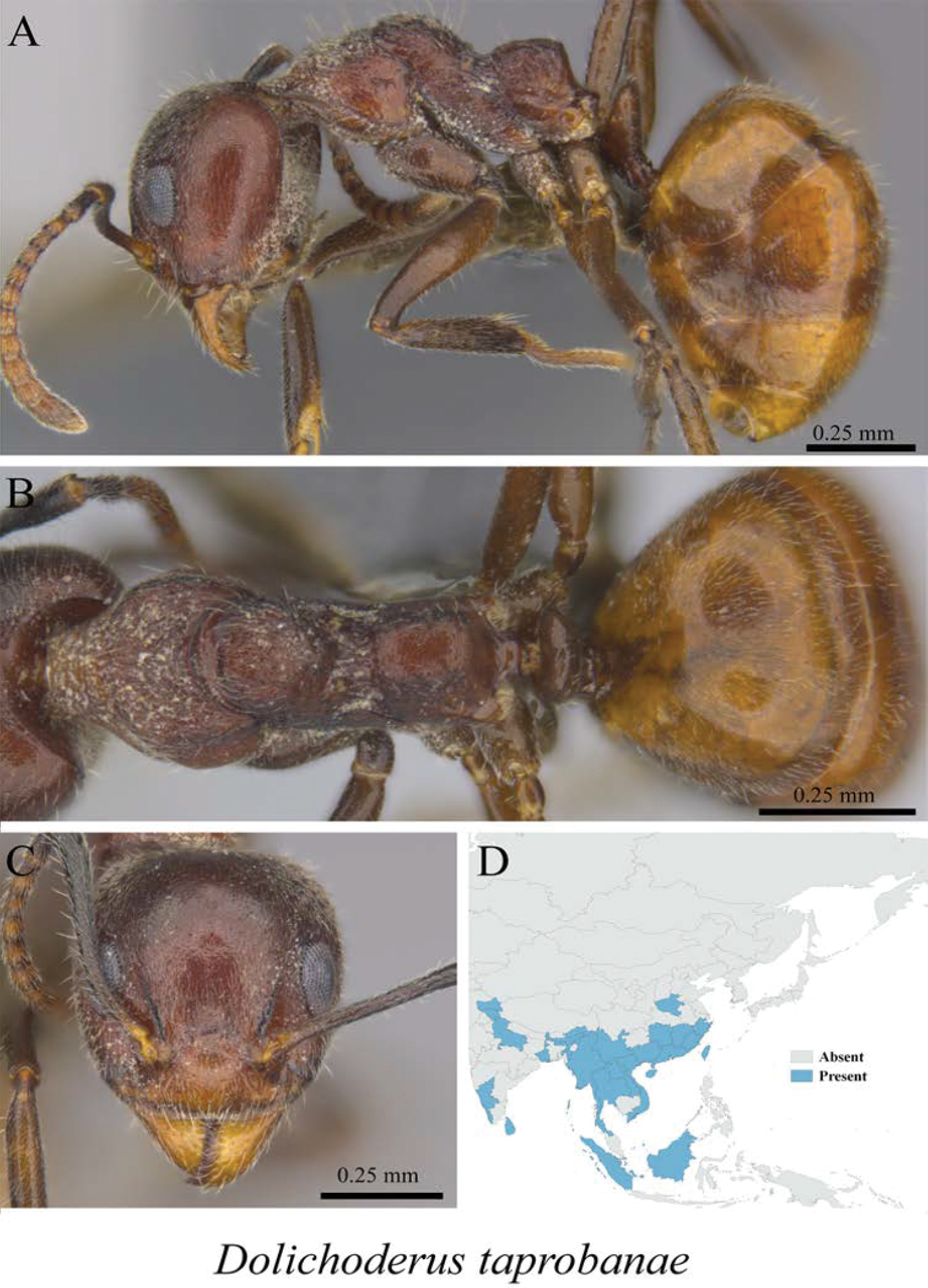

Scientific classification
- Domain: Eukaryota
- Kingdom: Animalia
- Phylum: Arthropoda
- Class: Insecta
- Order: Hymenoptera
- Family: Formicidae
- Subfamily: Dolichoderinae
- Genus: Dolichoderus
- Species: D. taprobanae

Binomial name
- Dolichoderus taprobanae (Smith, F., 1858)

Subspecies
- Dolichoderus taprobanae borneensis Forel, 1911; Dolichoderus taprobanae ceramensis Stitz, 1912; Dolichoderus taprobanae friedrichsi Forel, 1914; Dolichoderus taprobanae gracilipes Mayr, 1879; Dolichoderus taprobanae siamensis Forel, 1911

Synonyms
- Dolichoderus semirufus André, 1887; Dolichoderus taprobanae obscuripes Santschi, 1920; Dolichoderus taprobanae tonkina Santschi, 1920; Formica ingruens Walker, 1859; Hypoclinea gracilis Motschoulsky, 1863

= Dolichoderus taprobanae =

Species of ant

Dolichoderus taprobanae is a species of ant in the genus Dolichoderus. Described by Smith in 1858, the species is endemic to Asia.
