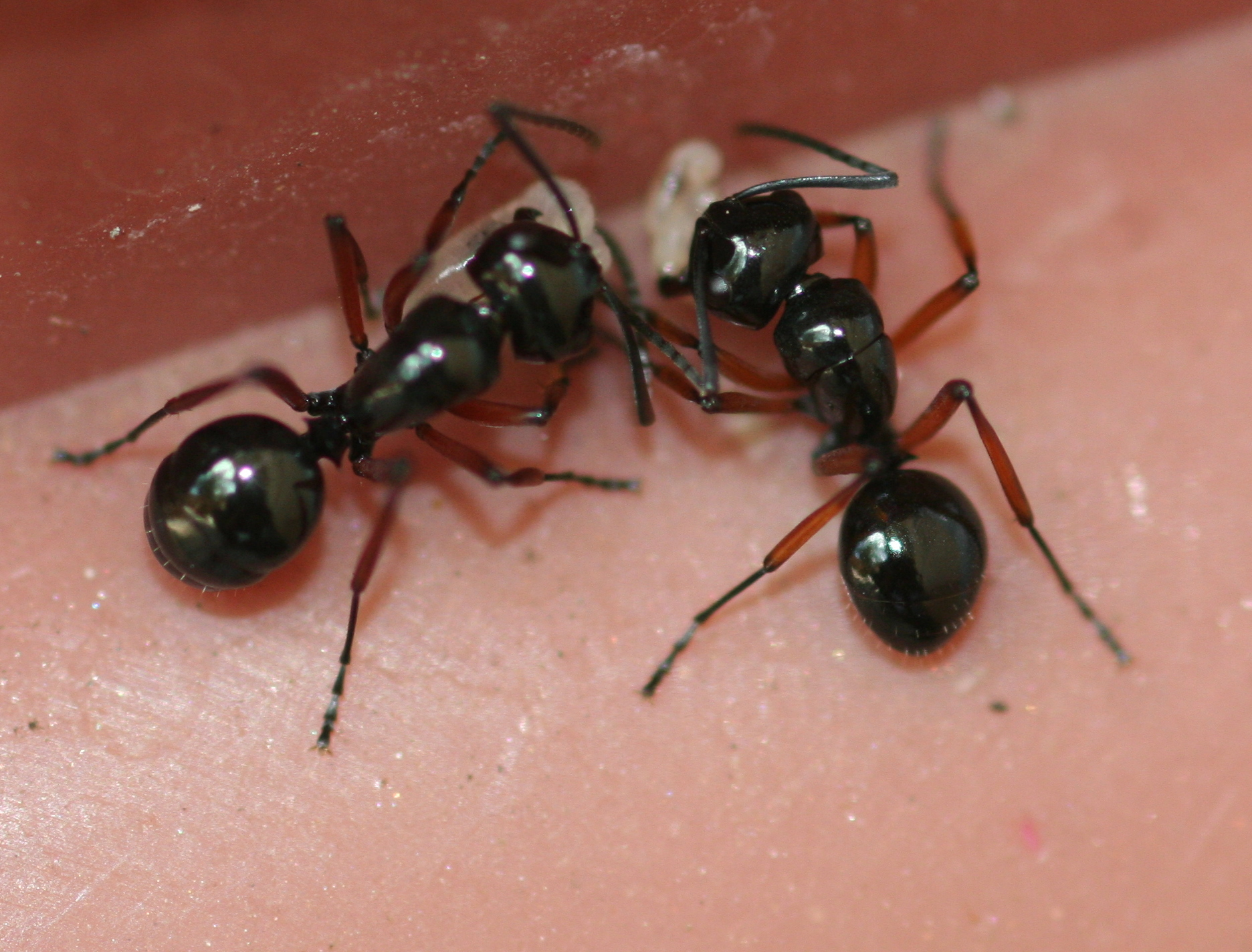

Scientific classification
- Kingdom: Animalia
- Phylum: Arthropoda
- Clade: Pancrustacea
- Class: Insecta
- Order: Hymenoptera
- Family: Formicidae
- Subfamily: Formicinae
- Genus: Polyrhachis
- Subgenus: Cyrtomyrma
- Species: P. rastellata

Binomial name
- Polyrhachis rastellata (Latreille, 1802)

Synonyms
- Polyrhachis rastellata ceylonensis Donisthorpe, 1938

= Polyrhachis rastellata =

Species of ant

Polyrhachis rastellata is a species of ant in the subfamily Formicinae, found in few Asian countries. Two subspecies are recognized. Some texts include many more subspecies ranks. but it is debatable about these ranks. The following ten subspecies are according to Integrated Taxonomic Information System

== Subspecies ==
- Polyrhachis rastellata baduri Donisthorpe, 1941
- Polyrhachis rastellata celebensis Viehmeyer, 1913
- Polyrhachis rastellata ceylonensis Donisthorpe, 1938
- Polyrhachis rastellata congener Santschi, 1928
- Polyrhachis rastellata corporaali Santschi, 1928
- Polyrhachis rastellata fulakora Mann, 1919
- Polyrhachis rastellata nomo Donisthorpe, 1941
- Polyrhachis rastellata pagana Santschi, 1928
- Polyrhachis rastellata rastellata (Latreille, 1802)
- Polyrhachis rastellata semiinermis Donisthorpe, 1941
