= Dolichoderus affinis =

Scientific classification
- Domain: Eukaryota
- Kingdom: Animalia
- Phylum: Arthropoda
- Class: Insecta
- Order: Hymenoptera
- Family: Formicidae
- Subfamily: Dolichoderinae
- Genus: Dolichoderus
- Species: D. affinis

Binomial name
- Dolichoderus affinis Emery, 1889

Subspecies
- Dolichoderus affinis glabripes Forel, 1895; Dolichoderus affinis mus Santschi, 1920

Synonyms
- Dolichoderus affinis nigricans Emery, 1895

Species of ant

Dolichoderus affinis is a species of ant in the genus Dolichoderus. Described by Emery in 1889, the species is endemic to various countries of Asia.
