= Diacamma ceylonense =

Scientific classification
- Kingdom: Animalia
- Phylum: Arthropoda
- Clade: Pancrustacea
- Class: Insecta
- Order: Hymenoptera
- Family: Formicidae
- Genus: Diacamma
- Species: D. ceylonense

Binomial name
- Diacamma ceylonense Emery, 1897

Species of ant

Diacamma ceylonense, also known as Sri Lanka queenless ant, is a species of ant of the subfamily Ponerinae. It is a widespread species.

== Subspecies ==
- Diacamma ceylonense ceylonense Santschi, 1932 - India, Sri Lanka
- Diacamma ceylonense orbiculatum Emery, 1897 - Laos
