= Pheidole sulcaticeps =

Scientific classification
- Kingdom: Animalia
- Phylum: Arthropoda
- Clade: Pancrustacea
- Class: Insecta
- Order: Hymenoptera
- Family: Formicidae
- Subfamily: Myrmicinae
- Genus: Pheidole
- Species: P. sulcaticeps

Binomial name
- Pheidole sulcaticeps Roger, 1863

Species of ant

Pheidole sulcaticeps is a species of ant in the subfamily Myrmicinae.

== Subspecies ==
- Pheidole sulcaticeps punensis Forel, 1902 - India
- Pheidole sulcaticeps sulcaticeps Forel, 1902 - Bangladesh, Sri Lanka, China
- Pheidole sulcaticeps yeensis Forel, 1902
- Pheidole sulcaticeps vellicans Forel, 1911 - Sri Lanka
