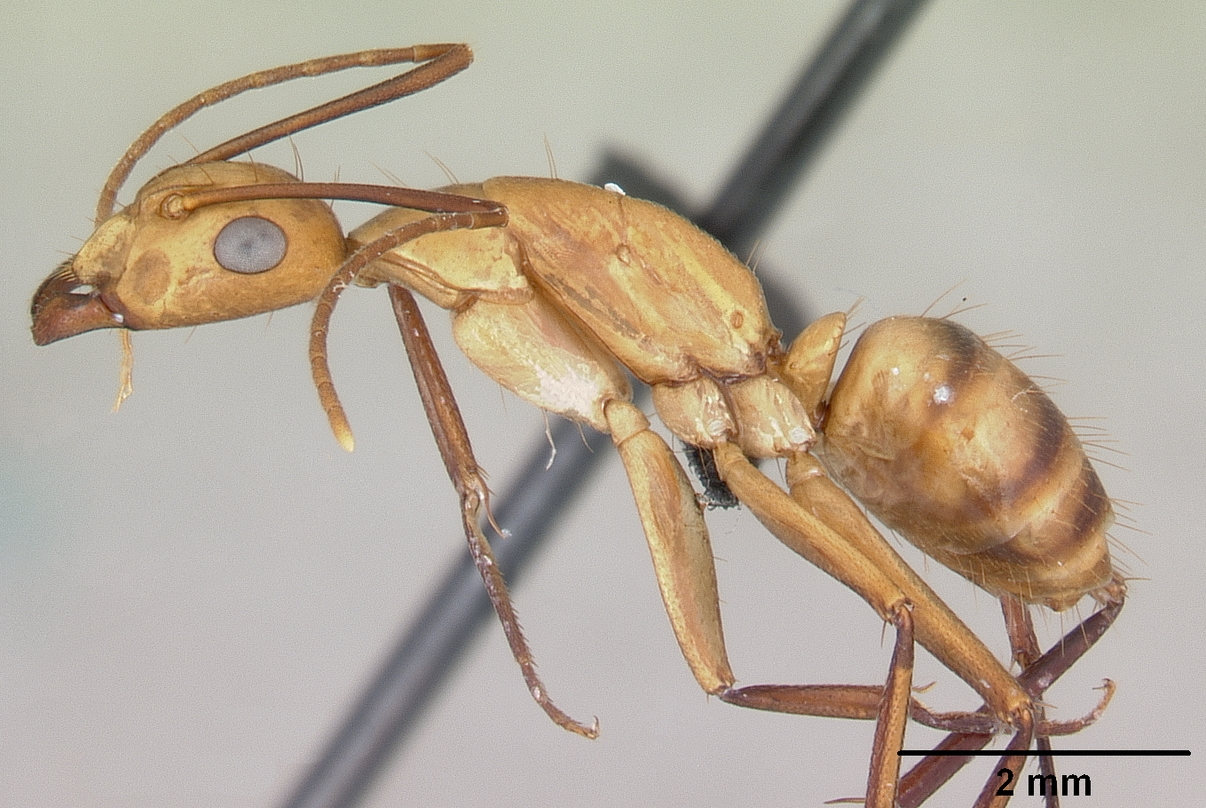
- C. variegatus worker

Scientific classification
- Kingdom: Animalia
- Phylum: Arthropoda
- Clade: Pancrustacea
- Class: Insecta
- Order: Hymenoptera
- Family: Formicidae
- Subfamily: Formicinae
- Genus: Camponotus
- Subgenus: Tanaemyrmex
- Species: C. variegatus

Binomial name
- Camponotus variegatus (Smith, F., 1858)

Subspecies
- 15. See text

Synonyms
- Camponotus variegatus hawaiensis Emery, 1920

= Camponotus variegatus =

Species of carpenter ant

Camponotus variegatus is a species of carpenter ant (genus Camponotus).

== Diet ==
They will eat small insects, honeydew, and most common pantry foods.

== Subspecies ==
- Camponotus variegatus ambonensis Karavaiev, 1930 - Indonesia
- Camponotus variegatus bacchus Smith, F., 1858 - Sri Lanka
- Camponotus variegatus batta Menozzi, 1930 - Indonesia
- Camponotus variegatus cleon Forel, 1913 - Indonesia
- Camponotus variegatus comottoi Emery, 1887 - Myanmar
- Camponotus variegatus crassinodis Forel, 1892 - Philippines, Myanmar
- Camponotus variegatus dulcis Dalla Torre, 1893 - China, Myanmar, Philippines.
- Camponotus variegatus flavotestaceus Donisthorpe, 1948 - New Guinea
- Camponotus variegatus fuscithorax Dalla Torre, 1893 - India
- Camponotus variegatus infuscus Forel, 1892 - India
- Camponotus variegatus intrans Forel, 1911 - Sri Lanka
- Camponotus variegatus proles Emery, 1925 - Laos
- Camponotus variegatus somnificus Forel, 1902 - India
- Camponotus variegatus stenonotus Stitz, 1938 - Borneo
- Camponotus variegatus variegatus Smith, F., 1858 - Hawaii, Micronesia, Bangladesh, China, Turkey
