= Crematogaster ransonneti =

Scientific classification
- Kingdom: Animalia
- Phylum: Arthropoda
- Clade: Pancrustacea
- Class: Insecta
- Order: Hymenoptera
- Family: Formicidae
- Subfamily: Myrmicinae
- Genus: Crematogaster
- Species: C. ransonneti

Binomial name
- Crematogaster ransonneti Mayr, 1868

Species of ant

Crematogaster ransonneti is a species of ant of the subfamily Myrmicinae. It can be found in Sri Lanka and India.
