= Pheidole latinoda =

Scientific classification
- Kingdom: Animalia
- Phylum: Arthropoda
- Clade: Pancrustacea
- Class: Insecta
- Order: Hymenoptera
- Family: Formicidae
- Subfamily: Myrmicinae
- Genus: Pheidole
- Species: P. latinoda

Binomial name
- Pheidole latinoda Roger, 1863

Species of ant

Pheidole latinoda is a species of ant in the subfamily Myrmicinae. It is found in India and Sri Lanka.

== Subspecies ==
- Pheidole latinoda angustior Forel, 1902 - India, Sri Lanka
- Pheidole latinoda latinoda Roger, 1863 - Sri Lanka
- Pheidole latinoda major Forel, 1885 - India
- Pheidole latinoda peradeniyae Forel, 1911 - Sri Lanka
