= Crematogaster betapicalis =

Scientific classification
- Domain: Eukaryota
- Kingdom: Animalia
- Phylum: Arthropoda
- Class: Insecta
- Order: Hymenoptera
- Family: Formicidae
- Subfamily: Myrmicinae
- Genus: Crematogaster
- Species: C. betapicalis

Binomial name
- Crematogaster betapicalis Smith, 1995

Species of ant

Crematogaster betapicalis is a species of ant in tribe Crematogastrini. It was described by Smith in 1995.
