= Camponotus reticulatus =

Scientific classification
- Kingdom: Animalia
- Phylum: Arthropoda
- Clade: Pancrustacea
- Class: Insecta
- Order: Hymenoptera
- Family: Formicidae
- Subfamily: Formicinae
- Genus: Camponotus
- Subgenus: Myrmamblys
- Species: C. reticulatus

Binomial name
- Camponotus reticulatus Roger, 1863

Subspecies
- 8. See text

Synonyms
- Camponotus redtenbacheri Mayr, 1862

Species of ant

Camponotus reticulatus is a species of carpenter ant (genus Camponotus). It is found from many Afrotropical, Indo-Australian, Oriental, Palaearctic regional countries and in Singapore.

== Subspecies ==
- Camponotus reticulatus fullawayi Wheeler, W.M., 1912 - Guam
- Camponotus reticulatus gestiens Forel, 1915 - Indonesia
- Camponotus reticulatus imparilis Forel, 1915 - Indonesia
- Camponotus reticulatus jagori Stitz, 1925 - Philippines
- Camponotus reticulatus latitans Forel, 1893 - India
- Camponotus reticulatus reticulatus Roger, 1863 - India
- Camponotus reticulatus sericellus Viehmeyer, 1916 - Singapore
- Camponotus reticulatus yerburyi Forel, 1893 - Sri Lanka
