= Polyrhachis exercita =

Scientific classification
- Kingdom: Animalia
- Phylum: Arthropoda
- Clade: Pancrustacea
- Class: Insecta
- Order: Hymenoptera
- Family: Formicidae
- Subfamily: Formicinae
- Genus: Polyrhachis
- Subgenus: Campomyrma
- Species: P. exercita

Binomial name
- Polyrhachis exercita (Walker, 1859)

Species of ant

Polyrhachis exercita is a species of ant in the subfamily Formicinae, found in India, Sri Lanka, and Bangladesh.

== Subspecies ==
- Polyrhachis exercita exercita (Walker, 1859)
- Polyrhachis exercita lucidiventris Forel, 1907
- Polyrhachis exercita obtusisquama Forel, 1902
- Polyrhachis exercita rastrata Emery, 1889
