= Camponotus irritans =

Scientific classification
- Kingdom: Animalia
- Phylum: Arthropoda
- Clade: Pancrustacea
- Class: Insecta
- Order: Hymenoptera
- Family: Formicidae
- Subfamily: Formicinae
- Genus: Camponotus
- Subgenus: Tanaemyrmex
- Species: C. irritans

Binomial name
- Camponotus irritans (Smith, F., 1857)

Subspecies
- 15. See text

Synonyms
- Camponotus agnatus Roger, 1863

Species of ant

Camponotus irritans is a species of carpenter ant (genus Camponotus). It is found in many Asian and Oceanian countries. They live mainly in open forest margins, grasslands, and lowland dipterocarp forests. This species is found mostly in man-made infrastructure, such as outdoor electrical junction boxes, and in urban settings. They have a high tolerance for high heat, up to 50 degrees Celsius. They feed on plant nectar, nectar secretions, and small insects.

== Subspecies ==
- Camponotus irritans carensis Emery, 1920 - Nicobar Islands
- Camponotus irritans carinifer Viehmeyer, 1916 - Singapore
- Camponotus irritans cliens Forel, 1911 - Indonesia
- Camponotus irritans croceomaculatus Emery, 1914 - New Caledonia
- Camponotus irritans curtus Emery, 1900 - Indonesia
- Camponotus irritans fatuus Forel, 1886 - Indonesia
- Camponotus irritans hongkongensis Forel, 1912 - China
- Camponotus irritans inferior Emery, 1925 - Borneo
- Camponotus irritans irritans Smith, F., 1857 - Malaysia, Sri Lanka
- Camponotus irritans kubaryi Mayr, 1876 - Palau
- Camponotus irritans melanogaster Stitz, 1938 - Micronesia
- Camponotus irritans pallidus Smith, F., 1857 - Borneo, Bangladesh, Philippines
- Camponotus irritans procax Santschi, 1919 - Vietnam
- Camponotus irritans sumatranus Özdikmen, 2010 - Indonesia
- Camponotus irritans tinctus Smith, F., 1858 - Myanmar
