= Polyrhachis punctillata =

Scientific classification
- Kingdom: Animalia
- Phylum: Arthropoda
- Clade: Pancrustacea
- Class: Insecta
- Order: Hymenoptera
- Family: Formicidae
- Subfamily: Formicinae
- Genus: Polyrhachis
- Subgenus: Myrma
- Species: P. punctillata

Binomial name
- Polyrhachis punctillata Roger, 1863

Species of ant

Polyrhachis punctillata is a species of ant in the subfamily Formicinae, found in few Asian countries. Three subspecies are recognized.

== Subspecies ==
- Polyrhachis punctillata fergusoni Forel, 1902 – India
- Polyrhachis punctillata punctillata Roger, 1863 – Sri Lanka, China
- Polyrhachis punctillata smythiesii Forel, 1895 – India
