= Pheidole nodus =

Scientific classification
- Kingdom: Animalia
- Phylum: Arthropoda
- Clade: Pancrustacea
- Class: Insecta
- Order: Hymenoptera
- Family: Formicidae
- Subfamily: Myrmicinae
- Genus: Pheidole
- Species: P. nodus

Binomial name
- Pheidole nodus Smith, F., 1874

Synonyms
- Pheidole nodus flebilis Santschi, 1937; Pheidole nodus praevexata Wheeler, W.M., 1929; Pheidole rhombinoda Mayr, 1879; Pheidole rhombinoda formosensis Forel, 1913; Pheidole rhombinoda micantiventris Mayr, 1897; Pheidole rhombinoda stella Forel, 1911; Pheidole rhombinoda taprobanae Forel, 1902; Pheidole treubi Forel, 1905

Species of ant

Pheidole nodus is a species of ant in the subfamily Myrmicinae. It is found in Indonesia, Bangladesh, India, Taiwan, Thailand, Vietnam, Sri Lanka, Japan and South Korea.
