= Camponotus thraso =

Scientific classification
- Kingdom: Animalia
- Phylum: Arthropoda
- Clade: Pancrustacea
- Class: Insecta
- Order: Hymenoptera
- Family: Formicidae
- Subfamily: Formicinae
- Genus: Camponotus
- Subgenus: Tanaemyrmex
- Species: C. thraso

Binomial name
- Camponotus thraso Forel, 1893

Subspecies
- 7. See text

Species of ant

Camponotus thraso is a species of carpenter ant (genus Camponotus). The type species is found from Sri Lanka.

== Subspecies ==
- Camponotus thraso agricola Forel, 1910 - South Africa
- Camponotus thraso assabensis Emery, 1925 - Ethiopia
- Camponotus thraso diogenes Forel, 1909 - Sri Lanka
- Camponotus thraso montinanus Santschi, 1926 - Zimbabwe
- Camponotus thraso nefasitensis Menozzi, 1931 - Ethiopia
- Camponotus thraso negus Forel, 1907 - Kenya, Zimbabwe, Ethiopia
- Camponotus thraso thraso Forel, 1903 - Sri Lanka
