= Camponotus barbatus =

Scientific classification
- Kingdom: Animalia
- Phylum: Arthropoda
- Clade: Pancrustacea
- Class: Insecta
- Order: Hymenoptera
- Family: Formicidae
- Subfamily: Formicinae
- Genus: Camponotus
- Species: C. barbatus

Binomial name
- Camponotus barbatus Roger, 1863

Subspecies
- 4 subspecies. see text

Species of ant

Camponotus barbatus is a species of carpenter ant (genus Camponotus).

== Subspecies ==
- Camponotus barbatus barbatus Roger, 1863 - India
- Camponotus barbatus infuscoides Bingham, 1903 - Sri Lanka
- Camponotus barbatus samarus Santschi, 1932 - Borneo
- Camponotus barbatus taylori Forel, 1892 - China, Bangladesh, India
