= Crematogaster abdominalis =

Scientific classification
- Domain: Eukaryota
- Kingdom: Animalia
- Phylum: Arthropoda
- Class: Insecta
- Order: Hymenoptera
- Family: Formicidae
- Subfamily: Myrmicinae
- Genus: Crematogaster
- Species: C. abdominalis

Binomial name
- Crematogaster abdominalis Motschoulsky, 1863

Species of ant

Crematogaster abdominalis is a species of ant in tribe Crematogastrini. It was described by Motschoulsky in 1863.
