= Gnamptogenys coxalis =

Scientific classification
- Kingdom: Animalia
- Phylum: Arthropoda
- Clade: Pancrustacea
- Class: Insecta
- Order: Hymenoptera
- Family: Formicidae
- Genus: Gnamptogenys
- Species: G. coxalis

Binomial name
- Gnamptogenys coxalis (Roger, 1860)

Species of ant

Gnamptogenys coxalis is a species of ant of the subfamily Ectatomminae, which can be found from Borneo, Sri Lanka, India, and Nicobar Islands.
