= Dolichoderus moggridgei =

Scientific classification
- Domain: Eukaryota
- Kingdom: Animalia
- Phylum: Arthropoda
- Class: Insecta
- Order: Hymenoptera
- Family: Formicidae
- Subfamily: Dolichoderinae
- Genus: Dolichoderus
- Species: D. moggridgei

Binomial name
- Dolichoderus moggridgei Forel, 1886

Subspecies
- Dolichoderus moggridgei bicolor Santschi, 1920; Dolichoderus moggridgei lugubris Santschi, 1920

Species of ant

Dolichoderus moggridgei is a species of ant in the genus Dolichoderus. Described by Auguste-Henri Forel in 1886, the species is endemic to Afghanistan, China and India.
