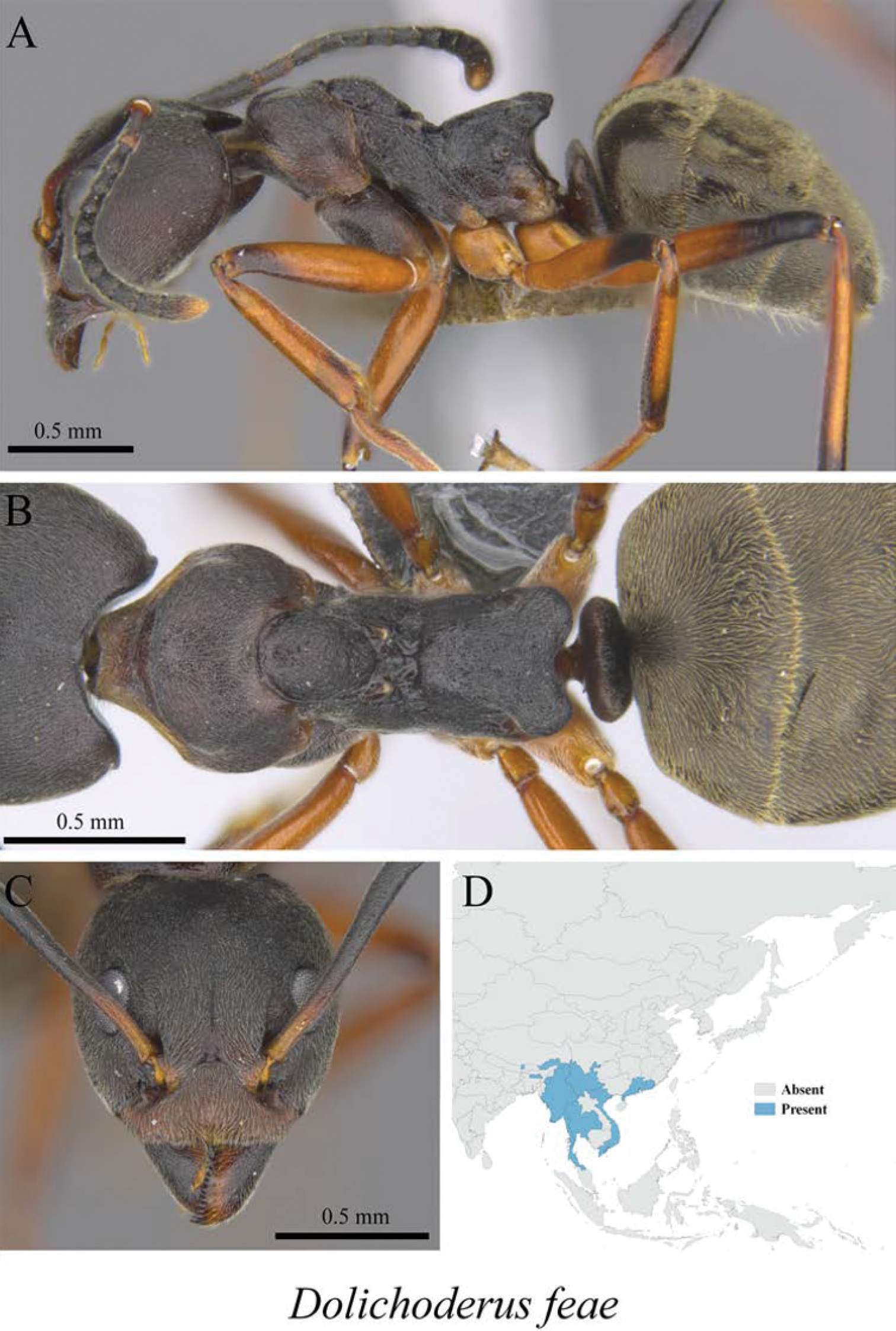

Scientific classification
- Domain: Eukaryota
- Kingdom: Animalia
- Phylum: Arthropoda
- Class: Insecta
- Order: Hymenoptera
- Family: Formicidae
- Subfamily: Dolichoderinae
- Genus: Dolichoderus
- Species: D. feae

Binomial name
- Dolichoderus feae Emery, 1889

Synonyms
- Dolichoderus feae caligatus Wheeler, W.M., 1927; Dolichoderus feae fuscus Emery, 1889

= Dolichoderus feae =

Species of ant

Dolichoderus feae is a species of ant in the genus Dolichoderus. Described by Carlo Emery in 1889, it is endemic to multiple countries, notably China, India, Myanmar (Burma) and Thailand.
