= Tapinoma luffae =

Scientific classification
- Domain: Eukaryota
- Kingdom: Animalia
- Phylum: Arthropoda
- Class: Insecta
- Order: Hymenoptera
- Family: Formicidae
- Subfamily: Dolichoderinae
- Genus: Tapinoma
- Species: T. luffae

Binomial name
- Tapinoma luffae (Kurian, 1955)

Species of ant

Tapinoma luffae is a species of ant in the genus Tapinoma. Described by Kurian in 1955, the species is endemic to Indonesia.
