= Crematogaster biroi =

Scientific classification
- Domain: Eukaryota
- Kingdom: Animalia
- Phylum: Arthropoda
- Class: Insecta
- Order: Hymenoptera
- Family: Formicidae
- Subfamily: Myrmicinae
- Genus: Crematogaster
- Species: C. biroi

Binomial name
- Crematogaster biroi Mayr, 1897

Species of ant

Crematogaster biroi is a species of ant in tribe Crematogastrini. It was described by Mayr in 1897.
