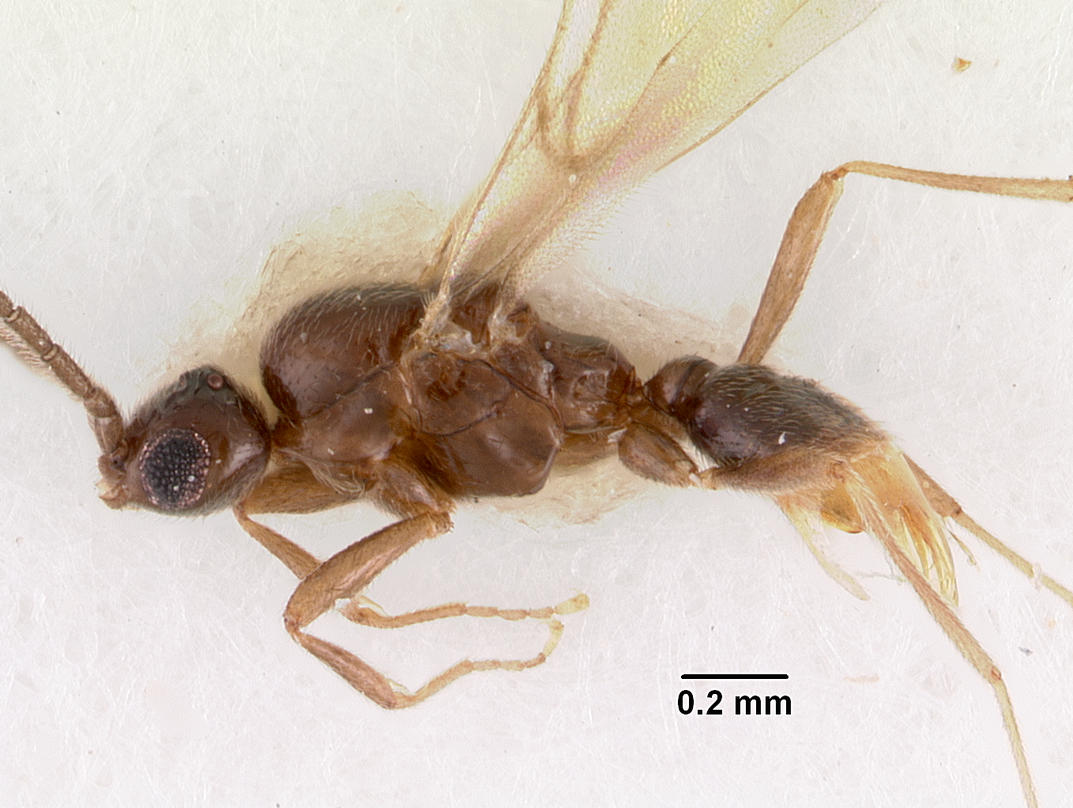
- Yavnella indica male

Scientific classification
- Domain: Eukaryota
- Kingdom: Animalia
- Phylum: Arthropoda
- Class: Insecta
- Order: Hymenoptera
- Family: Formicidae
- Genus: Yavnella
- Species: Y. indica

Binomial name
- Yavnella indica Kugler, J., 1987

= Yavnella indica =

Species of ant

Yavnella indica is a species of ant belonging to the Yavnella ant genus. The species was described by Kugler in 1987, it is one of the two species in its genus. It is native to India.
