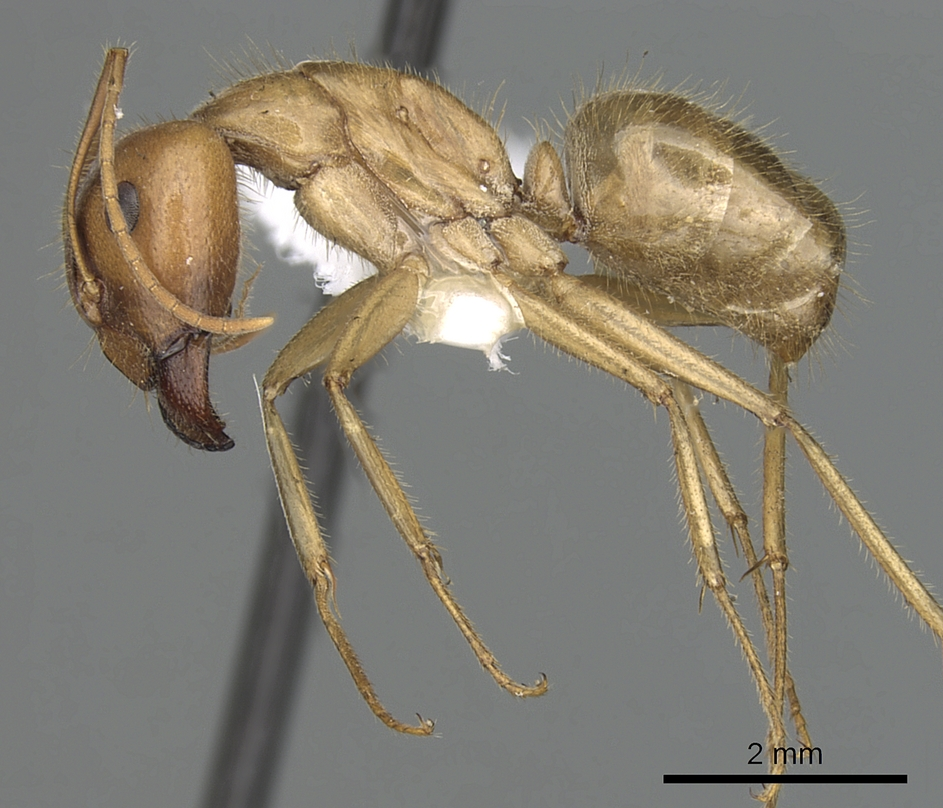

Scientific classification
- Kingdom: Animalia
- Phylum: Arthropoda
- Clade: Pancrustacea
- Class: Insecta
- Order: Hymenoptera
- Family: Formicidae
- Subfamily: Formicinae
- Genus: Camponotus
- Subgenus: Tanaemyrmex
- Species: C. buddhae

Binomial name
- Camponotus buddhae Forel, 1892

= Camponotus buddhae =

Species of ant

Camponotus buddhae is a species of carpenter ant (genus Camponotus) found in India, Iran, Kyrgyzstan, Russia, Turkey, and Turkmenistan.
