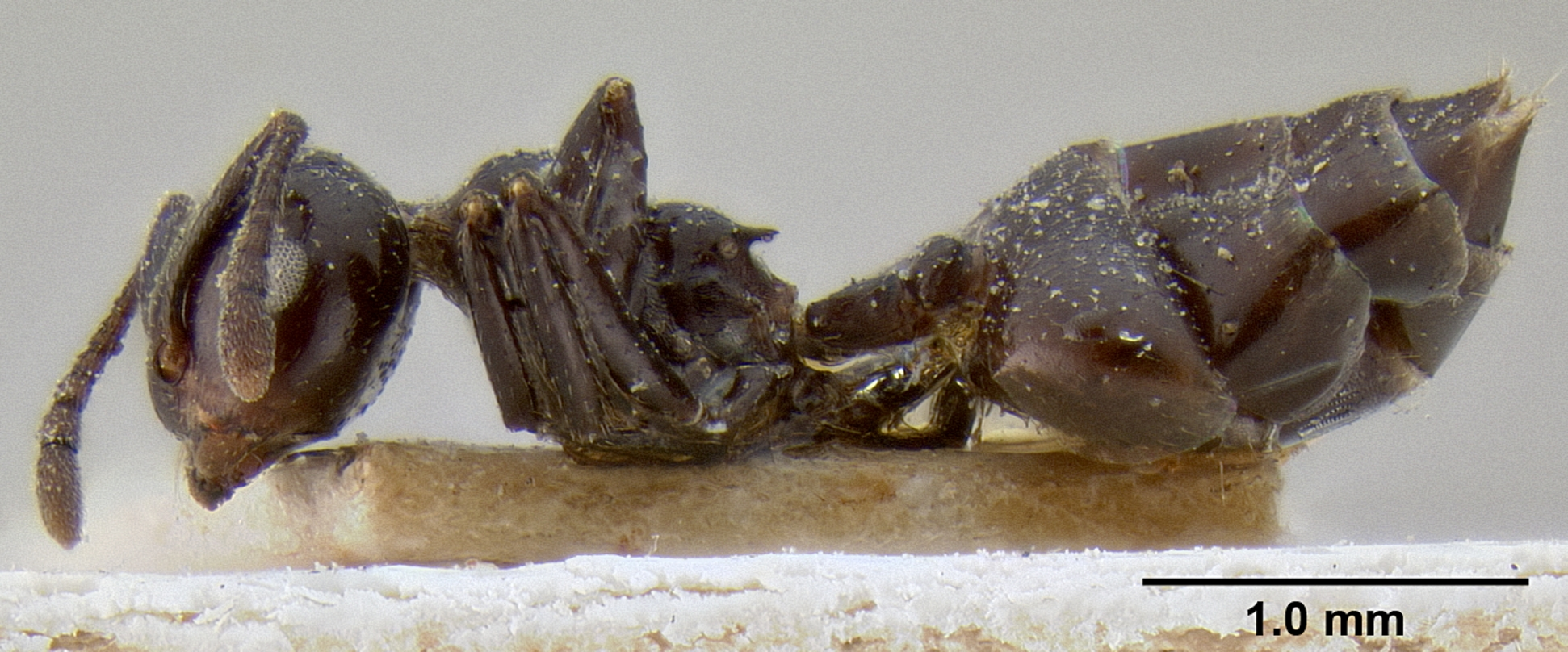
- Crematogaster aberrans

Scientific classification
- Kingdom: Animalia
- Phylum: Arthropoda
- Clade: Pancrustacea
- Class: Insecta
- Order: Hymenoptera
- Family: Formicidae
- Subfamily: Myrmicinae
- Genus: Crematogaster
- Species: C. aberrans

Binomial name
- Crematogaster aberrans Forel, 1892

= Crematogaster aberrans =

Species of ant

Crematogaster aberrans is a species of ant in tribe Crematogastrini. It was described by Forel in 1892.
