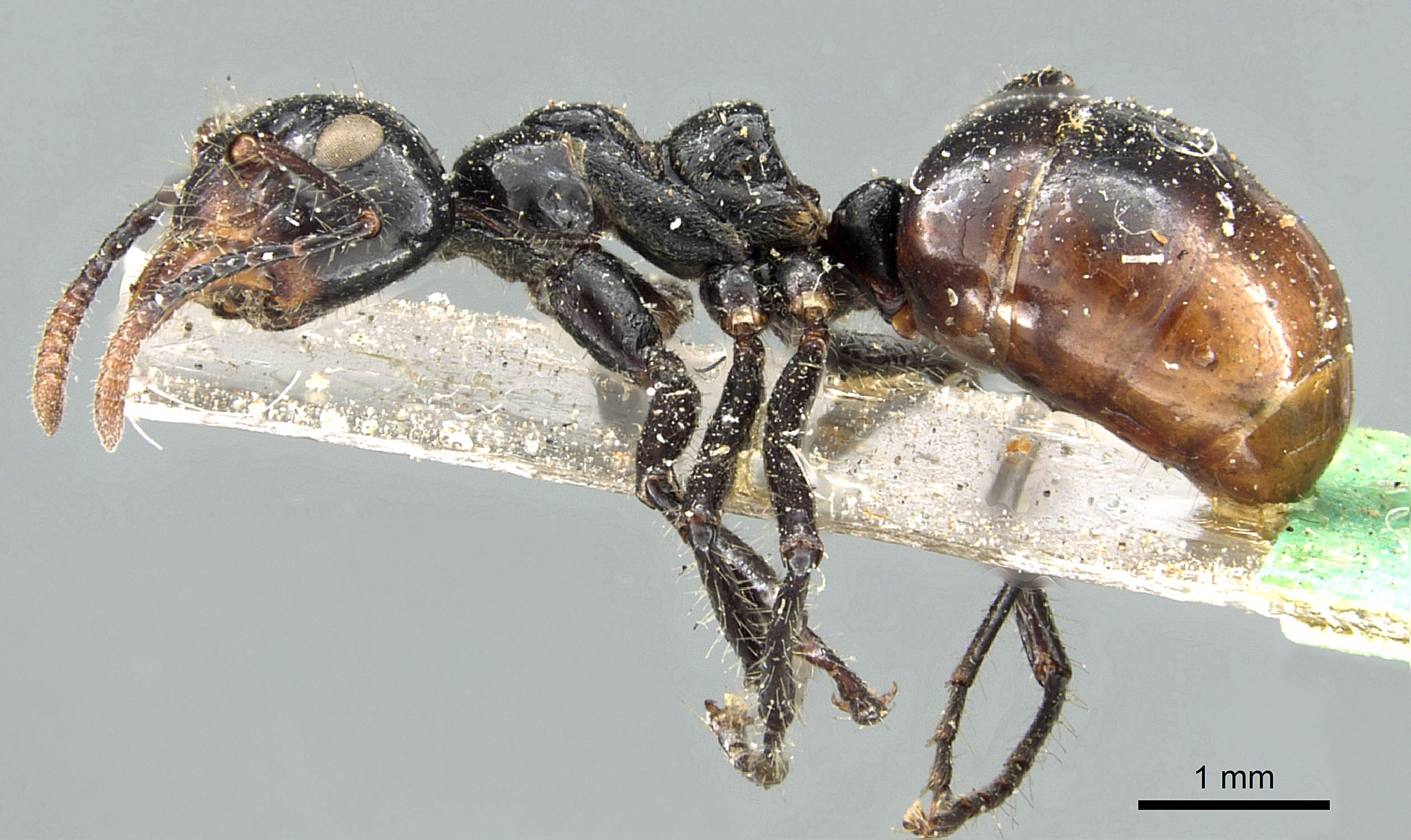

Scientific classification
- Domain: Eukaryota
- Kingdom: Animalia
- Phylum: Arthropoda
- Class: Insecta
- Order: Hymenoptera
- Family: Formicidae
- Subfamily: Dolichoderinae
- Genus: Dolichoderus
- Species: D. sulcaticeps

Binomial name
- Dolichoderus sulcaticeps (Mayr, 1870)

Synonyms
- Dolichoderus sulcaticeps nigriventris Santschi, 1920

= Dolichoderus sulcaticeps =

Species of ant

Dolichoderus sulcaticeps is a species of ant in the genus Dolichoderus. Described by Mayr in 1870, the species is endemic to Borneo, Indonesia, Malaysia, Thailand and Vietnam.

== Description ==
Dolichoderus sulcaticeps is a largely black ant with a smooth, or slightly reticulated, shiny body surface; the tip and hindermost part of the gaster are often yellowish or reddish.

== Ecology ==
This species forms large supercolonies with multiple queens. In Java, the nests are built on the ground or on rocks, but in other regions, such as peninsular Malaya and Singapore, large partial nests with many chambers are built in the treetops on the underside of leaves. Inside these, on the leaf surface, the ants tend scale insects and treehoppers as trophobionts; the hemipteran such sap from the leaves and the ants feed on the honeydew secreted. In other locations on the trees, carton structures, made of fibrous chewed plant material, are built to house the trophobionts. The ants actively collect their hemipterans guests, transporting them to the ant nests or to the protected free-feeding sites.

When alarmed, Dolichoderus sulcaticeps uses vibrations to communicate with other members of the colony. The vibrations are generated by a worker scraping its mandibles across the substrate and are interpreted by other worker ants according to their level of excitement; they either freeze, or they are emboldened to become more aggressive. Reproductives usually retreat into the safety of the nest.
