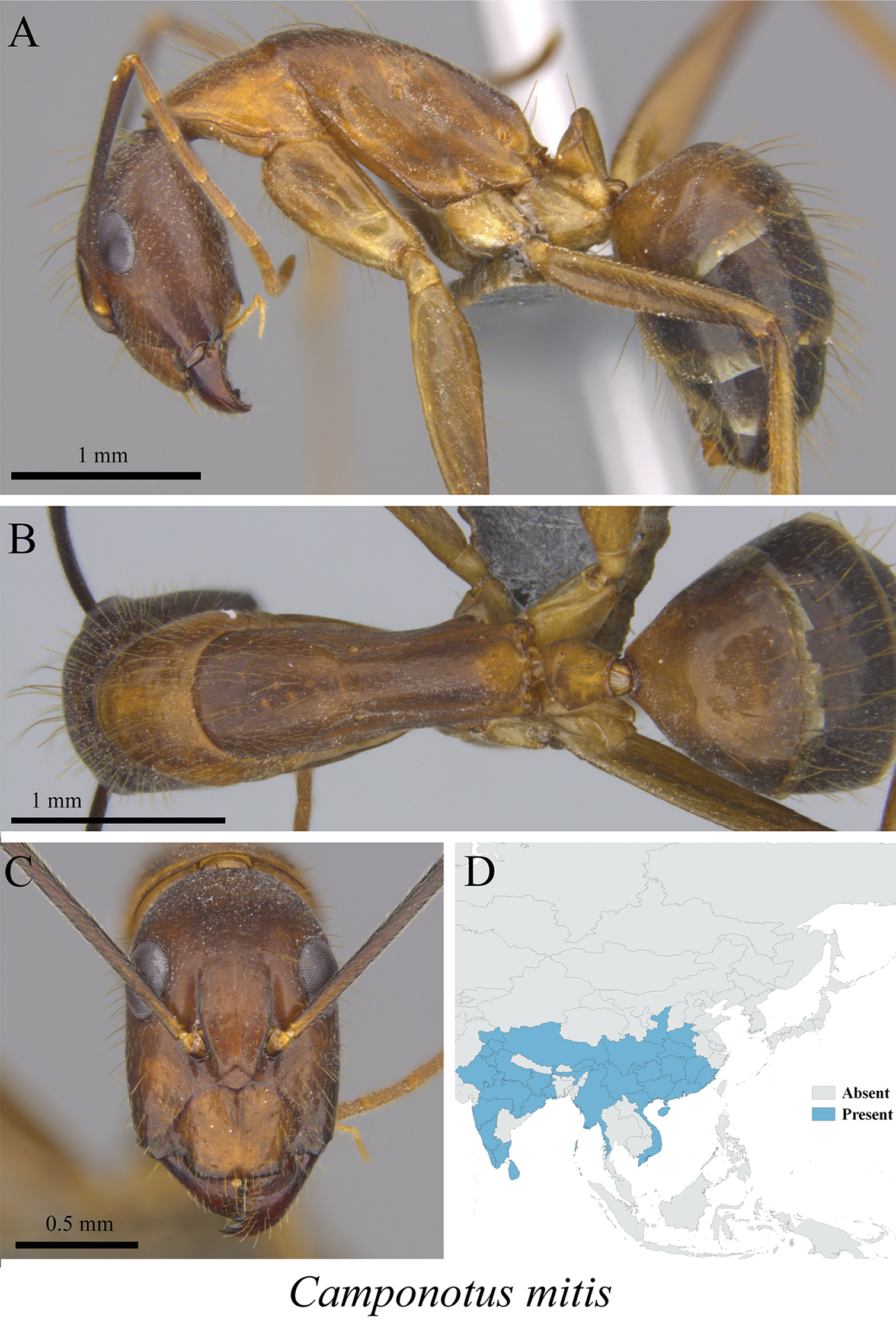

Scientific classification
- Kingdom: Animalia
- Phylum: Arthropoda
- Clade: Pancrustacea
- Class: Insecta
- Order: Hymenoptera
- Family: Formicidae
- Subfamily: Formicinae
- Genus: Camponotus
- Subgenus: Tanaemyrmex
- Species: C. mitis

Binomial name
- Camponotus mitis (Smith, F., 1858)

= Camponotus mitis =

Species of ant

Camponotus mitis is a species of carpenter ant (genus Camponotus). It is found from India, Sri Lanka, and China.
