= List of ants of Sri Lanka =

Sri Lanka is a tropical island country situated near to the southern tip of the Indian subcontinent. Sri Lanka is home to at least 229 species of ants which span 66 genera and 12 subfamilies. There are 102 endemic species in Sri Lanka, comprising 48.6% of ant species on the island. The following list is according to the Ants of Sri Lanka by Prof. R.K. Sriyani Dias 2014 comprehensive edition by Biodiversity Secretariat on Ministry of Environmental and Renewable Energy of Sri Lanka.

== Ants ==
=== Subfamily: Amblyoponinae ===
- Stigmatomma testaceum

=== Subfamily: Aneuretinae ===
- Aneuretus simoni - Sri Lanka Relict Ant (endemic)

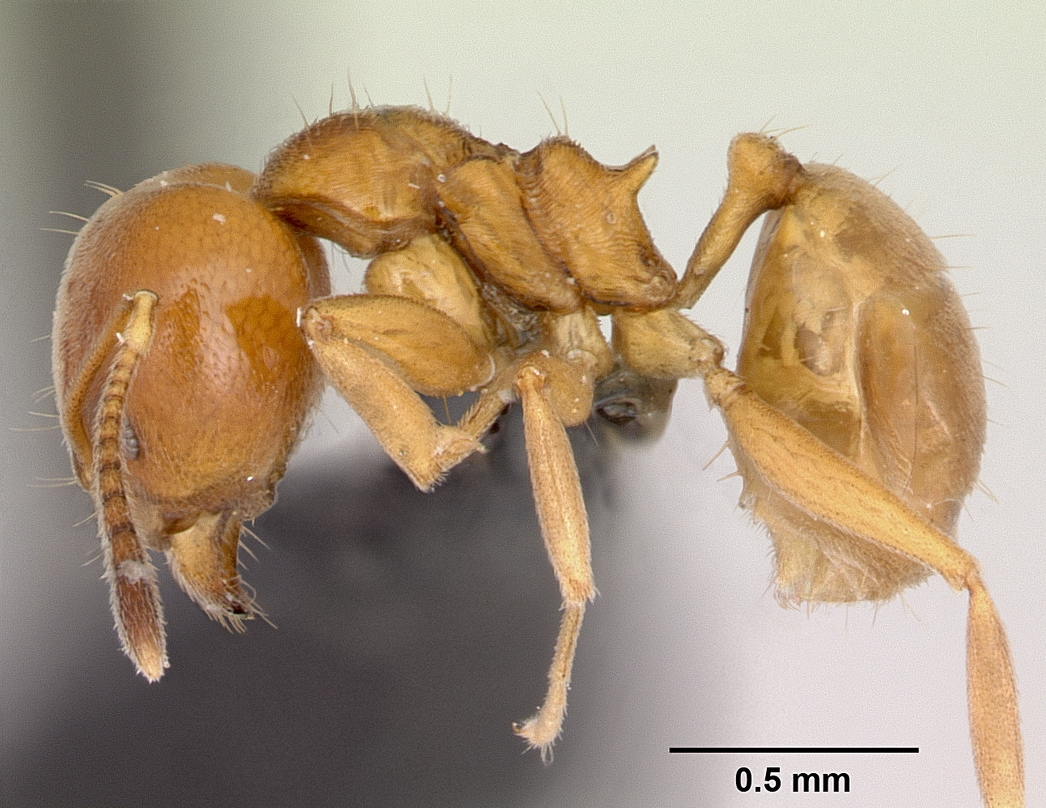
Aneuretus simoni - An endemic ant species of Sri Lanka

=== Subfamily: Dolichoderinae ===
- Dolichoderus taprobanae
- Tapinoma indicum
- Tapinoma melanocephalum
- Technomyrmex albipes

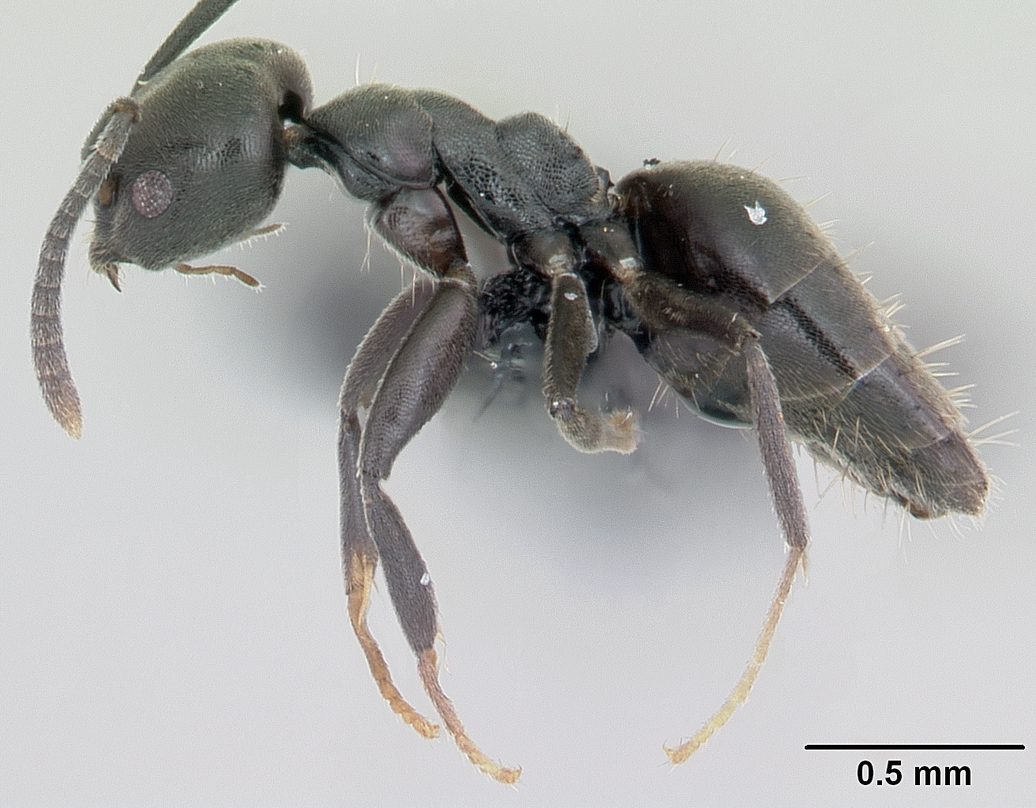
Technomyrmex albipes - Known as "Kalu kumbiya" in Sri Lanka

- Technomyrmex bicolor
- Technomyrmex detorquens
- Technomyrmex elatior
- Technomyrmex horni

=== Subfamily: Dorylinae ===
- Aenictus aitkenii
- Aenictus biroi
- Aenictus ceylonicus
- Aenictus gracilis
- Aenictus pachycerus
- Aenictus porizonoides
- Cerapachys coecus
- Cerapachys fossulatus
- Cerapachys fragosus
- Cerapachys luteoviger
- Cerapachys typhlus
- Dorylus orientalis

=== Subfamily: Ectatomminae ===
- Gnamptogenys coxalis

=== Subfamily: Formicinae ===
- Acropyga acutiventris
- Acropyga rubescens
- Anoplolepis gracilipes

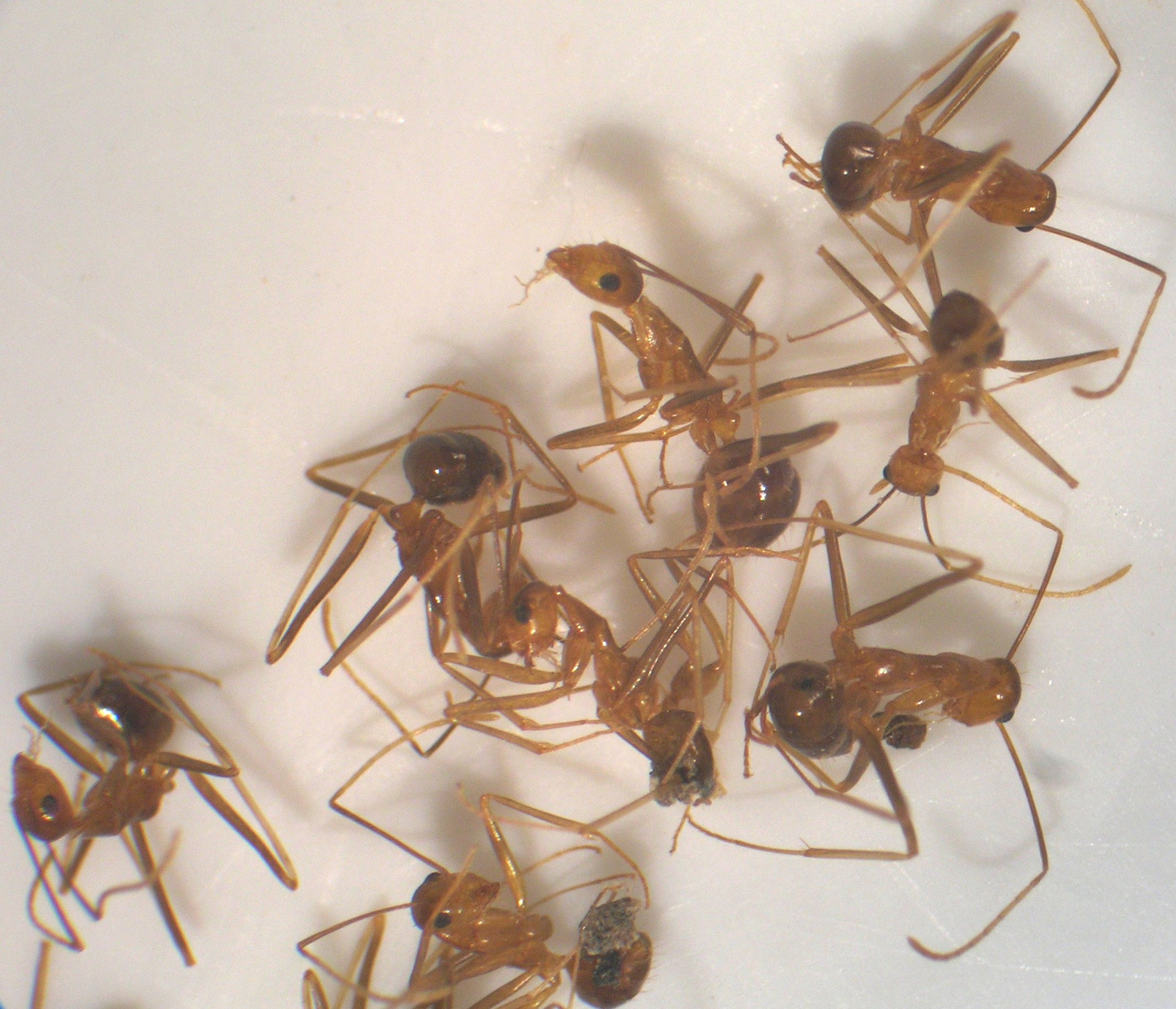
Anoplolepis gracilipes - Known as "Ambalaya" in Sri Lanka, is a troublesome species in houses

- Camponotus albipes
- Camponotus auriculatus
- Camponotus barbatus
- Camponotus ceylonicus
- Camponotus greeni
- Camponotus fletcheri
- Camponotus indeflexus
- Camponotus irritans
- Camponotus isabellae
- Camponotus latebrosus
- Camponotus maculatus
- Camponotus mendax - ssp. integer
- Camponotus mitis
- Camponotus ominosus
- Camponotus rufoglaucus
- Camponotus reticulatus - ssp. yerburyi
- Camponotus sericeus
- Camponotus sesquipedalis
- Camponotus simoni
- Camponotus thraso - ssp. diogenes
- Camponotus varians
- Camponotus variegatus - ssp. infuscoides, intrans
- Camponotus wedda
- Dolichoderus taprobanae
- Lepisiota capensis - ssp. lunaris
- Myrmoteras ceylonicum
- Nylanderia taylori - ssp. levis
- Nylanderia vagabunda
- Nylanderia yerburyi

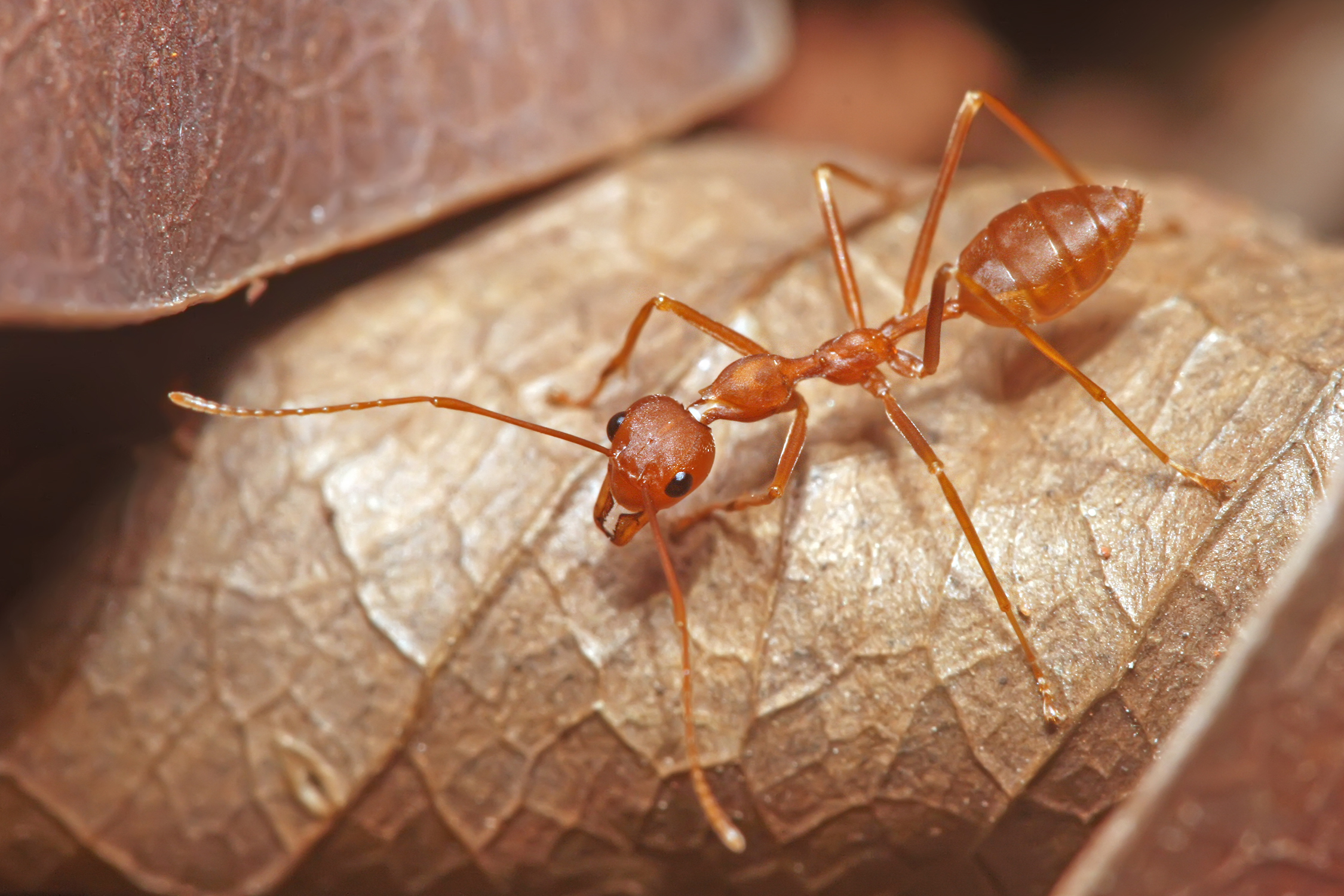
Oecophylla smaragdina - A common ant species in Sri Lanka, commonly known as "Dimiya"

- Oecophylla smaragdina
- Paratrechina longicornis
- Plagiolepis pissina
- Polyrhachis aedipus
- Polyrhachis bugnioni
- Polyrhachis convexa - ssp. isabellae
- Polyrhachis curvispina
- Polyrhachis exercita
- Polyrhachis gibbosa
- Polyrhachis hippomanes - ssp. ceylonensis
- Polyrhachis horni
- Polyrhachis illaudata
- Polyrhachis jerdonii
- Polyrhachis nigra
- Polyrhachis punctillata
- Polyrhachis rastellata
- Polyrhachis rupicapra
- Polyrhachis scissa
- Polyrhachis sophocles
- Polyrhachis thrinax
- Polyrhachis tibialis - ssp. pectita
- Polyrhachis xanthippe
- Polyrhachis yerburyi
- Prenolepis naoroji
- Pseudolasius isabellae

=== Subfamily: Leptanillinae ===
- Leptanilla besucheti
- Protanilla schoedli

=== Subfamily: Myrmicinae ===
- Acanthomyrmex luciolae
- Anillomyrma decamera
- Calyptomyrmex singalensis
- Calyptomyrmex tamil
- Calyptomyrmex vedda
- Cardiocondyla emeryi - ssp. emeryi
- Cardiocondyla minutior
- Cardiocondyla nuda
- Carebara bruni
- Carebara butteli
- Carebara ceylonensis
- Carebara deponens
- Carebara diversa - ssp. taprobanae
- Carebara escherichi
- Carebara nana
- Carebara pygmaea
- Carebara sinhala
- Cataulacus granulatus
- Cataulacus simoni
- Cataulacus taprobanae
- Crematogaster anthracina
- Crematogaster apicalis
- Crematogaster biroi
- Crematogaster brunnescens
- Crematogaster consternens
- Crematogaster desecta
- Crematogaster dohrni - ssp. dohrni, gigas
- Crematogaster pellens
- Crematogaster ransonneti
- Crematogaster rogeri
- Crematogaster rogenhoferi
- Crematogaster rothneyi - ssp. haputalensis
- Crematogaster subnuda
- Dilobocondyla didita
- Lophomyrmex quadrispinosus
- Meranoplus bicolor
- Meranoplus boltoni
- Meranoplus levis
- Meranoplus loebli
- Metapone greeni
- Metapone johni
- Monomorium consternens
- Monomorium floricola
- Monomorium pharaonis
- Monomorium latinode
- Monomorium subopacum
- Monomorium taprobanae
- Myrmicaria brunnea
- Paratopula ceylonica
- Pheidole barreleti
- Pheidole ceylonica
- Pheidole diffidens
- Pheidole gracilipes
- Pheidole horni
- Pheidole latinoda - ssp. angustior, latinoda, peradeniyae
- Pheidole malinsii
- Pheidole megacephala
- Pheidole nietneri
- Pheidole noda
- Pheidole parva
- Pheidole pronotalis
- Pheidole rugosa
- Pheidole spathifera - ssp. yerburyi
- Pheidole sulcaticeps - ssp. sulcaticeps, vellicans
- Pheidole templaria - ssp. euscrobata
- Pheidologeton diversus
- Recurvidris pickburni
- Rhopalomastix escherichi
- Solenopsis geminata
- Solenopsis nitens
- Stereomyrmex horni
- Strumigenys godeffroyi
- Strumigenys inopinata
- Strumigenys lewisi
- Strumigenys lyroessa
- Strumigenys veddha
- Tetramorium bicarinatum
- Tetramorium curvispinosum
- Tetramorium pacificum
- Tetramorium pilosum
- Tetramorium simillimum
- Tetramorium tonganum
- Tetramorium tortuosum
- Tetramorium transversarium
- Tetramorium yerburyi
- Trichomyrmex criniceps
- Trichomyrmex destructor
- Trichomyrmex emeryi - ssp. laevior
- Trichomyrmex rogeri
- Tyrannomyrmex legatus
- Vollenhovia escherichi

=== Subfamily: Ponerinae ===
- Anochetus consultans
- Anochetus longifossatus
- Anochetus madaraszi
- Anochetus nietneri
- Anochetus pangens
- Anochetus yerburyi
- Bothroponera tesseronoda
- Brachyponera luteipes
- Brachyponera obscurans
- Centromyrmex feae - ssp. ceylonicus
- Cryptopone testacea
- Diacamma ceylonense
- Diacamma indicum
- Diacamma rugosum
- Harpegnathos saltator - ssp. taprobanae
- Hypoponera ceylonensis
- Hypoponera confinis
- Hypoponera ragusai
- Hypoponera taprobanae
- Leptogenys diminuta
- Leptogenys exudans
- Leptogenys falcigera
- Leptogenys hysterica
- Leptogenys meritans
- Leptogenys pruinosa
- Leptogenys peuqueti
- Leptogenys processionalis
- Leptogenys yerburyi
- Leptogenys peuqueti
- Mesoponera melanaria
- Myopias amblyops
- Myopopone castanea
- Odontomachus simillimus
- Pachycondyla luteipes
- Platythyrea parallela
- Platythyrea clypeata
- Pseudoneoponera rufipes

=== Subfamily: Pseudomyrmecinae ===
- Tetraponera allaborans
- Tetraponera nigra - var. insularis
- Tetraponera rufonigra

The following species were also described from Sri Lanka, but their true identities are currently unknown due to lack of experiments.

- Formica fuscicauda
- Formica subpicea
- Myrmica obscurata
- Myrmica pilinodis

== Also check ==
- Ants of Sri Lanka, a book by Dr. Shriyani Dias
