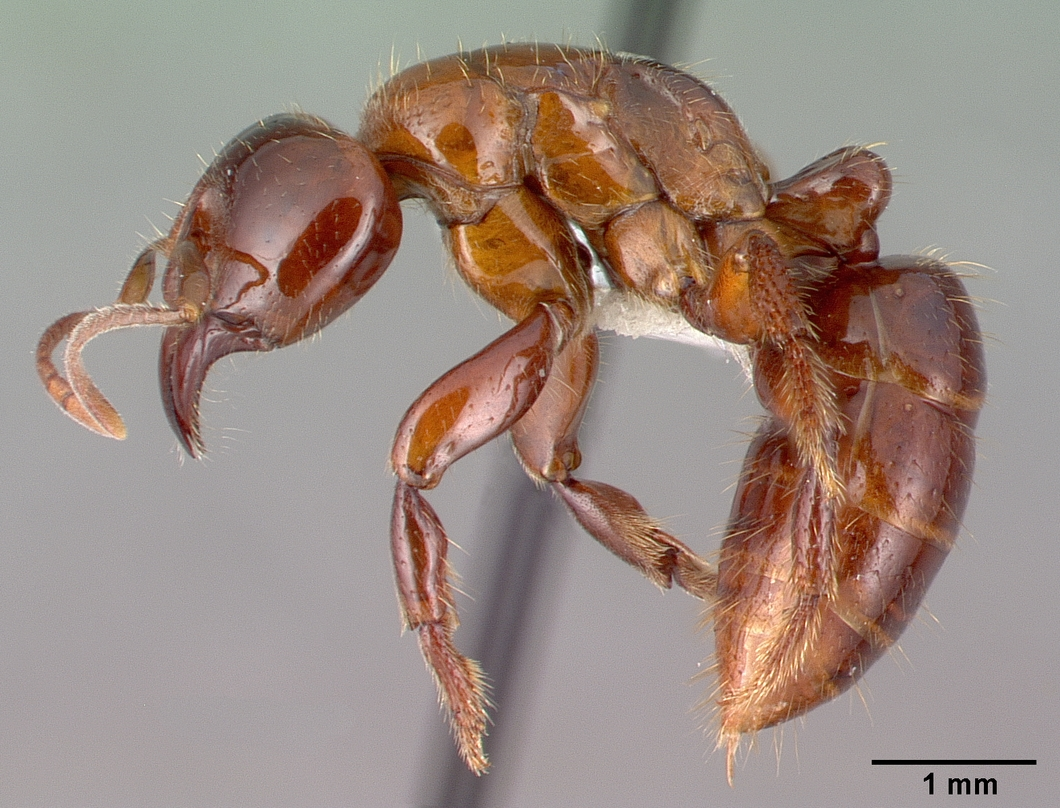
- Centromyrmex alfaroi worker

Scientific classification
- Kingdom: Animalia
- Phylum: Arthropoda
- Clade: Pancrustacea
- Class: Insecta
- Order: Hymenoptera
- Family: Formicidae
- Subfamily: Ponerinae
- Tribe: Ponerini
- Alliance: Plectroctena genus group
- Genus: Centromyrmex; Mayr, 1866

Type species
- Centromyrmex bohemanni

Diversity
- 15 species

Synonyms
- Glyphopone Forel, 1913; Leptopone Arnold, 1916; Spalacomyrmex Emery, 1889; Typhloteras Karavaiev, 1925

= Centromyrmex =

Genus of ants

Centromyrmex is a pantropical, though mainly Afrotropical, genus of ants in the subfamily Ponerinae. This ponerine ant was recorded for the first time in French Guiana and the most northerly point of recording was in Costa Rica. The specimens reported here were collected in a region of Amazon Forest with flight interception traps.

== Biology ==
They are predatory on termites, where a group hunting strategy may be employed, or may prey more generally on invertebrates in the upper soil layer of forests. Little is known about their biology, but workers lack eyes and are well adapted to a subterranean lifestyle by way of burrowing. They also are equipped with short, spiny, and powerful legs. Nest sites are usually found near or even inside of termite nests.

== Species ==
- Centromyrmex alfaroi Emery, 1890
- Centromyrmex angolensis Santschi, 1937
- Centromyrmex bequaerti (Forel, 1913)
- Centromyrmex brachycola (Roger, 1861)
- Centromyrmex decessor Bolton & Fisher, 2008
- Centromyrmex ereptor Bolton & Fisher, 2008
- Centromyrmex feae (Emery, 1889)
- Centromyrmex fugator Bolton & Fisher, 2008
- Centromyrmex gigas Forel, 1911
- Centromyrmex hamulatus (Karavaiev, 1925)
- Centromyrmex longiventris Santschi, 1919
- Centromyrmex praedator Bolton & Fisher, 2008
- Centromyrmex raptor Bolton & Fisher, 2008
- Centromyrmex secutor Bolton & Fisher, 2008
- Centromyrmex sellaris Mayr, 1896
