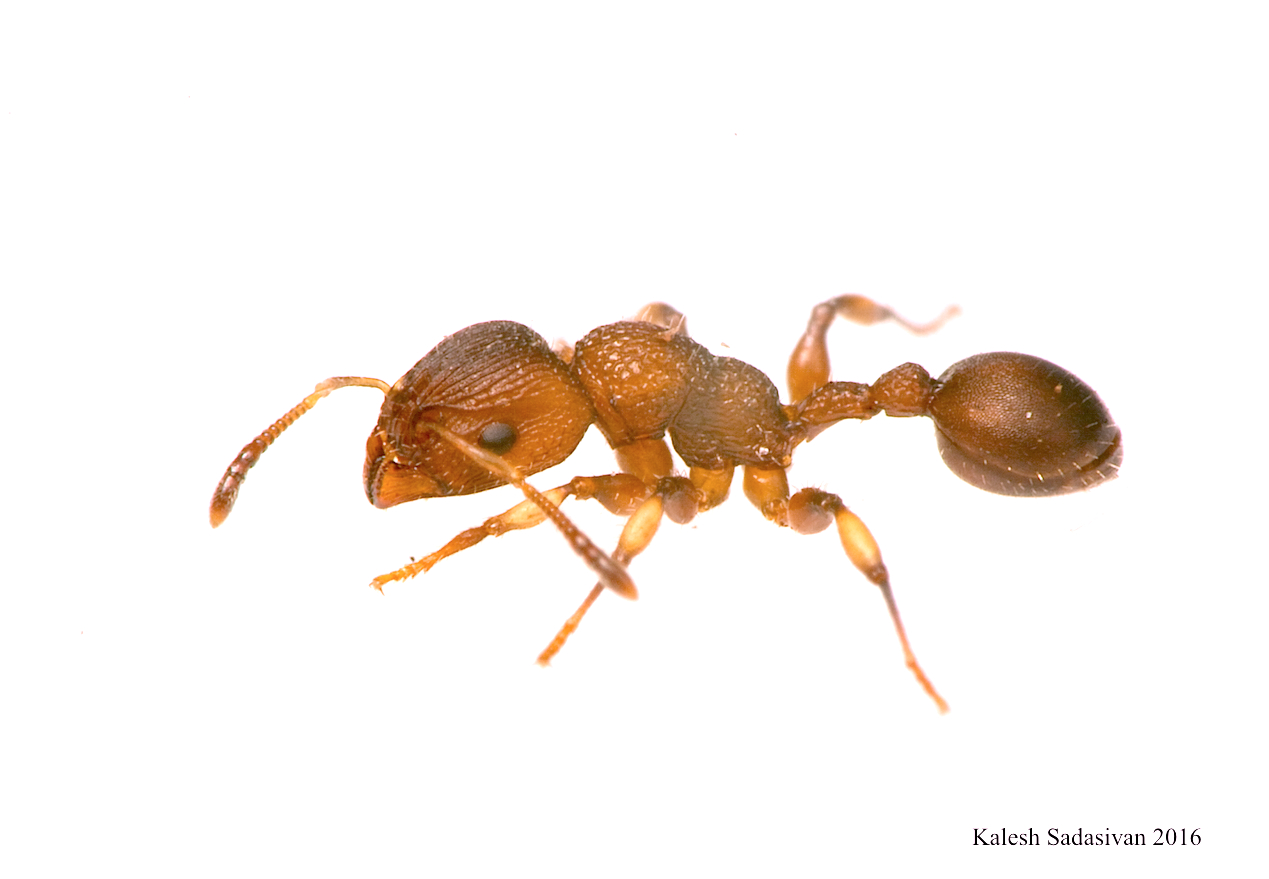

Scientific classification
- Kingdom: Animalia
- Phylum: Arthropoda
- Clade: Pancrustacea
- Class: Insecta
- Order: Hymenoptera
- Family: Formicidae
- Subfamily: Myrmicinae
- Genus: Dilobocondyla
- Species: D. bangalorica

Binomial name
- Dilobocondyla bangalorica Varghese, 2006

= Dilobocondyla bangalorica =

Species of ant

Dilobocondyla bangalorica is a species of ant in the subfamily Myrmicinae. It is endemic to India. This arboreal ant nests in dead wood and crevices in tree barks. The species name is after the type locality, Bangalore, where the ant was discovered in 2006.

== Ecology ==
The ants build their nest in the frangipani plant species Plumeria alba and Plumeria rubra. While they live in colonies like other ants, they forage individually on tree trunks.

== Description ==
Workers measure 3.4–4.1 mm (0.13–0.16 in) in total length. The species differs from other known species in the smaller size of worker and queen ants, the sculpted thorax and pedicel, colouration, six well defined mandibular teeth, and the lesser number of rugosities between the frontal carinae. The spines on the head and thorax are blunt, thus differentiating this species from others.
