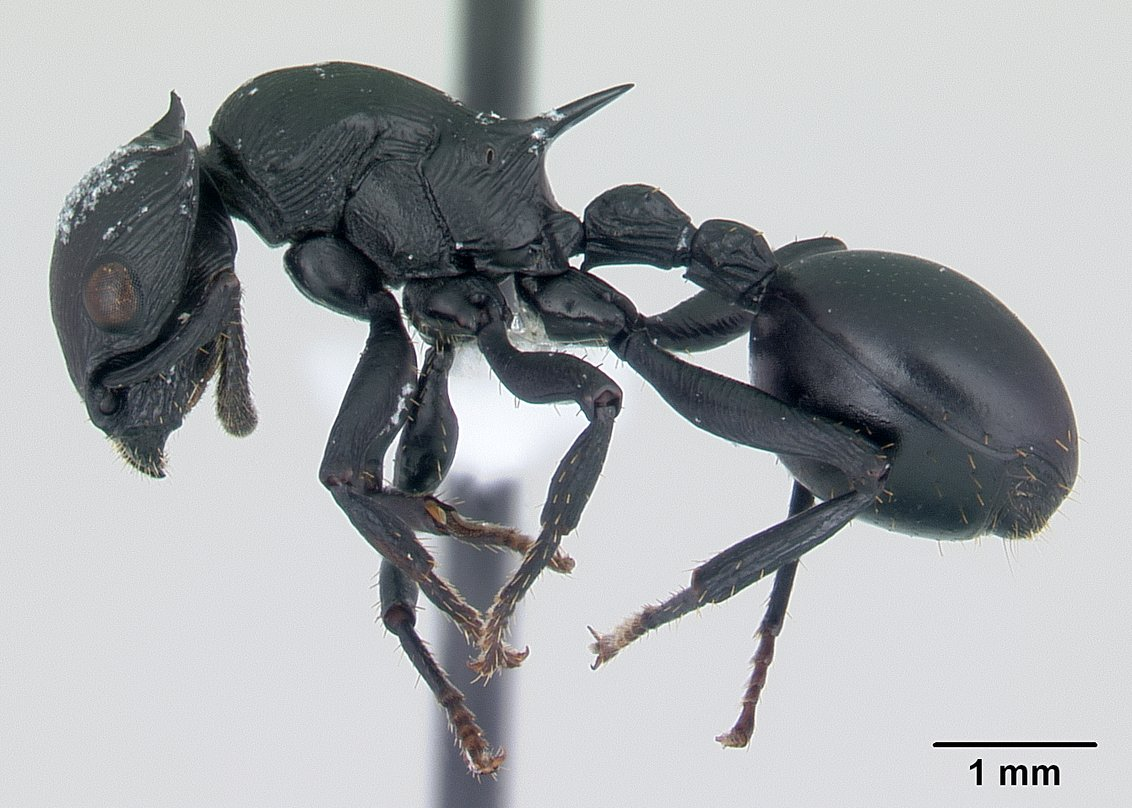
- Cataulacus oberthueri worker

Scientific classification
- Kingdom: Animalia
- Phylum: Arthropoda
- Class: Insecta
- Order: Hymenoptera
- Family: Formicidae
- Subfamily: Myrmicinae
- Tribe: Crematogastrini
- Alliance: Cataulacus genus group
- Genus: Cataulacus; Smith, 1853

Type species
- Cataulacus taprobanae Smith, 1853

Diversity
- 68 species

Synonyms
- Otomyrmex Forel, 1891

= Cataulacus =

Genus of ants

Cataulacus is a genus of ants in the subfamily Myrmicinae. The genus is distributed in the Paleotropical regions, mainly in the Afrotropics. Most species are found in forests, but a few are known from more open and arid habitats.

== Species ==
- Cataulacus adpressus Bolton, 1974
- †Cataulacus anthracinus (Heer, 1849)
- Cataulacus bequaerti Forel, 1913
- Cataulacus boltoni Snelling, 1979
- Cataulacus brevisetosus Forel, 1901
- Cataulacus catuvolcus Bolton, 1974
- Cataulacus centrurus Bolton, 1982
- Cataulacus cestus Bolton, 1982
- Cataulacus chapmani Bolton, 1974
- Cataulacus difficilis Santschi, 1916
- Cataulacus ebrardi Forel, 1886
- Cataulacus egenus Santschi, 1911
- Cataulacus elongatus Santschi, 1924
- Cataulacus erinaceus Stitz, 1910
- Cataulacus flagitiosus Smith, 1862
- Cataulacus fricatidorsus Santschi, 1914
- Cataulacus granulatus (Latreille, 1802)
- Cataulacus greggi Bolton, 1974
- Cataulacus guineensis Smith, 1853
- Cataulacus hispidulus Smith, 1865
- Cataulacus horridus Smith, 1857
- Cataulacus huberi André, 1890
- Cataulacus impressus Bolton, 1974
- Cataulacus inermis Santschi, 1924
- Cataulacus intrudens (Smith, 1876)
- Cataulacus jacksoni Bolton, 1982
- Cataulacus jeanneli Santschi, 1914
- Cataulacus kenyensis Santschi, 1935
- Cataulacus kohli Mayr, 1895
- Cataulacus latissimus Emery, 1893
- Cataulacus latus Forel, 1891
- Cataulacus lobatus Mayr, 1895
- Cataulacus longinodus Forel, 1912
- Cataulacus lujae Forel, 1911
- Cataulacus marginatus Bolton, 1974
- Cataulacus mckeyi Snelling, 1979
- Cataulacus micans Mayr, 1901
- Cataulacus mocquerysi André, 1889
- Cataulacus moloch Bolton, 1982
- Cataulacus muticus Emery, 1889
- Cataulacus nenassus Bolton, 1974
- Cataulacus oberthueri Forel, 1891
- Cataulacus pilosus Santschi, 1920
- †Cataulacus planiceps Emery, 1891
- †Cataulacus plebeius De Andrade & Baroni Urbani, 2004
- Cataulacus pompom Snelling, 1979
- Cataulacus porcatus Emery, 1899
- Cataulacus praetextus Smith, 1867
- Cataulacus pullus Santschi, 1910
- Cataulacus pygmaeus André, 1890
- Cataulacus regularis Forel, 1892
- Cataulacus resinosus Viehmeyer, 1913
- Cataulacus reticulatus Smith, 1857
- Cataulacus satrap Bolton, 1982
- Cataulacus setosus Smith, 1860
- †Cataulacus silvestrii Emery, 1891
- Cataulacus simoni Emery, 1893
- Cataulacus striativentris Santschi, 1924
- Cataulacus taprobanae Smith, 1853
- Cataulacus tardus Santschi, 1914
- Cataulacus taylori Bolton, 1982
- Cataulacus tenuis Emery, 1899
- Cataulacus theobromicola Santschi, 1939
- Cataulacus traegaordhi Santschi, 1914
- Cataulacus voeltzkowi Forel, 1907
- Cataulacus vorticus Bolton, 1974
- Cataulacus wasmanni Forel, 1897
- Cataulacus weissi Santschi, 1913
- Cataulacus wissmannii Forel, 1894
