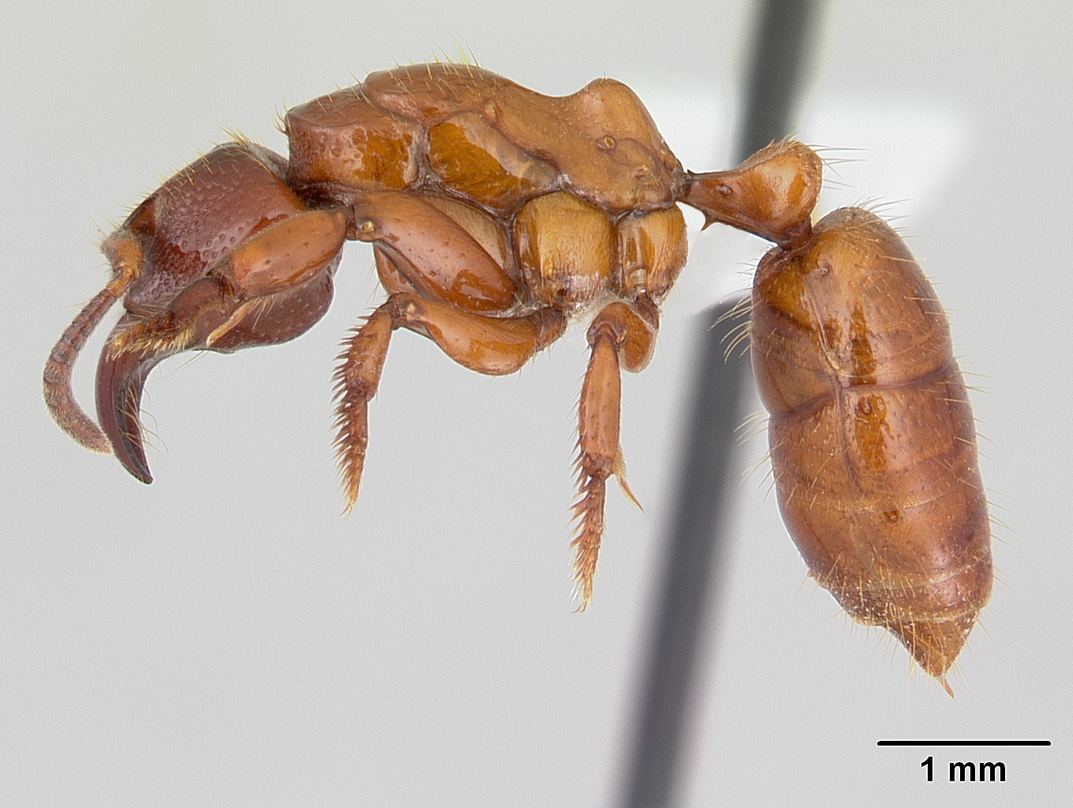

Scientific classification
- Domain: Eukaryota
- Kingdom: Animalia
- Phylum: Arthropoda
- Class: Insecta
- Order: Hymenoptera
- Family: Formicidae
- Genus: Centromyrmex
- Species: C. decessor

Binomial name
- Centromyrmex decessor Bolton & Fisher, 2008

= Centromyrmex decessor =

Species of ant

Centromyrmex decessor is a species of ant in the family Formicidae.
