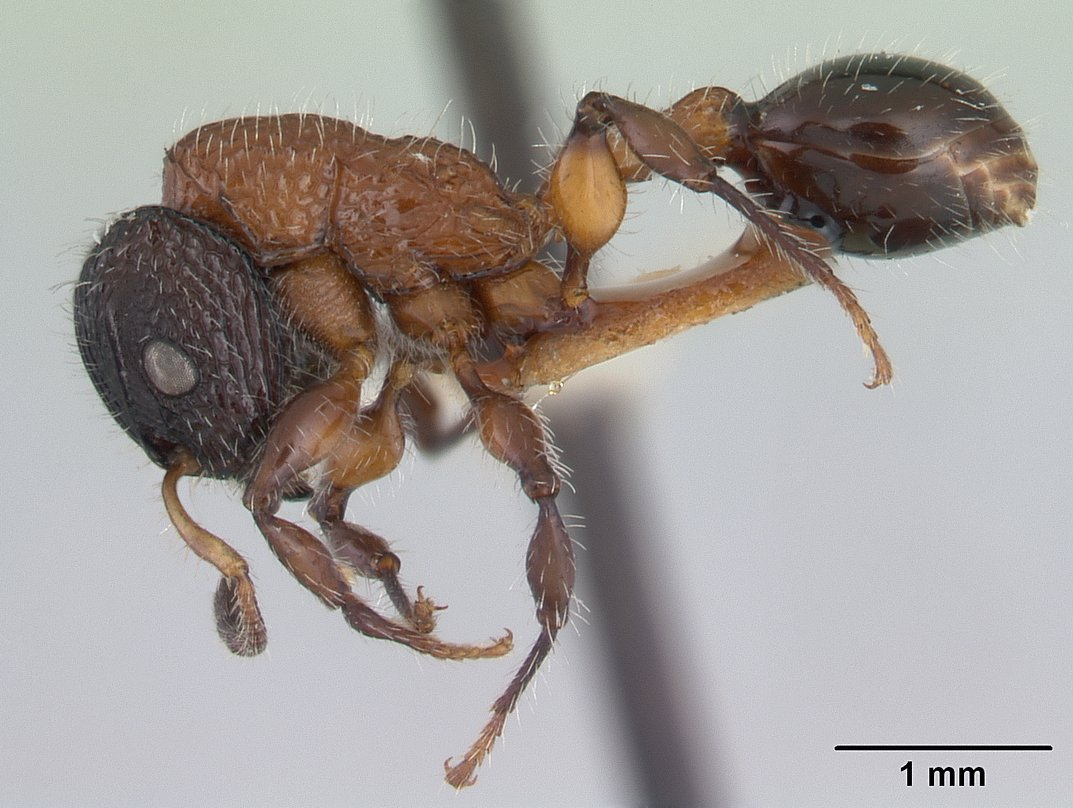
- Dilobocondyla fouqueti worker

Scientific classification
- Kingdom: Animalia
- Phylum: Arthropoda
- Class: Insecta
- Order: Hymenoptera
- Family: Formicidae
- Subfamily: Myrmicinae
- Tribe: Crematogastrini
- Alliance: Myrmecina genus group
- Genus: Dilobocondyla; Santschi, 1910

Type species
- Atopomyrmex selebensis

Diversity
- 19 species

= Dilobocondyla =

Genus of ants

Dilobocondyla is a genus of ants in the subfamily Myrmicinae. The genus is distributed in the Oriental and Australasian realms. It seems to be rare, with most species known only from single specimens.

== Species ==
- Dilobocondyla bangalorica Varghese, 2006
- Dilobocondyla borneensis Wheeler, 1916
- Dilobocondyla carinata Zettel & Bruckner, 2013
- Dilobocondyla cataulacoidea (Stitz, 1911)
- Dilobocondyla chapmani Wheeler, 1924
- Dilobocondyla didita (Walker, 1859)
- Dilobocondyla eguchii Bharti & Kumar, 2013
- Dilobocondyla fouqueti Santschi, 1910
- Dilobocondyla fulva Viehmeyer, 1916
- Dilobocondyla gaoyureni Bharti & Kumar, 2013
- Dilobocondyla gasteroreticulatus Bharti & Kumar, 2013
- Dilobocondyla karnyi Wheeler, 1924
- Dilobocondyla oswini Zettel & Bruckner, 2013
- Dilobocondyla propotriangulatus Bharti & Kumar, 2013
- Dilobocondyla rugosa Zettel & Bruckner, 2013
- Dilobocondyla sebesiana Wheeler, 1924
- Dilobocondyla selebensis (Emery, 1898)
- Dilobocondyla silviae Zettel & Bruckner, 2013
- Dilobocondyla yamanei Bharti & Kumar, 2013
