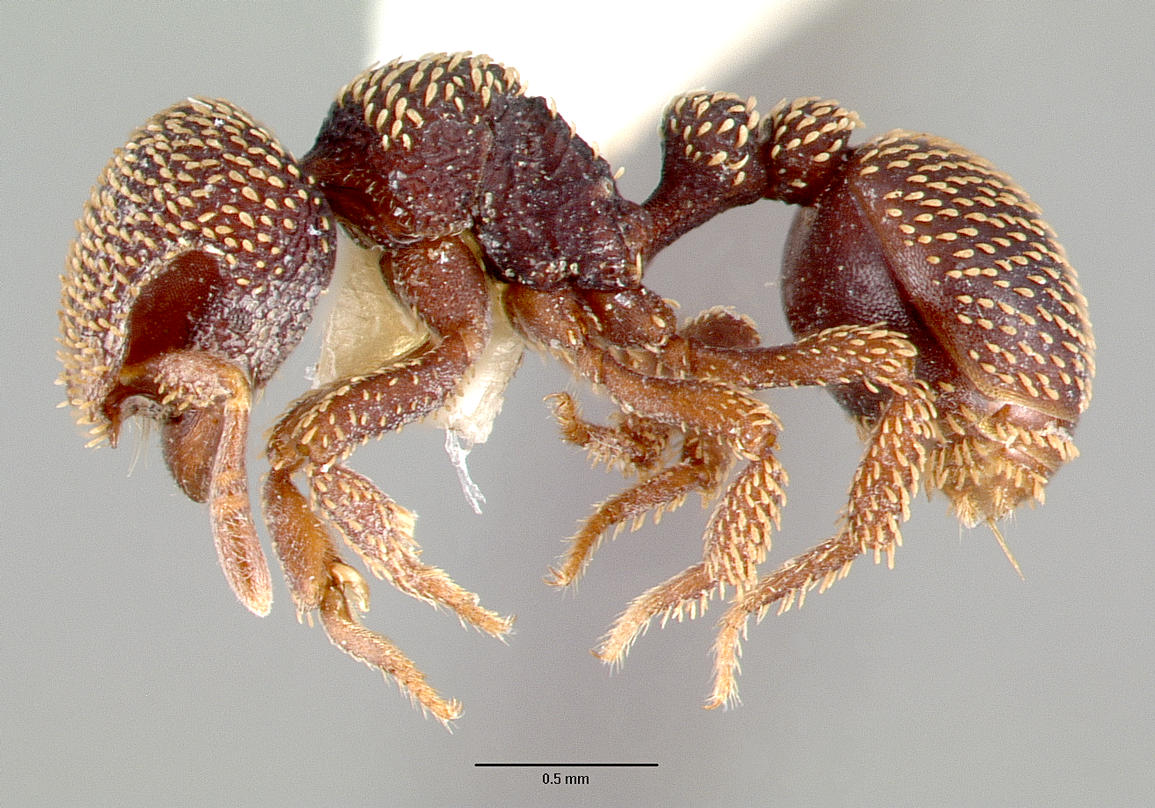
- Calyptomyrmex beccarii worker

Scientific classification
- Kingdom: Animalia
- Phylum: Arthropoda
- Class: Insecta
- Order: Hymenoptera
- Family: Formicidae
- Subfamily: Myrmicinae
- Tribe: Crematogastrini
- Genus: Calyptomyrmex; Emery, 1887

Type species
- Calyptomyrmex beccarii

Diversity
- 37 species

= Calyptomyrmex =

Genus of ants

Calyptomyrmex is a genus of ants in the subfamily Myrmicinae. The genus is distributed from Africa to India and east to New Caledonia. They are mainly found in the rainforest, where they forage alone or in small numbers.

== Species ==
- Calyptomyrmex arnoldi (Forel, 1913)
- Calyptomyrmex asper Shattuck, 2011
- Calyptomyrmex barak Bolton, 1981
- Calyptomyrmex beccarii Emery, 1887
- Calyptomyrmex brevis Weber, 1943
- Calyptomyrmex brunneus Arnold, 1948
- Calyptomyrmex caledonicus Shattuck, 2011
- Calyptomyrmex clavatus Weber, 1952
- Calyptomyrmex claviseta (Santschi, 1914)
- Calyptomyrmex danum Shattuck, 2011
- Calyptomyrmex duhun Bolton, 1981
- Calyptomyrmex foreli Emery, 1915
- Calyptomyrmex fragarus Shattuck, 2011
- Calyptomyrmex friederikae Kutter, 1976
- Calyptomyrmex fritillus Shattuck, 2011
- Calyptomyrmex grammus Shattuck, 2011
- Calyptomyrmex kaurus Bolton, 1981
- Calyptomyrmex lineolus Shattuck, 2011
- Calyptomyrmex loweryi Shattuck, 2011
- Calyptomyrmex nedjem Bolton, 1981
- Calyptomyrmex nummuliticus Santschi, 1914
- Calyptomyrmex ocullatus Shattuck, 2011
- Calyptomyrmex piripilis Santschi, 1923
- Calyptomyrmex rectopilosus Dlussky & Radchenko, 1990
- Calyptomyrmex rennefer Bolton, 1981
- Calyptomyrmex retrostriatus Shattuck, 2011
- Calyptomyrmex ryderae Shattuck, 2011
- Calyptomyrmex sabahensis Shattuck, 2011
- Calyptomyrmex shasu Bolton, 1981
- Calyptomyrmex singalensis Baroni Urbani, 1975
- Calyptomyrmex sparsus Shattuck, 2011
- Calyptomyrmex stellatus Santschi, 1915
- Calyptomyrmex tamil Baroni Urbani, 1975
- Calyptomyrmex taylori Shattuck, 2011
- Calyptomyrmex tensus Bolton, 1981
- Calyptomyrmex vedda Baroni Urbani, 1975
- Calyptomyrmex wittmeri Baroni Urbani, 1975
