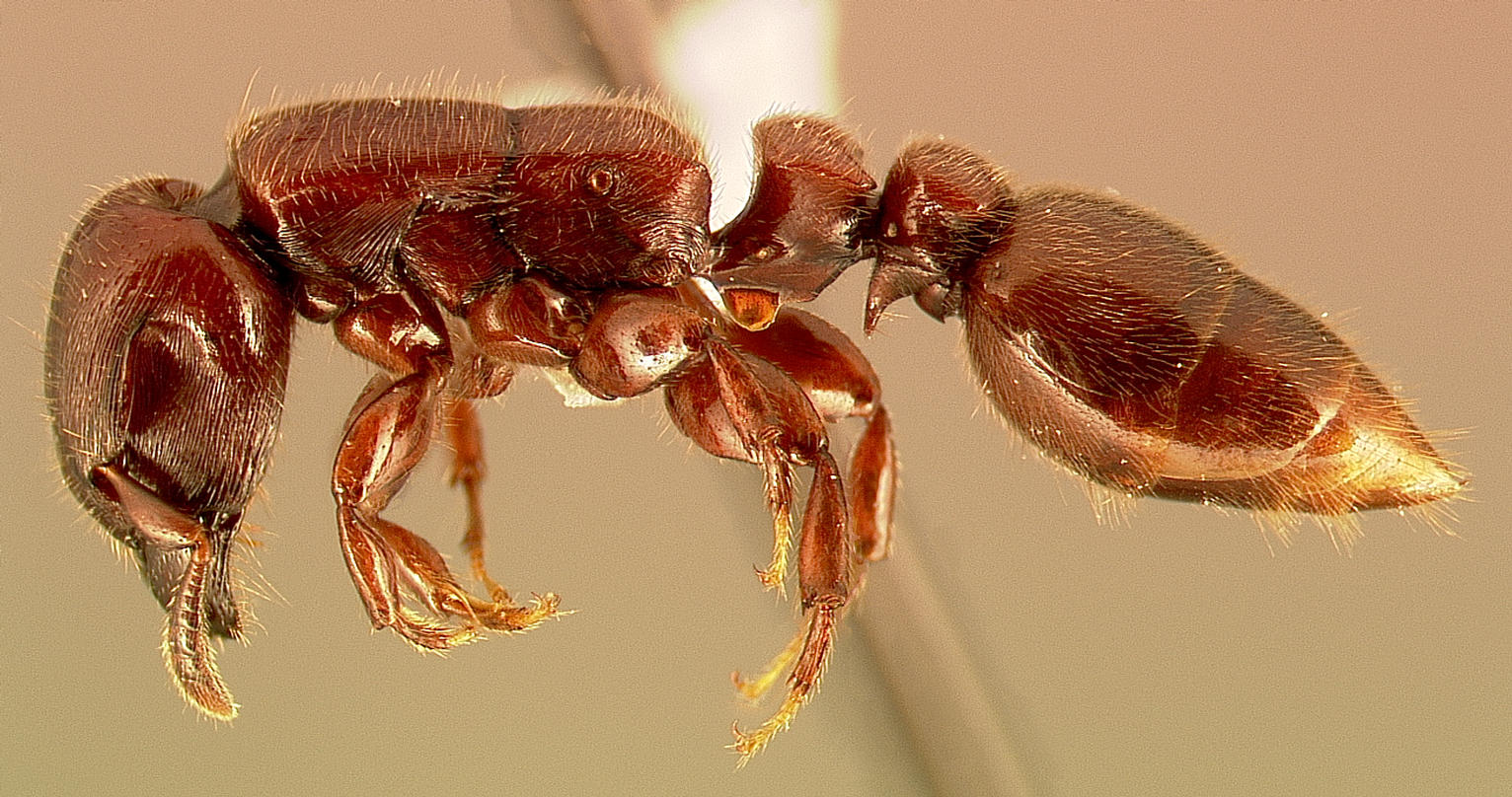
- Metapone emersoni worker

Scientific classification
- Kingdom: Animalia
- Phylum: Arthropoda
- Class: Insecta
- Order: Hymenoptera
- Family: Formicidae
- Subfamily: Myrmicinae
- Tribe: Crematogastrini
- Genus: Metapone; Forel, 1911

Type species
- Metapone greeni Forel, 1911

Diversity
- 21 species

= Metapone =

Genus of ants

Metapone is an Old World genus of ants in the subfamily Myrmicinae. The genus is found in the Indo-Australian, Oriental and Malagasy regions. Most species are known only from a few specimens.

== Species ==
- Metapone bakeri Wheeler, 1916
- Metapone emersoni Gregg, 1958
- Metapone gracilis Wheeler, 1935
- Metapone greeni Forel, 1911
- Metapone hewitti Wheeler, 1919
- Metapone jacobsoni Crawley, 1924
- Metapone johni Karavaiev, 1933
- Metapone kanak Taylor, 2018
- Metapone krombeini Smith, 1947
- Metapone leae Wheeler, 1919
- Metapone madagascarica Gregg, 1958
- Metapone mjobergi Forel, 1915
- Metapone murphyi Wang, Yamada & Eguchi, 2019
- Metapone nicobarensis Tiwari & Jonathan, 1986
- Metapone nivanuata Taylor, 2018
- Metapone quadridentata Eguchi, 1998
- Metapone sauteri Forel, 1912
- Metapone tillyardi Wheeler, 1919
- Metapone tricolor McAreavey, 1949
- Metapone truki Smith, 1953
- Metapone vincimus Alpert, 2007
