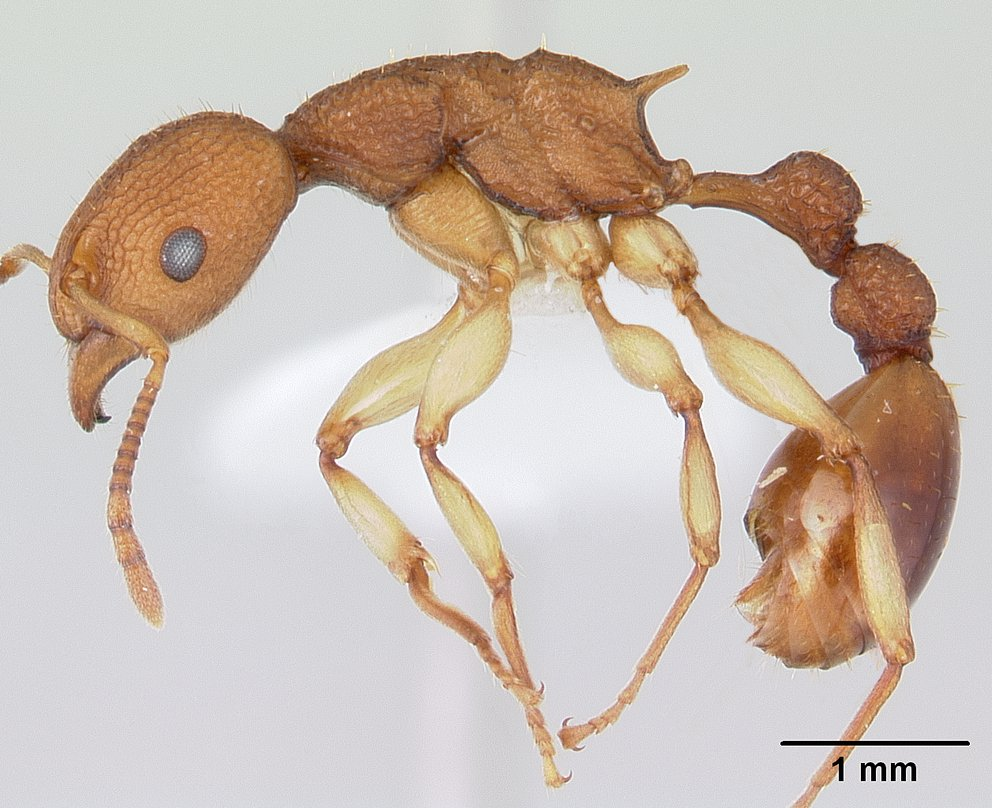
- Paratopula macta worker from Thailand

Scientific classification
- Kingdom: Animalia
- Phylum: Arthropoda
- Class: Insecta
- Order: Hymenoptera
- Family: Formicidae
- Subfamily: Myrmicinae
- Tribe: Crematogastrini
- Genus: Paratopula; Wheeler, 1919

Type species
- Atopomyrmex ceylonicus Emery, 1901

Diversity
- 11 species

= Paratopula =

Genus of ants

Paratopula is a genus of ants in the subfamily Myrmicinae. The genus consists of arboreal species known from the Oriental and Indo-Australian regions. Little is known about their biology.

== Species ==
- Paratopula andamanensis (Forel, 1903)
- Paratopula ankistra Bolton, 1988
- Paratopula catocha Bolton, 1988
- Paratopula ceylonica (Emery, 1901)
- Paratopula demeta Bolton, 1988
- Paratopula intermedia Sheela & Narendran, 1998
- Paratopula longispina (Stitz, 1938)
- Paratopula macta Bolton, 1988
- Paratopula oculata (Smith, 1857)
- Paratopula sumatrensis (Forel, 1913)
- Paratopula zhengi Xu & Xu, 2011
