= Lophomyrmex opaciceps =

Scientific classification
- Kingdom: Animalia
- Phylum: Arthropoda
- Clade: Pancrustacea
- Class: Insecta
- Order: Hymenoptera
- Family: Formicidae
- Subfamily: Myrmicinae
- Genus: Lophomyrmex
- Species: L. opaciceps

Binomial name
- Lophomyrmex opaciceps Viehmeyer, 1922

Species of ant

Lophomyrmex opaciceps is a species of ant in the subfamily Formicinae. It can be found in Indonesian rainforests. It is a species of ant in the subfamily Formicinae. These ants are not aggressive. They inhabit the floor of the rainforest, streambeds, and leaf litter. They possess stingers but these are not noticeable. They are safe to handle.
