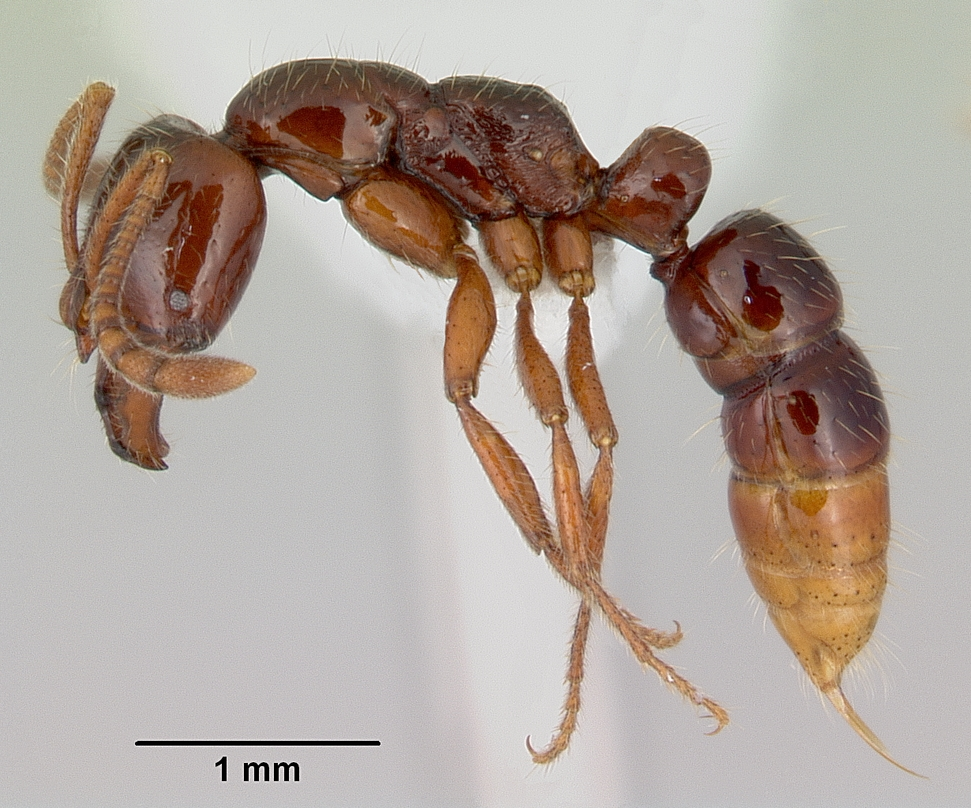
- Myopias chapmani worker

Scientific classification
- Kingdom: Animalia
- Phylum: Arthropoda
- Class: Insecta
- Order: Hymenoptera
- Family: Formicidae
- Subfamily: Ponerinae
- Tribe: Ponerini
- Genus: Myopias; Roger, 1861

Type species
- Myopias amblyops Roger, 1861

Diversity
- 39 species

Synonyms
- Bradyponera Mayr, 1886; Trapeziopelta Mayr, 1862

= Myopias =

Genus of ants

Myopias is a genus of ants in the subfamily Ponerinae. The genus is known from the Oriental, Indo-Australian, and Australasian regions.

== Species ==
- Myopias amblyops Roger, 1861
- Myopias bidens (Emery, 1900)
- Myopias breviloba (Wheeler, 1919)
- Myopias castaneicola (Donisthorpe, 1938)
- Myopias chapmani Willey & Brown, 1983
- Myopias concava Willey & Brown, 1983
- Myopias conicara Xu, 1998
- Myopias crawleyi (Donisthorpe, 1941)
- Myopias cribriceps Emery, 1901
- Myopias daia Xu, Burwell & Nakamura, 2014
- Myopias delta Willey & Brown, 1983
- Myopias densesticta Willey & Brown, 1983
- Myopias emeryi (Forel, 1913)
- Myopias gigas Willey & Brown, 1983
- Myopias hania Xu & Liu, 2011
- Myopias hollandi (Forel, 1901)
- Myopias julivora Willey & Brown, 1983
- Myopias kuehni (Forel, 1902)
- Myopias latinoda (Emery, 1897)
- Myopias levigata (Emery, 1901)
- Myopias lobosa Willey & Brown, 1983
- Myopias loriai (Emery, 1897)
- Myopias luoba Xu & Liu, 2011
- Myopias maligna (Smith, 1861)
- Myopias mandibularis (Crawley, 1924)
- Myopias mayri (Donisthorpe, 1932)
- Myopias media Willey & Brown, 1983
- Myopias menba Xu & Liu, 2011
- Myopias modiglianii (Emery, 1900)
- Myopias nops Willey & Brown, 1983
- Myopias papua Snelling, 2008
- Myopias philippinensis (Menozzi, 1925)
- Myopias ruthae Willey & Brown, 1983
- Myopias santschii (Viehmeyer, 1914)
- Myopias shivalikensis Bharti & Wachkoo, 2012
- Myopias tasmaniensis Wheeler, 1923
- Myopias tenuis (Emery, 1900)
- Myopias trumani (Donisthorpe, 1949)
- Myopias xiphias (Emery, 1900)
