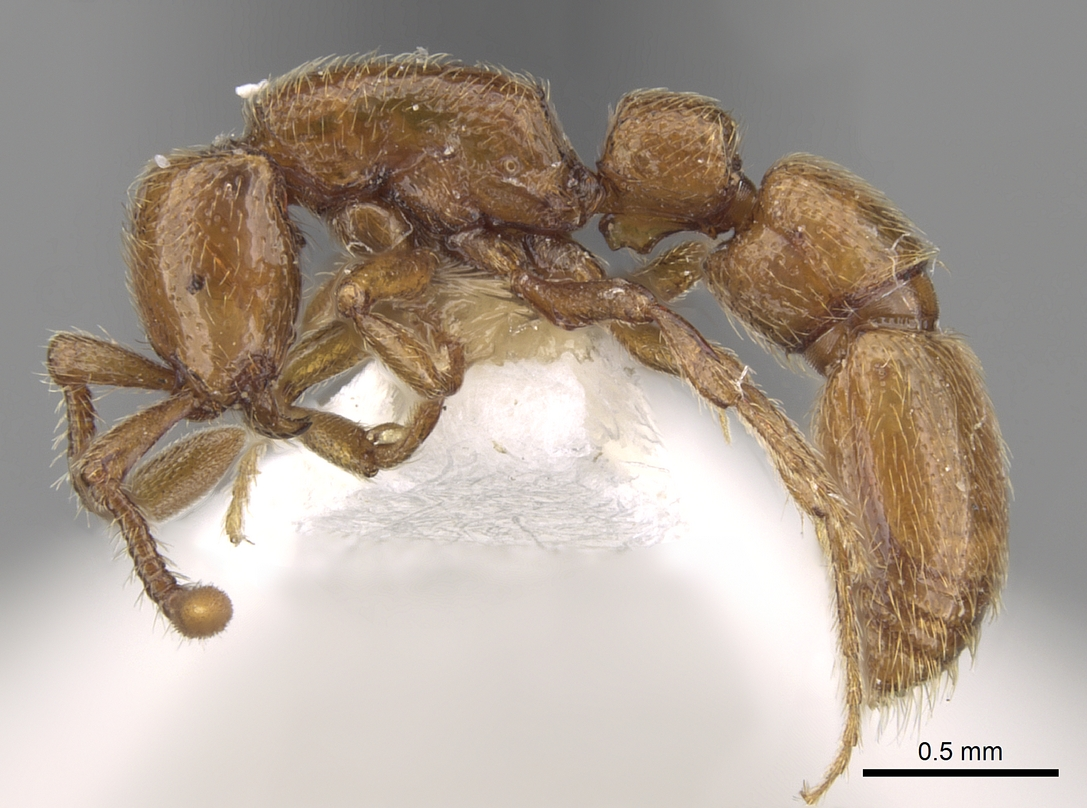
- Parasyscia piochardi

Scientific classification
- Kingdom: Animalia
- Phylum: Arthropoda
- Class: Insecta
- Order: Hymenoptera
- Family: Formicidae
- Subfamily: Dorylinae
- Genus: Parasyscia; Emery, 1882

Type species
- Parasyscia piochardi Emery, 1882

Diversity
- 51 species

= Parasyscia =

Genus of ants

Parasyscia is a genus of ants in the subfamily Dorylinae containing approximately 50 described species. The genus is distributed across the Afrotropical, Australasia, Indomalaya, Malagasy, Oceania, and Palearctic bioregions. Parasyscia was described by Carlo Emery (1882), moved to a subgenus of Cerapachys by Forel (1892) and finally placed as a junior synonym of Cerapachys by Kempf (1972). Parasyscia was resurrected as a valid genus by Borowiec (2016) during the redescription of the doryline genera.

== Species ==
- Parasyscia afer (Forel, 1907)
- Parasyscia aitkenii (Forel, 1900)
- Parasyscia arnoldi (Forel, 1914)
- Parasyscia browni (Bharti & Wachkoo, 2013)
- Parasyscia bryanti (Wheeler, 1919)
- Parasyscia centurio (Brown, 1975)
- Parasyscia conservata (Viehmeyer, 1913)
- Parasyscia cribrinodis (Emery, 1899)
- Parasyscia desposyne (Wilson, 1959)
- Parasyscia dohertyi (Emery, 1902)
- Parasyscia dominula (Wilson, 1959)
- Parasyscia faurei (Arnold, 1949)
- Parasyscia flavaclavata (Donisthorpe, 1938)
- Parasyscia fossulata (Forel, 1895)
- Parasyscia foveolata (Radchenko, 1993)
- Parasyscia hashimotoi (Terayama, 1996)
- Parasyscia imerinensis Forel, 1891
- Parasyscia inconspicua (Emery, 1901)
- Parasyscia indica (Brown, 1975)
- Parasyscia kenyensis (Consani, 1951)
- Parasyscia keralensis (Karmaly, 2012)
- Parasyscia kodecorum (Brown, 1975)
- Parasyscia lamborni (Crawley, 1923)
- Parasyscia lindrothi (Wilson, 1959)
- Parasyscia luteoviger (Brown, 1975)
- Parasyscia majuscula (Mann, 1921)
- Parasyscia muiri (Wheeler & Chapman, 1925)
- Parasyscia natalensis (Forel, 1901)
- Parasyscia nitens (Donisthorpe, 1949)
- Parasyscia nitidulus (Brown, 1975)
- Parasyscia opaca (Emery, 1901)
- Parasyscia peringueyi Emery, 1886
- Parasyscia piochardi Emery, 1882
- Parasyscia polynikes (Wilson, 1959)
- Parasyscia reticulata (Emery, 1923)
- Parasyscia rifati Sharaf & Akbar, 2018
- Parasyscia rufithorax (Wheeler & Chapman, 1925)
- Parasyscia salimani (Karavaiev, 1925)
- Parasyscia schoedli (Bharti & Akbar, 2013)
- Parasyscia sculpturata (Mann, 1921)
- Parasyscia seema (Bharti & Akbar, 2013)
- Parasyscia simeuluensis Pryatna et al., 2026
- Parasyscia sudanensis (Weber, 1942)
- Parasyscia superata (Wilson, 1959)
- Parasyscia sylvicola (Arnold, 1955)
- Parasyscia terricola (Mann, 1919)
- Parasyscia valida (Arnold, 1960)
- Parasyscia villiersi (Bernard, 1953)
- Parasyscia vitiensis (Mann, 1921)
- Parasyscia wighti (Bharti & Akbar, 2013)
- Parasyscia wittmeri (Collingwood, 1985)
- Parasyscia zimmermani (Wilson, 1959)
