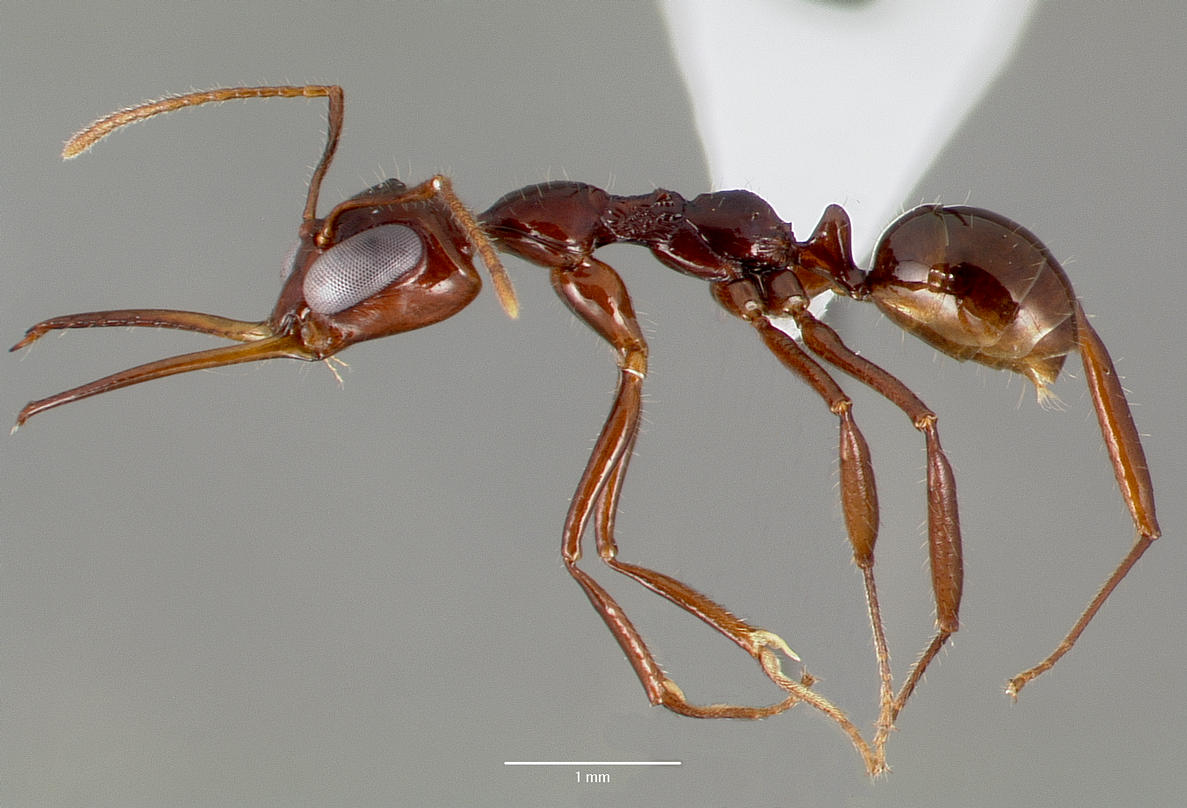
- Myrmoteras iriodum worker from Malaysia

Scientific classification
- Domain: Eukaryota
- Kingdom: Animalia
- Phylum: Arthropoda
- Class: Insecta
- Order: Hymenoptera
- Family: Formicidae
- Subfamily: Formicinae
- Tribe: Myrmoteratini; Emery, 1895
- Genus: Myrmoteras; Forel, 1893

Type species
- Myrmoteras binghamii Forel, 1893

Diversity
- 41 species

= Myrmoteras =

Genus of ants

Myrmoteras is a genus of ants in the subfamily Formicinae and the sole member of the tribe Myrmoteratini. They have enormous eyes, a character found in other ancient genera, and extremely elongated mandibles with eight to 16 teeth. These work as trap-jaws and can open up to 270°.

== Description ==
Trap-jawed ants: Strumigenys, Daceton, Odontomachus, Anochetus, Myrmoteras

While the elongated mandibles look superficially similar to those of the basal Myrmecia, the mechanism is, as a whole, totally dissimilar and is rather convergent to that of the ponerine genera Anochetus and Odontomachus, and the myrmicine Strumigenys. The trigger mechanism of the trap-jaw-like mandibles of Myrmoteras consists of two hairs. Other trap-jawed genera are Daceton, Acanthognathus, Orectognathus, Microdaceton, and Epitritus.

== Distribution ==
Myrmoteras occurs in the Indo-Malayan region.

== Species ==
- Myrmoteras arcoelinae Agosti, 1992
- Myrmoteras bakeri Wheeler, 1919 — Borneo
- Myrmoteras barbouri Creighton, 1930 — Java
- Myrmoteras baslerorum Agosti, 1992
- Myrmoteras binghamii Forel, 1893 — Burma
- Myrmoteras brachygnathum Moffett, 1985
- Myrmoteras brigitteae Agosti, 1992
- Myrmoteras ceylonicum Gregg, 1957 — Sri Lanka
- Myrmoteras chondrogastrum Moffett, 1985
- Myrmoteras concolor Bui, Eguchi & Yamane, 2013
- Myrmoteras cuneonodum Xu, 1998
- Myrmoteras danieli Agosti, 1992
- Myrmoteras diastematum Moffett, 1985
- Myrmoteras donisthorpei Wheeler, 1916 — Borneo
- Myrmoteras elfeorum Agosti, 1992
- Myrmoteras estrudae Agosti, 1992
- Myrmoteras glabrum Zettel & Sorger, 2011
- Myrmoteras indicum Moffett, 1985
- Myrmoteras insulcatum Moffett, 1985
- Myrmoteras iriodum Moffett, 1985
- Myrmoteras ivani Agosti, 1992
- Myrmoteras jacquelinae Agosti, 1992
- Myrmoteras jaitrongi Bui, Eguchi & Yamane, 2013
- Myrmoteras karnyi Gregg, 1954
- Myrmoteras marianneae Agosti, 1992
- Myrmoteras maudeae Agosti, 1992
- Myrmoteras mcarthuri Zettel & Sorger, 2011
- Myrmoteras mjoebergi Creighton, 1930 — Borneo
- Myrmoteras morowali Moffett, 1985
- Myrmoteras namphuong Bui, Eguchi & Yamane, 2013
- Myrmoteras nicoletteae Agosti, 1992
- Myrmoteras opalinum Bui, Eguchi & Yamane, 2013
- Myrmoteras scabrum Moffett, 1985
- Myrmoteras susanneae Agosti, 1992
- Myrmoteras tomimasai Bui, Eguchi & Yamane, 2013
- Myrmoteras tonboli Agosti, 1992
- Myrmoteras toro Moffett, 1985
- Myrmoteras williamsi Wheeler, 1919 — Philippines
- Myrmoteras wolasi Moffett, 1985
