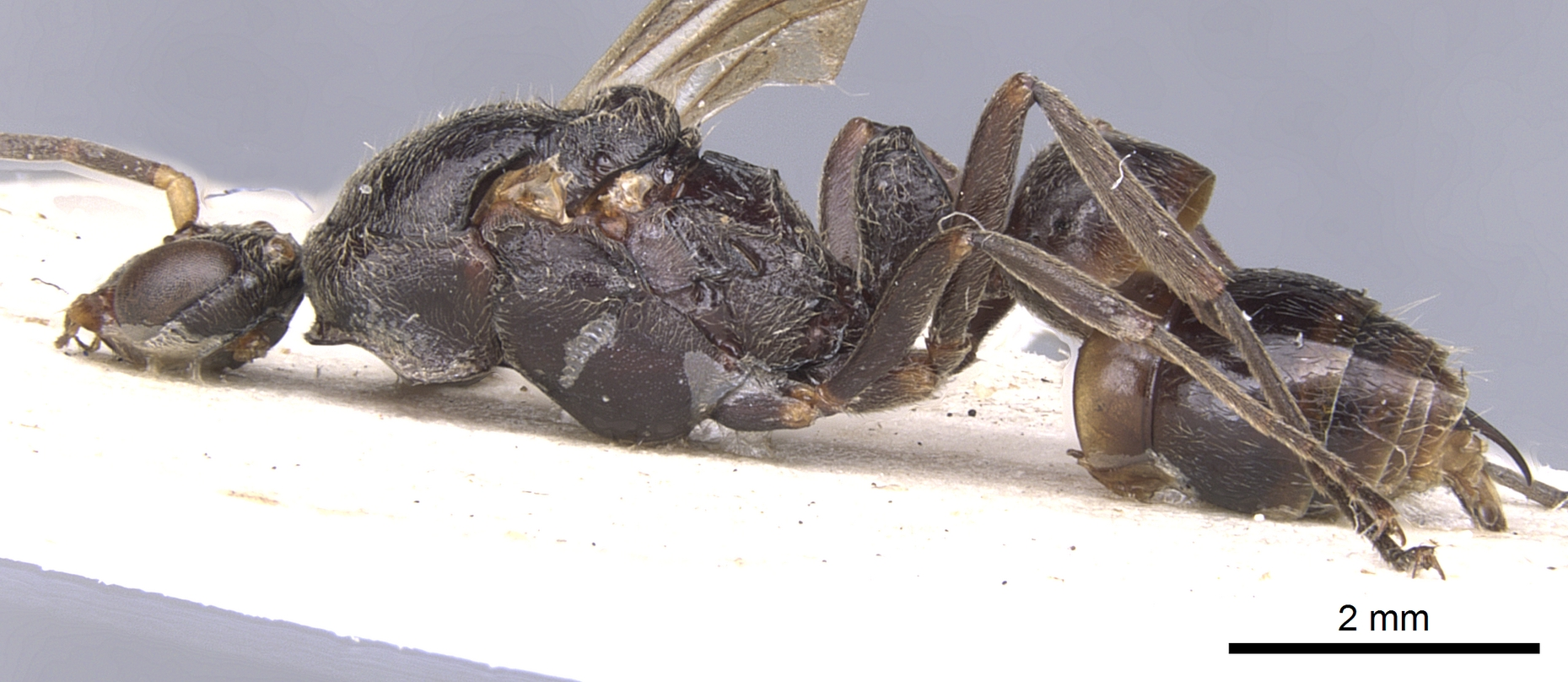
- Pseudoneoponera verecundae male

Scientific classification
- Kingdom: Animalia
- Phylum: Arthropoda
- Class: Insecta
- Order: Hymenoptera
- Family: Formicidae
- Subfamily: Ponerinae
- Tribe: Ponerini
- Genus: Pseudoneoponera; Donisthorpe, 1943

Type species
- Pseudoneoponera verecundae Donisthorpe, 1943

Diversity
- 18 species

Synonyms
- Trachymesopus Emery, 1911

= Pseudoneoponera =

Genus of ants

Pseudoneoponera is a ponerine genus of ants found from India to Australia, they are mostly queenless gamergate species, most of the species within the genus thrives on only gamergates.

== Species ==
- Pseudoneoponera barbata (Stitz, 1911)
- Pseudoneoponera bispinosa (Smith, F., 1858)
- Pseudoneoponera denticulata (Kirby, 1896)
- Pseudoneoponera dubitata (Forel, 1900)
- Pseudoneoponera excavata (Emery, 1893)
- Pseudoneoponera havilandi (Forel, 1901)
- Pseudoneoponera incisa (Emery, 1911)
- Pseudoneoponera insularis (Emery, 1889)
- Pseudoneoponera mayri (Emery, 1887)
- Pseudoneoponera obesa (Emery, 1897)
- Pseudoneoponera oculata (Smith, F., 1858)
- Pseudoneoponera piliventris (Smith, F., 1858)
- Pseudoneoponera porcata (Emery, 1897)
- Pseudoneoponera rufipes (Jerdon, 1851)
- Pseudoneoponera sandakana (Wheeler, 1919)
- Pseudoneoponera sublaevis (Emery, 1887)
- Pseudoneoponera tridentata (Smith, F., 1858)
- Pseudoneoponera verecundae Donisthorpe, 1943
- Pseudoneoponera vidua (Smith, 1857)
