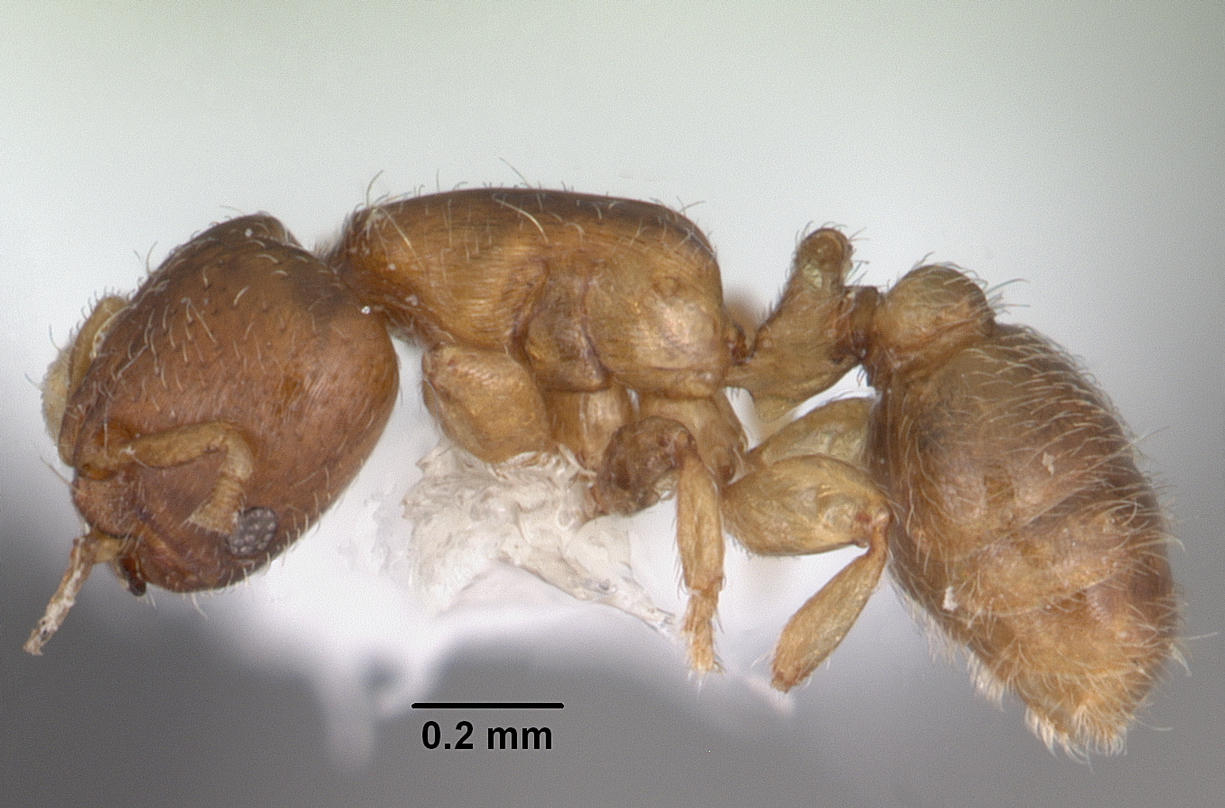
- Rhopalomastix rothneyi worker

Scientific classification
- Kingdom: Animalia
- Phylum: Arthropoda
- Class: Insecta
- Order: Hymenoptera
- Family: Formicidae
- Subfamily: Myrmicinae
- Tribe: Crematogastrini
- Alliance: Carebara genus group
- Genus: Rhopalomastix; Forel, 1900

Type species
- Rhopalomastix rothneyi Forel, 1900

Diversity
- 10 species

= Rhopalomastix =

Genus of ants

Rhopalomastix is a genus of ants in the subfamily Myrmicinae. It is restricted to the Oriental and Indo-Australian regions, where the ants nest under the bark of living trees.

== Species ==
- Rhopalomastix escherichi Forel, 1911
- Rhopalomastix glabricephala Wang, Yong & Jaitrong, 2018
- Rhopalomastix janeti Donisthorpe, 1936
- Rhopalomastix mazu Terayama, 2009
- Rhopalomastix murphyi Wang, Yong & Jaitrong, 2018
- Rhopalomastix omotoensis Terayama, 1996
- Rhopalomastix rothneyi Forel, 1900
- Rhopalomastix striata Wang, Yong & Jaitrong, 2018
- Rhopalomastix tenebra Wang, Yong & Jaitrong, 2018
- Rhopalomastix umbracapita Xu, 1999
