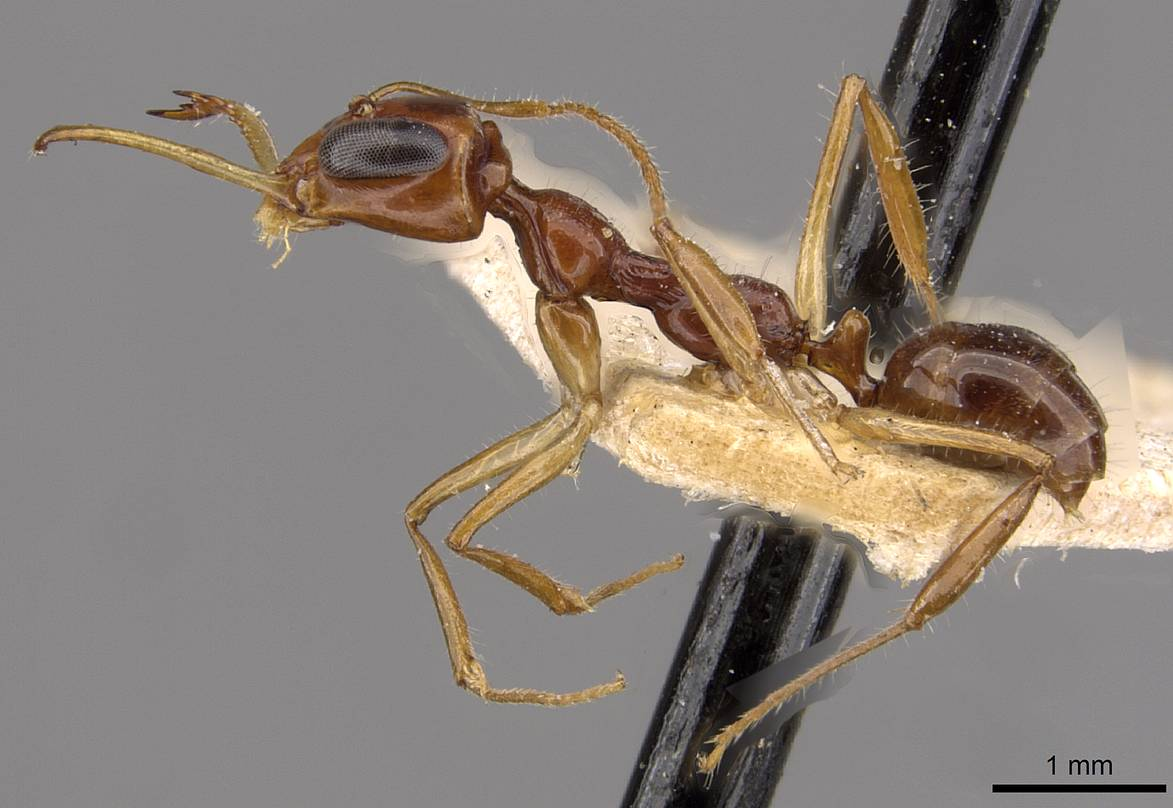

Scientific classification
- Kingdom: Animalia
- Phylum: Arthropoda
- Clade: Pancrustacea
- Class: Insecta
- Order: Hymenoptera
- Family: Formicidae
- Subfamily: Formicinae
- Genus: Myrmoteras
- Species: M. binghamii

Binomial name
- Myrmoteras binghamii Forel, 1893

= Myrmoteras binghamii =

Species of ant

Myrmoteras binghamii is a species of ant in the subfamily Formicinae. It is found in Myanmar, and Thailand.
