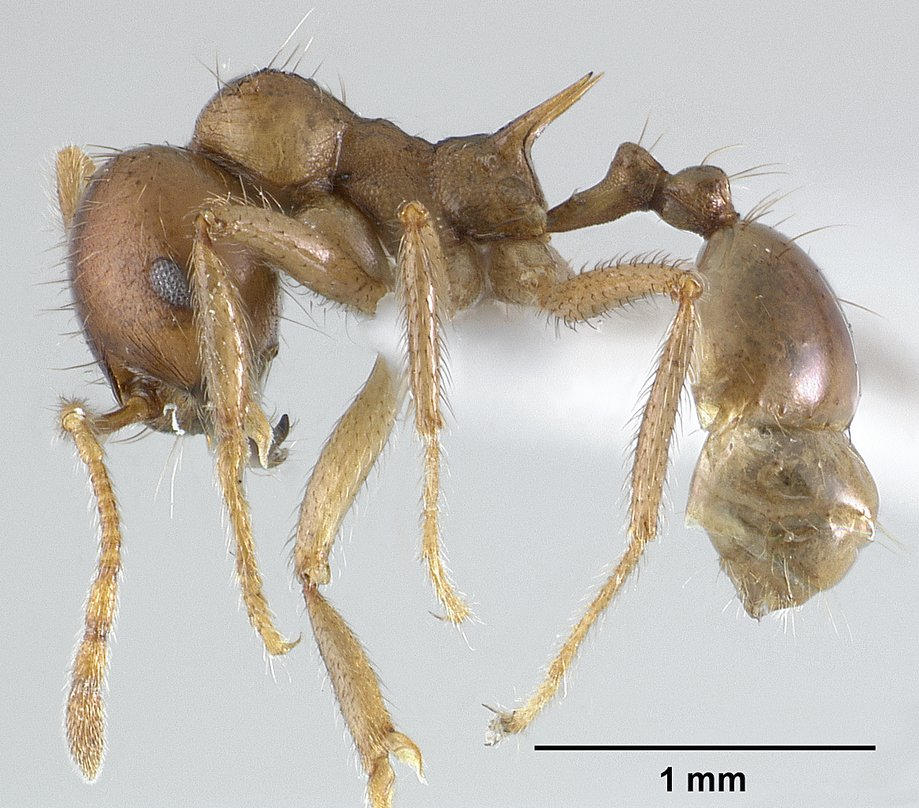
- Lophomyrmex longicornis worker

Scientific classification
- Kingdom: Animalia
- Phylum: Arthropoda
- Class: Insecta
- Order: Hymenoptera
- Family: Formicidae
- Subfamily: Myrmicinae
- Tribe: Crematogastrini
- Alliance: Podomyrma genus group
- Genus: Lophomyrmex; Emery, 1892

Type species
- Oecodoma quadrispinosa

Diversity
- 13 species

= Lophomyrmex =

Genus of ants

Lophomyrmex is a genus of ants in the subfamily Myrmicinae. It is known from the Oriental and Indo-Australian regions.

== Species ==
- Lophomyrmex ambiguus Rigato, 1994
- Lophomyrmex bedoti Emery, 1893
- Lophomyrmex birmanus Emery, 1893
- Lophomyrmex changlangensis Sheela & Ghosh, 2008
- Lophomyrmex indosinensis Yamane & Hosoishi, 2015
- Lophomyrmex kali Rigato, 1994
- Lophomyrmex longicornis Rigato, 1994
- Lophomyrmex lucidus Menozzi, 1930
- Lophomyrmex opaciceps Viehmeyer, 1922
- Lophomyrmex quadrispinosus (Jerdon, 1851)
- Lophomyrmex striatulus Rigato, 1994
- Lophomyrmex taivanae Forel, 1912
- Lophomyrmex terraceensis Bharti & Kumar, 2012
