= Leptogenys peuqueti =

Scientific classification
- Kingdom: Animalia
- Phylum: Arthropoda
- Clade: Pancrustacea
- Class: Insecta
- Order: Hymenoptera
- Family: Formicidae
- Genus: Leptogenys
- Species: L. peuqueti

Binomial name
- Leptogenys peuqueti (André, 1887)

Species of ant

Leptogenys peuqueti is a species of ant of the subfamily Ponerinae. It is found in India, Sri Lanka, China, Vietnam, and Philippines.
