= Parasyscia luteoviger =

Scientific classification
- Kingdom: Animalia
- Phylum: Arthropoda
- Clade: Pancrustacea
- Class: Insecta
- Order: Hymenoptera
- Family: Formicidae
- Genus: Parasyscia
- Species: P. luteoviger

Binomial name
- Parasyscia luteoviger (Brown, 1975)

Synonyms
- Cerapachys luteoviger

Species of ant

Parasyscia luteoviger is a species of reddish-brown army ant found in Sri Lanka.
