= Camponotus sesquipedalis =

Scientific classification
- Kingdom: Animalia
- Phylum: Arthropoda
- Clade: Pancrustacea
- Class: Insecta
- Order: Hymenoptera
- Family: Formicidae
- Subfamily: Formicinae
- Genus: Camponotus
- Subgenus: Tanaemyrmex
- Species: C. sesquipedalis

Binomial name
- Camponotus sesquipedalis Roger, 1863

Species of ant

Camponotus sesquipedalis is a species of carpenter ant. It is found in Sri Lanka.
