= Camponotus albipes =

Scientific classification
- Kingdom: Animalia
- Phylum: Arthropoda
- Clade: Pancrustacea
- Class: Insecta
- Order: Hymenoptera
- Family: Formicidae
- Subfamily: Formicinae
- Genus: Camponotus
- Subgenus: Myrmamblys
- Species: C. albipes

Binomial name
- Camponotus albipes Emery, 1893

Species of ant

Camponotus albipes is a species of carpenter ant in the subfamily Formicinae. It is found in Sri Lanka.

Camponotus albipes workers measure about 3.5 mm (0.14 in) in length.
