= Paratopula ceylonica =

Scientific classification
- Kingdom: Animalia
- Phylum: Arthropoda
- Clade: Pancrustacea
- Class: Insecta
- Order: Hymenoptera
- Family: Formicidae
- Subfamily: Myrmicinae
- Genus: Paratopula
- Species: P. ceylonica

Binomial name
- Paratopula ceylonica (Emery, 1901)

Synonyms
- Leptothorax taylori Forel, 1902

Species of ant

Paratopula ceylonica is a species of ant in the subfamily Myrmicinae found in the Philippines, India, Bangladesh, Sri Lanka, and China.
