= Camponotus latebrosus =

Scientific classification
- Kingdom: Animalia
- Phylum: Arthropoda
- Clade: Pancrustacea
- Class: Insecta
- Order: Hymenoptera
- Family: Formicidae
- Subfamily: Formicinae
- Genus: Camponotus
- Subgenus: Tanaemyrmex
- Species: C. latebrosus

Binomial name
- Camponotus latebrosus (Walker, 1859)

Synonyms
- Formica latebrosa Walker, 1859

Species of ant

Camponotus latebrosus is a species of carpenter ant in the subfamily Formicinae. It is found in Sri Lanka.
