= Ants of Sri Lanka (book) =

- Author: R.K. Sriyani Dias
- Language: English
- Genre: Non-fiction
- Publisher: Sarvodaya Vishva Lekha
- Publication date: 2002
- Publication place: Sri Lanka
- Media type: Print
- Pages: 44 pp
- ISBN: 955-599-296-7

Ants of Sri Lanka by R.K. Sriyani Dias is a zoology book about all the ant species in Sri Lanka. This is the first complete zoological book ever published in Sri Lanka after about 100 years, about ants. During the past decades, the taxonomic evidences about ants of Sri Lanka is full of doubts due to misidentification of various species and placement of them into various genera and subfamilies. At present, this book is the only publication about ants within Sri Lanka, which was published after Bingham's ant publication on 1903 on island.

Dr. R.K. Sriyani Dias is the first myrmecologist in Sri Lanka, which experimented and revealed the hidden information of Sri Lankan ant diversity. She works as a senior lecturer in Zoology of University of Kelaniya. She has conducted research throughout the country to document all recorded ant species known to live in Sri Lanka. Dr. Dias is the first person to undergo extensive biological nature about Sri Lanka endemic ant species - Aneuretus simoni. She also has kept many ant specimens at the National Museum of Colombo and Department of Zoology in the University of Kelaniya.

The book describes all the ant species recorded in Sri Lanka known up to date, with 125+ species, both terrestrial and fossorial. The book also highlight major ants in Sri Lanka with microscopic and hand drawings. It features about many aspects of myrmecology, such as identification of an ant from other insects, general life cycle of ant, taxonomically important morphological features of worker ants. It also lists several different field and laboratory methods for studying ants.

The foreword of the book was written by Prof. Seiki Yamane, another myrmecologist. During his forward, he stated that:

"It can be said that now Sri Lanka has an active ant researcher who is expected to clarify the entire ant fauna of the country. For this goal to be achieved, the networking of Sri Lankan entomologists interested in ant study, and corporation with myrmecologists outside the country, particularly of India, may be indispensable. I (Yamane) hope this book will inspire native scientists to start studying these fascinating creatures."

After this book, Prof. Dias completed much advanced, scientific record for ants of Sri Lanka, first published by Biodiversity Secretariat of Sri Lanka in 2014 with 273 pages. This has much focused on their biology, identifying keys, full details of each subfamily and relevant updated classifications and photographs.
