= Myrmica pilinodis =

Scientific classification
- Kingdom: Animalia
- Phylum: Arthropoda
- Clade: Pancrustacea
- Class: Insecta
- Order: Hymenoptera
- Family: Formicidae
- Subfamily: Myrmicinae
- Genus: Myrmica
- Species: M. pilinodis

Binomial name
- Myrmica pilinodis Motschoulsky, 1863

Species of ant

Myrmica pilinodis is a species of ant of the subfamily Myrmicinae. It is found in Sri Lanka.
