= Crematogaster brunnescens =

Scientific classification
- Kingdom: Animalia
- Phylum: Arthropoda
- Clade: Pancrustacea
- Class: Insecta
- Order: Hymenoptera
- Family: Formicidae
- Subfamily: Myrmicinae
- Genus: Crematogaster
- Species: C. brunnescens

Binomial name
- Crematogaster brunnescens Motschoulsky, 1863

Species of ant

Crematogaster brunnescens is a species of ant in the tribe Crematogastrini. It was first described by Motschoulsky in 1863. The species is endemic to Sri Lanka.
