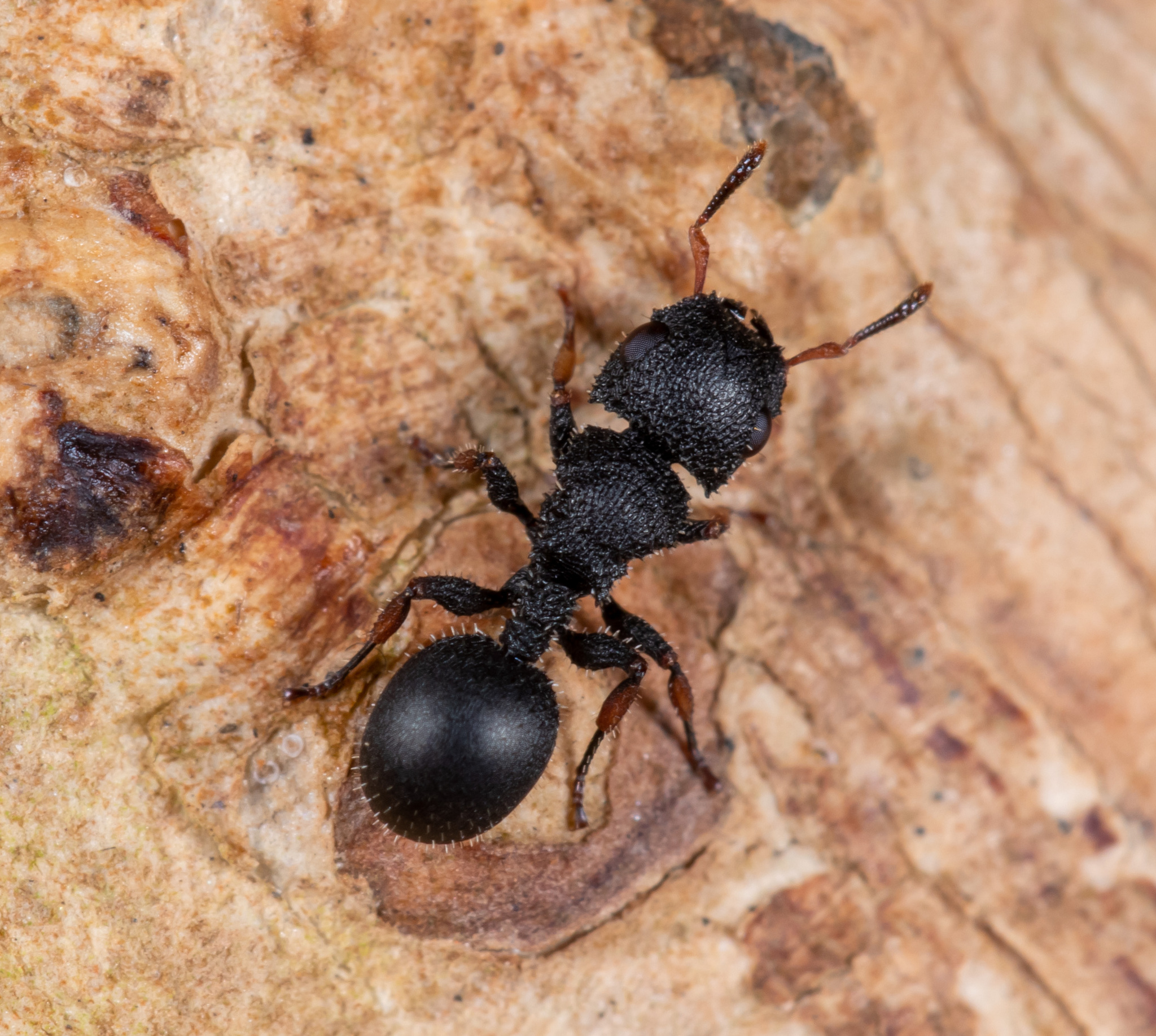
- C. granulatus from Thailand

Scientific classification
- Kingdom: Animalia
- Phylum: Arthropoda
- Clade: Pancrustacea
- Class: Insecta
- Order: Hymenoptera
- Family: Formicidae
- Subfamily: Myrmicinae
- Genus: Cataulacus
- Species: C. granulatus

Binomial name
- Cataulacus granulatus (Latreille, 1802)

Synonyms
- Cataulacus hispidus Smith, F., 1876

= Cataulacus granulatus =

Species of ant

Cataulacus granulatus, is a species of ant of the subfamily Myrmicinae, which is a widespread species that can be found from Borneo, China, India, Indonesia, Malaysia, Myanmar, Nepal, Thailand, Singapore, and Sri Lanka.
