= Crematogaster apicalis =

Scientific classification
- Kingdom: Animalia
- Phylum: Arthropoda
- Class: Insecta
- Order: Hymenoptera
- Family: Formicidae
- Subfamily: Myrmicinae
- Genus: Crematogaster
- Species: C. apicalis

Binomial name
- Crematogaster apicalis Motschoulsky, 1878

Species of ant

Crematogaster apicalis is a species of ant in tribe Crematogastrini. It was described by Motschoulsky in 1878. The species is endemic to Sri Lanka.
