= Myrmica obscurata =

Scientific classification
- Kingdom: Animalia
- Phylum: Arthropoda
- Clade: Pancrustacea
- Class: Insecta
- Order: Hymenoptera
- Family: Formicidae
- Subfamily: Myrmicinae
- Genus: Myrmica
- Species: M. obscurata

Binomial name
- Myrmica obscurata Motschoulsky, 1863

Species of ant

Myrmica obscurata is a species of ant of the genus Myrmica. It is found in Sri Lanka.
