= Parasyscia fossulata =

Scientific classification
- Kingdom: Animalia
- Phylum: Arthropoda
- Clade: Pancrustacea
- Class: Insecta
- Order: Hymenoptera
- Family: Formicidae
- Genus: Parasyscia
- Species: P. fossulata

Binomial name
- Parasyscia fossulata (Forel, 1895)

Synonyms
- Cerapachys fossulatus

Species of ant

Parasyscia fossulata is a species of reddish-brown army ant found in Sri Lanka and China.
