= Dilobocondyla didita =

Scientific classification
- Kingdom: Animalia
- Phylum: Arthropoda
- Clade: Pancrustacea
- Class: Insecta
- Order: Hymenoptera
- Family: Formicidae
- Subfamily: Myrmicinae
- Genus: Dilobocondyla
- Species: D. didita

Binomial name
- Dilobocondyla didita (Walker, 1859)

Synonyms
- Atopomyrmex escherichi Forel, 1911

Species of ant

Dilobocondyla didita is a species of ant in the subfamily Myrmicinae that can be found in Sri Lanka.
