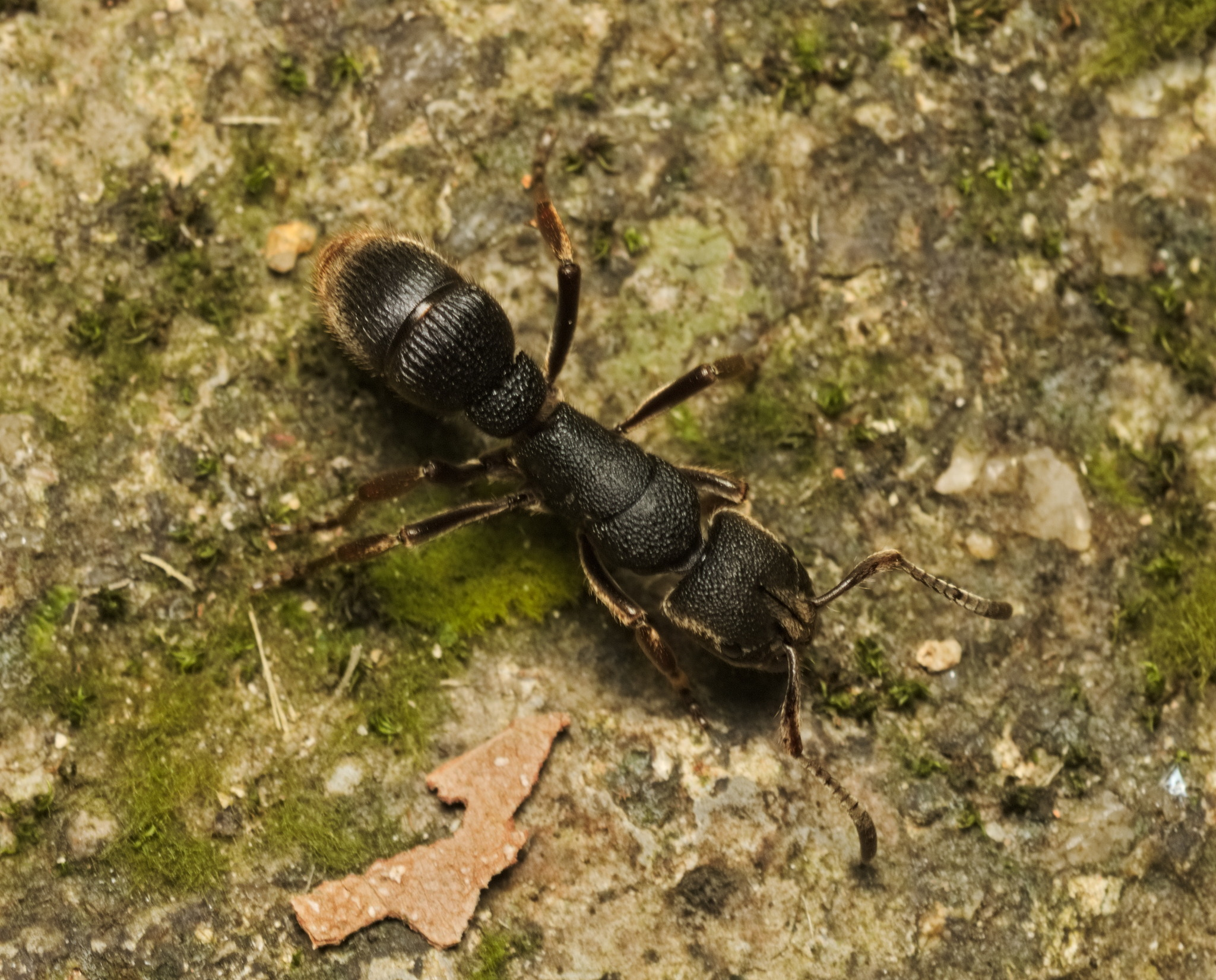

Scientific classification
- Kingdom: Animalia
- Phylum: Arthropoda
- Clade: Pancrustacea
- Class: Insecta
- Order: Hymenoptera
- Family: Formicidae
- Genus: Pseudoneoponera
- Species: P. rufipes

Binomial name
- Pseudoneoponera rufipes (Jerdon, 1851)

= Pseudoneoponera rufipes =

Species of ant

Pseudoneoponera rufipes is a species of ant of the subfamily Ponerinae. It is found in southern and eastern Asia. Like other ants in the genus, they extrude a foam when disturbed.

Ant releasing strings of foam

== Subspecies ==
- Pseudoneoponera rufipes ceylonensis (Jerdon, 1851) - Sri Lanka
- Pseudoneoponera rufipes rufipes Forel, 1911 - India, Nepal, Thailand, Vietnam, China
