= Calyptomyrmex tamil =

Scientific classification
- Kingdom: Animalia
- Phylum: Arthropoda
- Clade: Pancrustacea
- Class: Insecta
- Order: Hymenoptera
- Family: Formicidae
- Subfamily: Myrmicinae
- Genus: Calyptomyrmex
- Species: C. tamil

Binomial name
- Calyptomyrmex tamil Baroni Urbani, 1975

Species of ant

Calyptomyrmex tamil is a species of ant in the subfamily Myrmicinae, which can be found in Sri Lanka.
