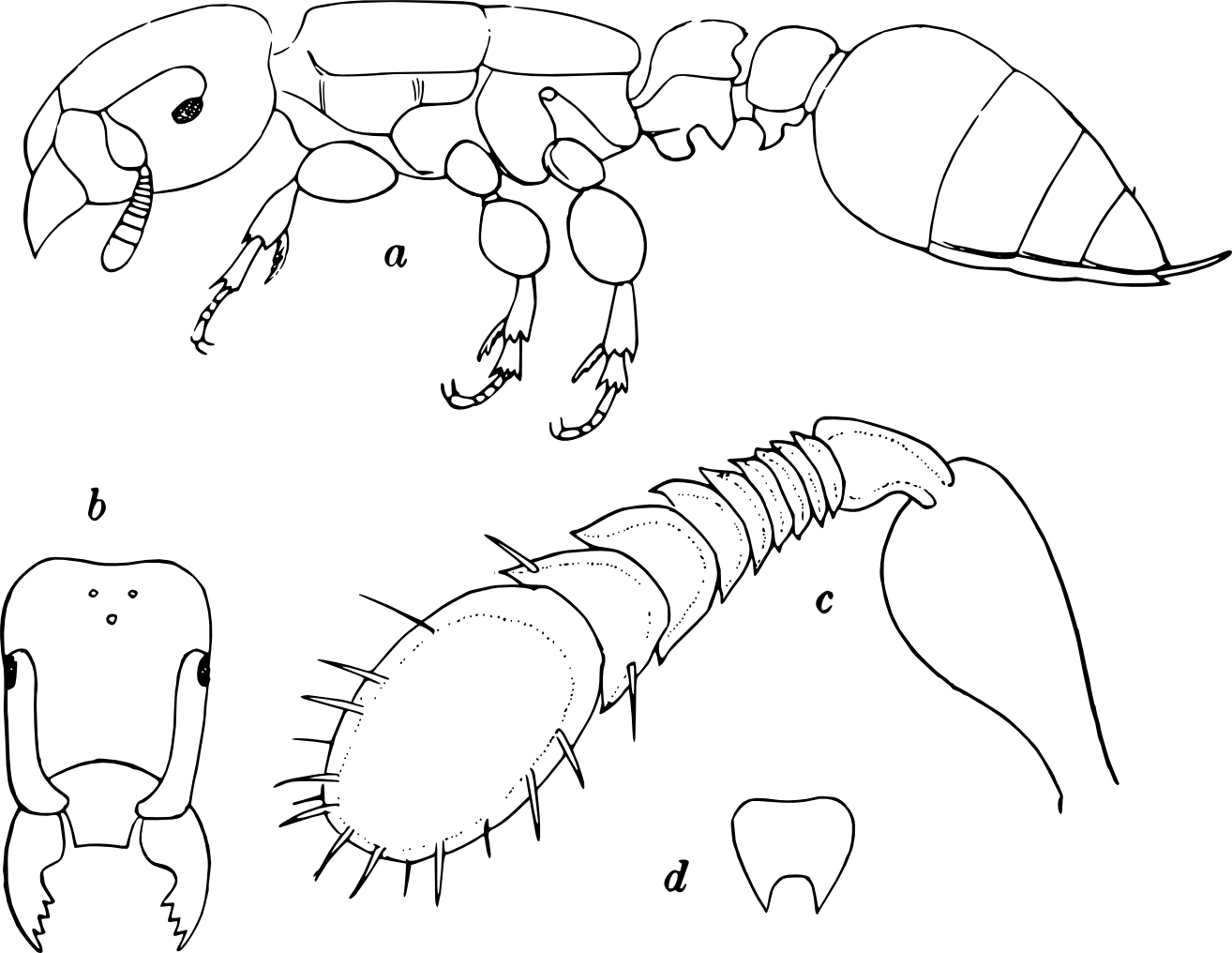

Scientific classification
- Kingdom: Animalia
- Phylum: Arthropoda
- Clade: Pancrustacea
- Class: Insecta
- Order: Hymenoptera
- Family: Formicidae
- Subfamily: Myrmicinae
- Genus: Metapone
- Species: M. greeni

Binomial name
- Metapone greeni Forel, 1911

= Metapone greeni =

Species of ant

Metapone greeni is a species of ant of the subfamily Myrmicinae which can be found in Sri Lanka.
