= Camponotus simoni =

Scientific classification
- Kingdom: Animalia
- Phylum: Arthropoda
- Clade: Pancrustacea
- Class: Insecta
- Order: Hymenoptera
- Family: Formicidae
- Subfamily: Formicinae
- Genus: Camponotus
- Subgenus: Tanaemyrmex
- Species: C. simoni

Binomial name
- Camponotus simoni Emery, 1893

Species of ant

Camponotus simoni is a species of carpenter ant (genus Camponotus). It is found from Sri Lanka. Its kingdom is Animalia (phylum: Arthropoda) and its class is Insecta.
