= Rhopalomastix escherichi =

Scientific classification
- Kingdom: Animalia
- Phylum: Arthropoda
- Clade: Pancrustacea
- Class: Insecta
- Order: Hymenoptera
- Family: Formicidae
- Subfamily: Myrmicinae
- Genus: Rhopalomastix
- Species: R. escherichi

Binomial name
- Rhopalomastix escherichi Forel, 1911

Species of ant

Rhopalomastix escherichi is a species of ant of the subfamily Myrmicinae that can be found in Sri Lanka.
