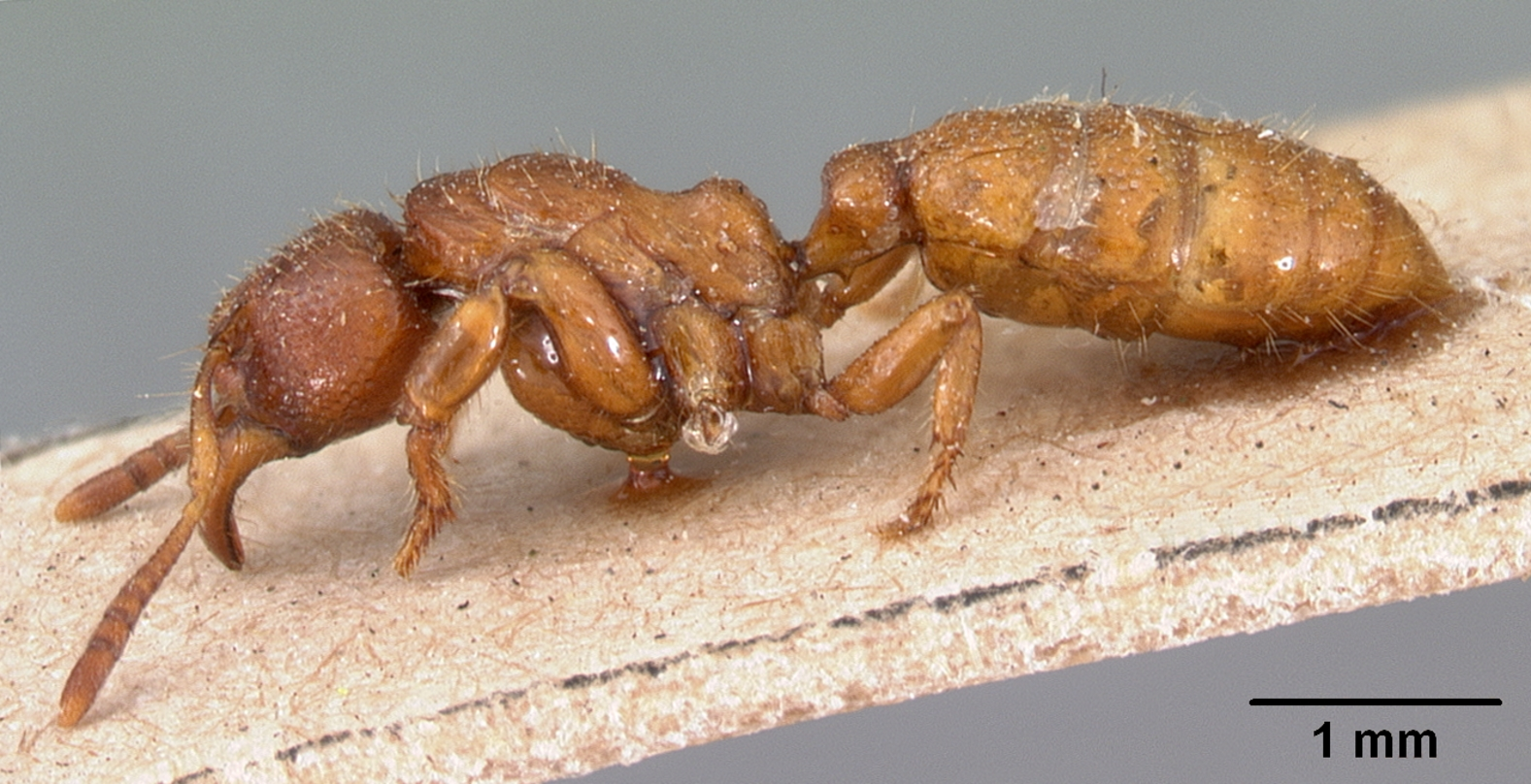

Scientific classification
- Kingdom: Animalia
- Phylum: Arthropoda
- Clade: Pancrustacea
- Class: Insecta
- Order: Hymenoptera
- Family: Formicidae
- Genus: Centromyrmex
- Species: C. feae

Binomial name
- Centromyrmex feae (Emery, 1889)

Synonyms
- Centromyrmex donisthorpei Menozzi, 1925

= Centromyrmex feae =

Species of ant

Centromyrmex feae, is a species of ant of the subfamily Ponerinae. There are 3 subspecies recognized.

== Subspecies ==
- Centromyrmex feae ceylonicus Forel, 1900 - Sri Lanka
- Centromyrmex feae greeni Forel, 1901 - Singapore
- Centromyrmex feae feae (Emery, 1889) - Philippines, Cambodia, India, Myanmar, Taiwan, Thailand, Vietnam, China
