= Leptogenys exudans =

Scientific classification
- Kingdom: Animalia
- Phylum: Arthropoda
- Clade: Pancrustacea
- Class: Insecta
- Order: Hymenoptera
- Family: Formicidae
- Genus: Leptogenys
- Species: L. exudans

Binomial name
- Leptogenys exudans (Walker, 1859)

Species of ant

Leptogenys exudans is a species of ant of the subfamily Ponerinae. It is found in Sri Lanka.
