= Myrmoteras ceylonicum =

Scientific classification
- Kingdom: Animalia
- Phylum: Arthropoda
- Clade: Pancrustacea
- Class: Insecta
- Order: Hymenoptera
- Family: Formicidae
- Subfamily: Formicinae
- Genus: Myrmoteras
- Species: M. ceylonicum

Binomial name
- Myrmoteras ceylonicum Gregg, 1957

Species of ant

Myrmoteras ceylonicum is a species of ant in the subfamily Formicinae. It is found in Sri Lanka.
