= Bothroponera tesseronoda =

Scientific classification
- Kingdom: Animalia
- Phylum: Arthropoda
- Clade: Pancrustacea
- Class: Insecta
- Order: Hymenoptera
- Family: Formicidae
- Genus: Bothroponera
- Species: B. tesseronoda

Binomial name
- Bothroponera tesseronoda (Emery, 1877)

Species of ant

Bothroponera tesseronoda is a species of ant of the subfamily Ponerinae, which can be found from India, and Sri Lanka.
