= Polyrhachis oedipus =

Scientific classification
- Kingdom: Animalia
- Phylum: Arthropoda
- Clade: Pancrustacea
- Class: Insecta
- Order: Hymenoptera
- Family: Formicidae
- Subfamily: Formicinae
- Genus: Polyrhachis
- Subgenus: Myrmhopla
- Species: P. oedipus

Binomial name
- Polyrhachis oedipus Forel, 1893

Species of ant

Polyrhachis oedipus is a species of ant in the subfamily Formicinae, found in Sri Lanka. They are known to be diurnal.
