= Cataulacus simoni =

Scientific classification
- Kingdom: Animalia
- Phylum: Arthropoda
- Clade: Pancrustacea
- Class: Insecta
- Order: Hymenoptera
- Family: Formicidae
- Subfamily: Myrmicinae
- Genus: Cataulacus
- Species: C. simoni

Binomial name
- Cataulacus simoni Emery, 1893

Synonyms
- Cataulacus granulatus andamanensis Forel, 1903

Species of ant

Cataulacus simoni, is a species of ant of the subfamily Myrmicinae, which is a widespread species that can be found from China, India, and Sri Lanka.
