= Metapone johni =

Scientific classification
- Kingdom: Animalia
- Phylum: Arthropoda
- Clade: Pancrustacea
- Class: Insecta
- Order: Hymenoptera
- Family: Formicidae
- Subfamily: Myrmicinae
- Genus: Metapone
- Species: M. johni

Binomial name
- Metapone johni Karavaiev, 1933

Species of ant

Metapone johni is a species of ant of the subfamily Myrmicinae, which can be found from Sri Lanka.
