= Lophomyrmex quadrispinosus =

Scientific classification
- Kingdom: Animalia
- Phylum: Arthropoda
- Clade: Pancrustacea
- Class: Insecta
- Order: Hymenoptera
- Family: Formicidae
- Subfamily: Myrmicinae
- Genus: Lophomyrmex
- Species: L. quadrispinosus

Binomial name
- Lophomyrmex quadrispinosus (Jerdon, 1851)

Synonyms
- Lophomyrmex quadrispinosus taprobanae Forel, 1911

Species of ant

Lophomyrmex quadrispinosus is a species of ant in the subfamily Formicinae. It is found in India, Sri Lanka, China, and Israel.
