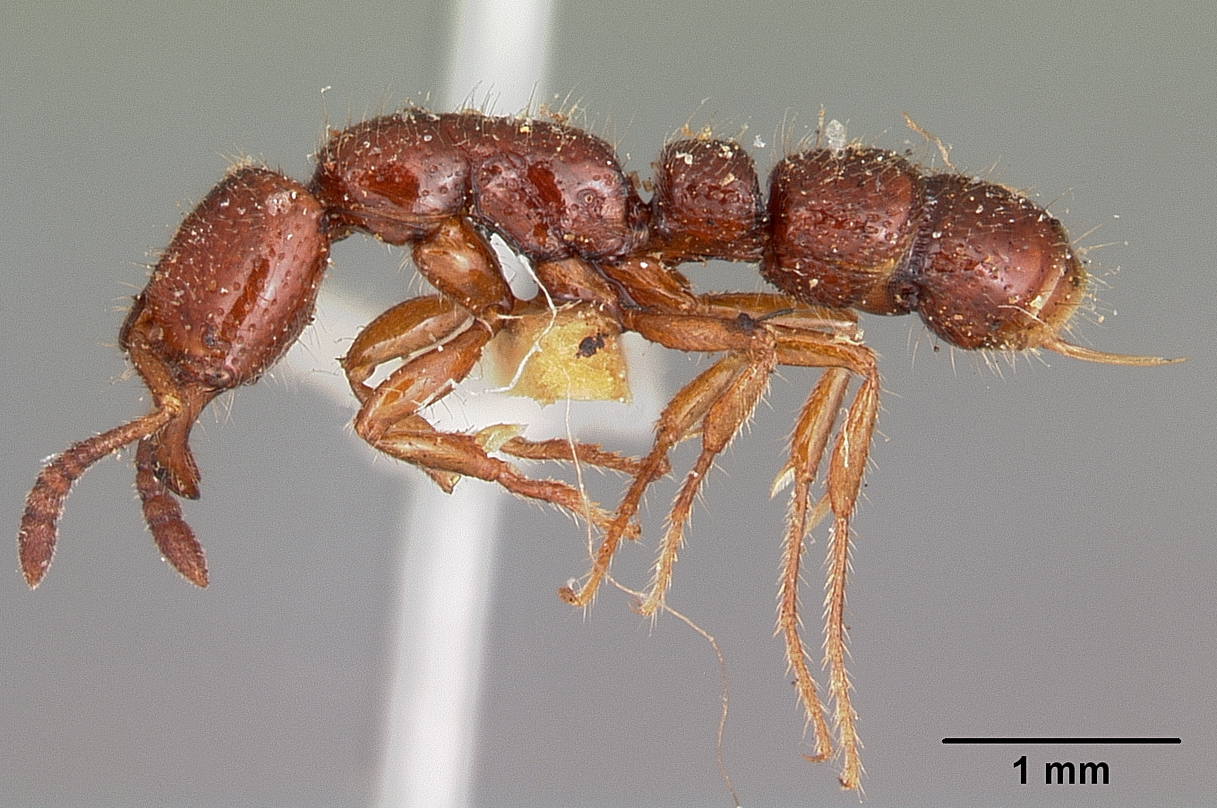
- Profile

Scientific classification
- Kingdom: Animalia
- Phylum: Arthropoda
- Clade: Pancrustacea
- Class: Insecta
- Order: Hymenoptera
- Family: Formicidae
- Genus: Myopias
- Species: M. amblyops

Binomial name
- Myopias amblyops Roger, 1861

= Myopias amblyops =

Species of ant

Myopias amblyops, is a species of ant of the subfamily Ponerinae. It is found in Sri Lanka.
