= Cataulacus taprobanae =

Scientific classification
- Kingdom: Animalia
- Phylum: Arthropoda
- Clade: Pancrustacea
- Class: Insecta
- Order: Hymenoptera
- Family: Formicidae
- Subfamily: Myrmicinae
- Genus: Cataulacus
- Species: C. taprobanae

Binomial name
- Cataulacus taprobanae Smith, F., 1853

Species of ant

Cataulacus taprobanae is a species of ant of the subfamily Myrmicinae. It is a widespread species that can be found in Sri Lanka, India, and China.
