= Camponotus auriculatus =

Scientific classification
- Kingdom: Animalia
- Phylum: Arthropoda
- Clade: Pancrustacea
- Class: Insecta
- Order: Hymenoptera
- Family: Formicidae
- Subfamily: Formicinae
- Genus: Camponotus
- Subgenus: Myrmamblys
- Species: C. auriculatus

Binomial name
- Camponotus auriculatus Mayr, 1897

Species of ant

Camponotus auriculatus is a species of carpenter ant in the subfamily Formicinae. It is found in Sri Lanka.
