= Camponotus greeni =

Scientific classification
- Kingdom: Animalia
- Phylum: Arthropoda
- Clade: Pancrustacea
- Class: Insecta
- Order: Hymenoptera
- Family: Formicidae
- Subfamily: Formicinae
- Genus: Camponotus
- Subgenus: Myrmamblys
- Species: C. greeni

Binomial name
- Camponotus greeni Forel, 1911

Species of ant

Camponotus greeni is a species of carpenter ant (genus Camponotus). It is found in Sri Lanka.
