= List of ants of Thailand =

This article contains a list of ants of Thailand from Khachonpisitsak et al. (2020).

Khachonpisitsak et al. (2020) report 529 ant species and subspecies in 109 genera for Thailand. These belong to 10 different subfamilies. Thailand is the type locality for 81 species.

An earlier comprehensive checklist of ant species of Thailand can be found in Jaitrong & Nabhitabhata (2005).

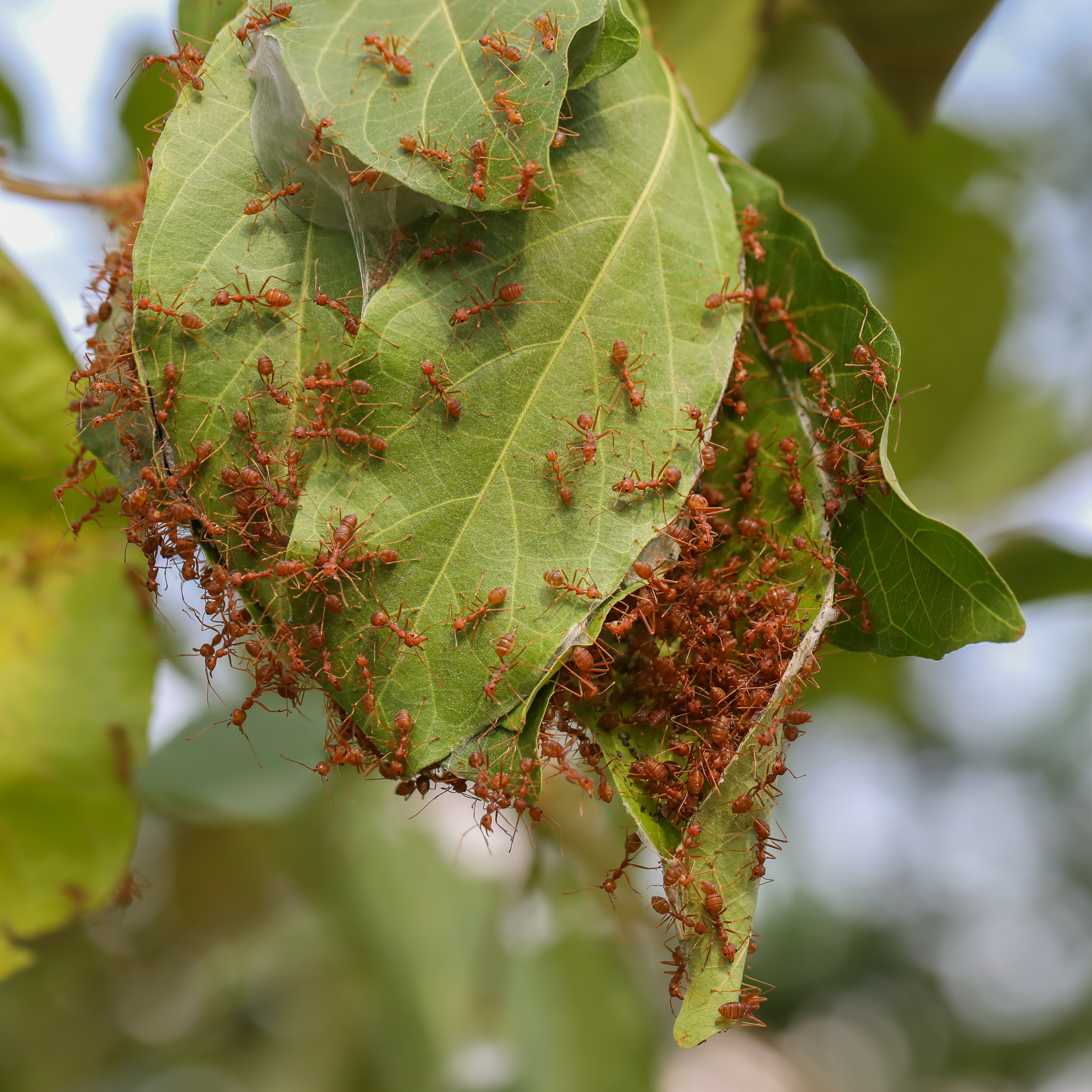
Oecophylla smaragdina weaver ant nest

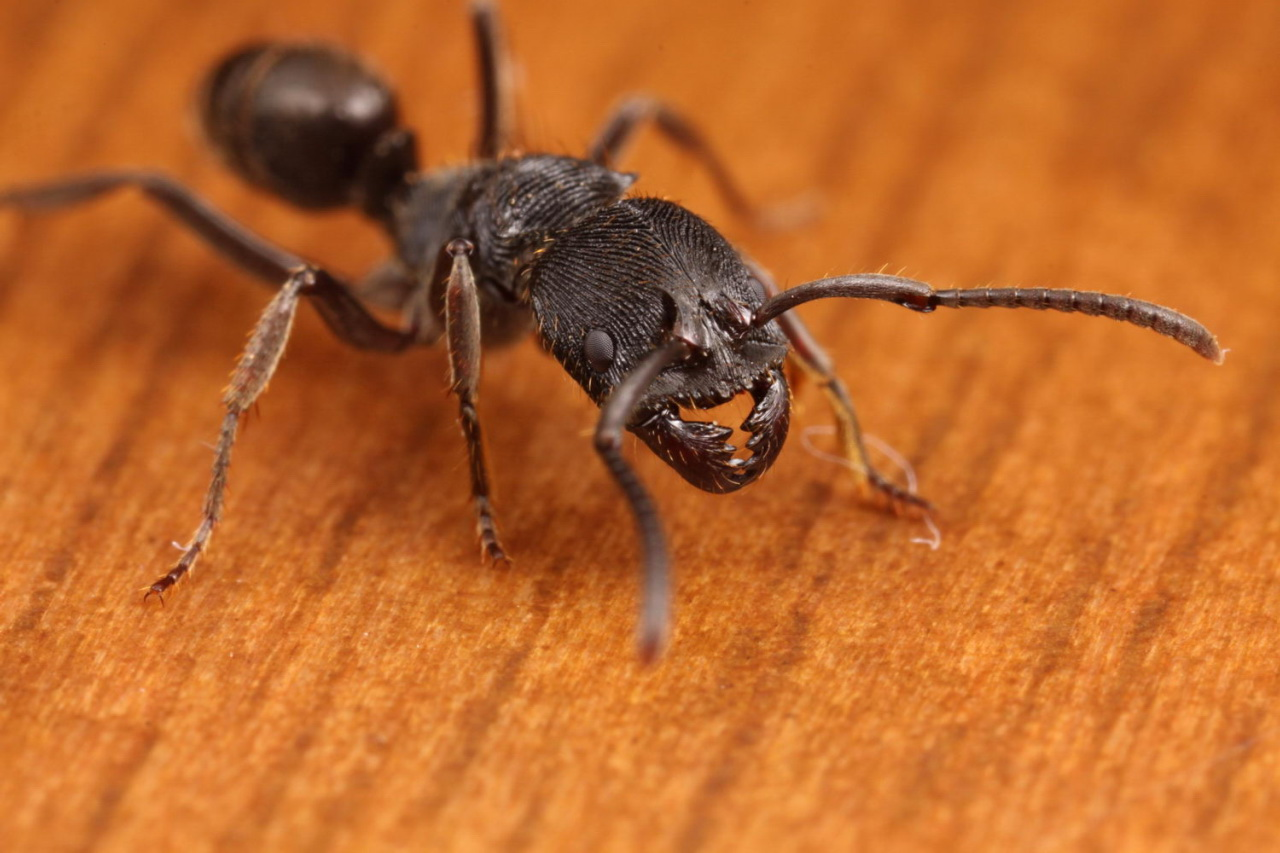
Odontoponera sp.

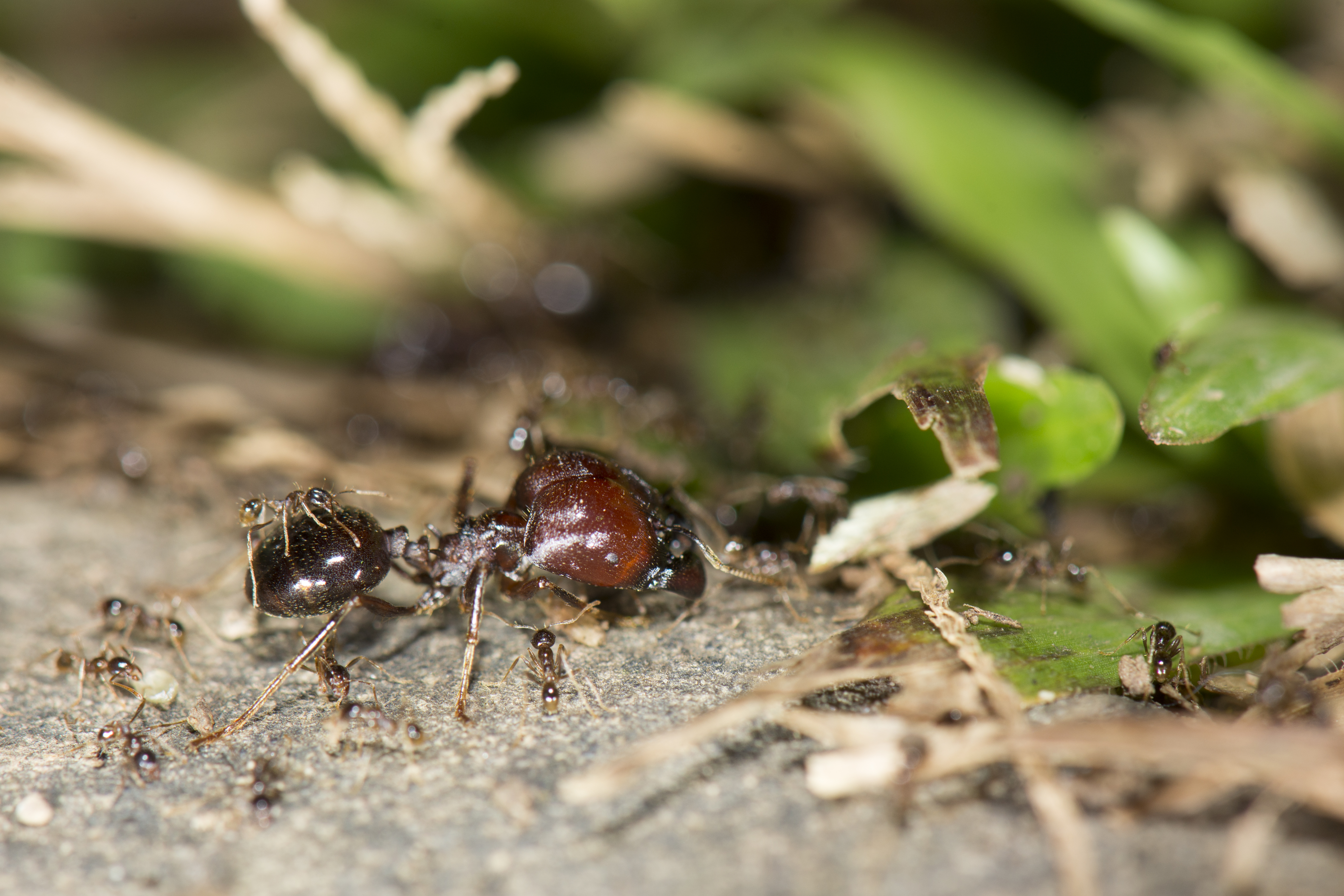
Carebara diversa

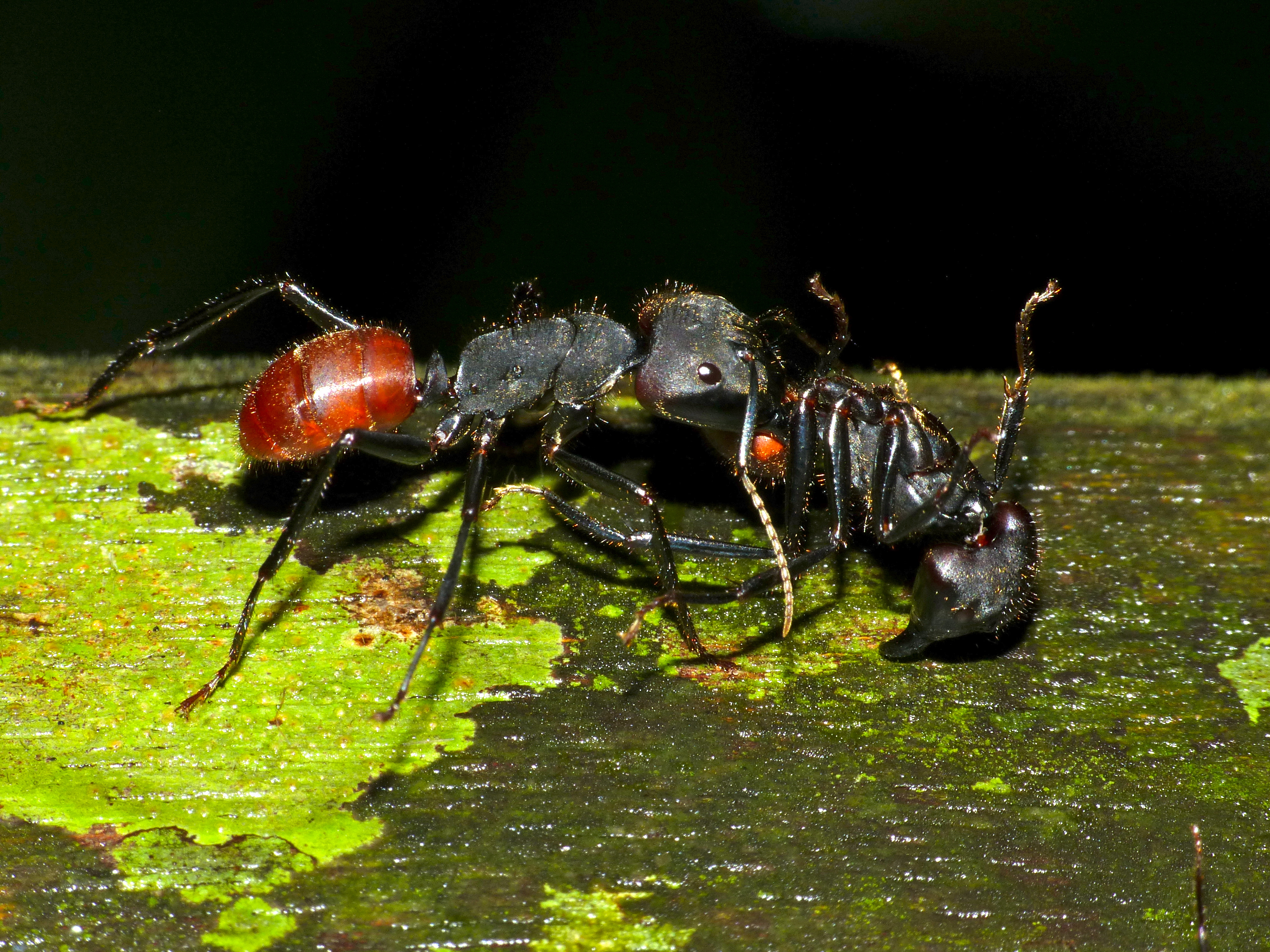
Dinomyrmex gigas

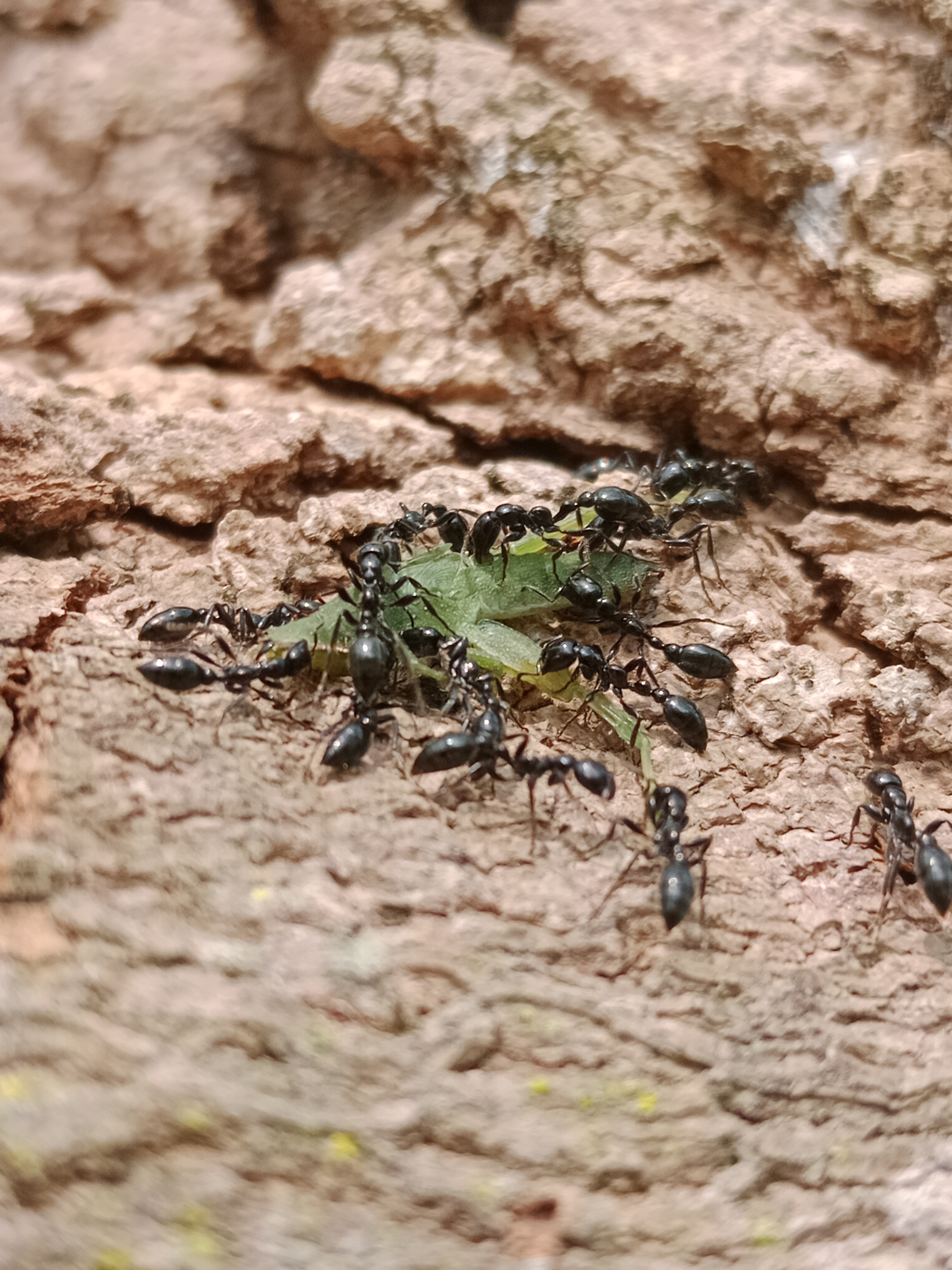
Tetraponera nigra

== List of species ==
=== Subfamily Amblyoponinae ===
- Subfamily Amblyoponinae [5 genera, 8 species]
  - Myopopone
    - Myopopone castanea (Smith, 1860)
  - Mystrium
    - Mystrium camillae Emery, 1889
  - Prionopelta
    - Prionopelta kraepelini Forel, 1905
  - Stigmatomma
    - Stigmatomma crenatum (Xu, 2001)
    - Stigmatomma quadratum Karavaiev, 1935
    - Stigmatomma reclinatum (Mayr, 1879)
    - Stigmatomma rothneyi (Forel, 1900)
  - Xymmer
    - Xymmer phungi Satria, Sasaki, Bui, Oguri, Syoji, Fisher, Yamane & Eguchi, 2016

=== Subfamily Dolichoderinae ===
- Subfamily Dolichoderinae [7 genera, 35 species]
  - Dolichoderus
    - Dolichoderus affinis Emery, 1889
    - Dolichoderus beccarii Emery, 1887
    - Dolichoderus butteli Forel, 1913
    - Dolichoderus cuspidatus (Smith, 1857)
    - Dolichoderus erectilobus Santschi, 1920
    - Dolichoderus feae Emery, 1889
    - Dolichoderus laotius Santschi, 1920
    - Dolichoderus semirugosus (Mayr, 1870)
    - Dolichoderus siggii Forel, 1895
    - Dolichoderus sulcaticeps (Mayr, 1870)
    - Dolichoderus taprobanae (Smith, 1858)
      - Dolichoderus taprobanae siamensis Forel, 1911
    - Dolichoderus thoracicus (Smith, 1860)
  - Iridomyrmex
    - Iridomyrmex anceps (Roger, 1863)
  - Ochetellus
    - Ochetellus glaber (Mayr, 1862)
  - Philidris
    - Philidris cordata (Smith, 1859)
    - Philidris myrmecodiae (Emery, 1887)
  - Tapinoma
    - Tapinoma indicum Forel, 1895
    - Tapinoma melanocephalum (Fabricius, 1793)
  - Technomyrmex
    - Technomyrmex albipes (Smith, 1861)
    - Technomyrmex butteli Forel, 1913
    - Technomyrmex brunneus Forel, 1895
    - Technomyrmex difficilis Forel, 1892
    - Technomyrmex elatior Forel, 1902
    - Technomyrmex grandis Emery, 1887
    - Technomyrmex horni Forel, 1912
    - Technomyrmex kraepelini Forel, 1905
    - Technomyrmex lisae Forel, 1913
    - Technomyrmex modiglianii Emery, 1900
    - Technomyrmex obscurior Wheeler, 1928
    - Technomyrmex pratensis (Smith, 1860)
    - Technomyrmex reductus Bolton, 2007
    - Technomyrmex strenuus Mayr, 1872
    - Technomyrmex vitiensis Mann, 1921
    - Technomyrmex yamanei Bolton, 2007

=== Subfamily Dorylinae ===
- Subfamily Dorylinae [12 genera, 52 species]
  - Aenictus
    - Aenictus artipus Wilson, 1964
    - Aenictus binghamii Forel, 1900
    - Aenictus brevipodus Jaitrong & Yamane, 2013
    - Aenictus camposi Wheeler & Chapman, 1925
    - Aenictus changmaianus Terayama & Kubota, 1993
    - Aenictus concavus Jaitrong & Yamane, 2013
    - Aenictus cornutus Forel, 1900
    - Aenictus cylindripetiolus Jaitrong & Yamane, 2013
    - Aenictus dentatus Forel, 1911
    - Aenictus doydeei Jaitrong & Yamane, 2011
    - Aenictus duengkaei Jaitrong & Yamane, 2012
    - Aenictus fuchuanensis Zhou, 2001
    - Aenictus fulvus Jaitrong & Yamane, 2011
    - Aenictus gracilis Emery, 1893
    - Aenictus hodgsoni Forel, 1901
    - Aenictus hottai Terayama & Yamane, 1989
    - Aenictus jarujini Jaitrong & Yamane, 2010
    - Aenictus khaoyaiensis Jaitrong & Yamane, 2013
    - Aenictus laeviceps (Smith, 1857)
    - Aenictus leptotyphlatta Jaitrong & Eguchi, 2010
    - Aenictus longinodus Jaitrong & Yamane, 2012
    - Aenictus maneerati Jaitrong & Yamane, 2013
    - Aenictus minutulus Terayama & Yamane, 1989
    - Aenictus nishimurai Terayama & Kubota, 1993
    - Aenictus nuchiti Jaitrong & Ruangsittichai, 2018
    - Aenictus paradentatus Jaitrong & Yamane, 2012
    - Aenictus parahuonicus Jaitrong & Yamane, 2011
    - Aenictus peguensis Emery, 1895
    - Aenictus pinkaewi Jaitrong & Yamane, 2013
    - Aenictus samungi Jaitrong & Ruangsittichai, 2018
    - Aenictus siamensis Jaitrong & Yamane, 2011
    - Aenictus sonchaengi Jaitrong & Yamane, 2011
    - Aenictus stenocephalus Jaitrong & Yamane, 2010
    - Aenictus thailandianus Terayama & Kubota, 1993
    - Aenictus vieti Jaitrong & Yamane, 2010
    - Aenictus watanasiti Jaitrong & Yamane, 2013
    - Aenictus wilaiae Jaitrong & Yamane, 2013
    - Aenictus wiwatwitayai Jaitrong & Yamane, 2013
    - Aenictus yamanei Wiwatwitaya & Jaitrong, 2011
  - Cerapachys
    - Cerapachys sulcinodis Emery, 1889
  - Chrysapace
    - Chrysapace costatus (Bharti & Wachkoo, 2013)
  - Dorylus
    - Dorylus laevigatus (Smith, 1857)
    - Dorylus orientalis Westwood, 1835
    - Dorylus vishnui Wheeler, 1913
  - Eusphinctus
    - Eusphinctus furcatus Emery, 1893
  - Lioponera
    - Lioponera longitarsus Mayr, 1879
  - Parasyscia
    - Parasyscia dohertyi (Emery, 1902)
  - Simopone
    - Simopone oculata Radchenko, 1993
  - Syscia
    - Syscia chaladthanyakiji Jaitrong, Wiwatwitaya & Yamane, 2020
    - Syscia reticularis Jaitrong, Wiwatwitaya & Yamane, 2020
  - Yunodorylus
    - Yunodorylus sexspinus Xu, 2000
  - Zasphinctus
    - Zasphinctus siamensis (Jaitrong, 2016)

=== Subfamily Ectatomminae ===
- Subfamily Ectatomminae [1 genus, 7 species]
  - Gnamptogenys
    - Gnamptogenys bicolor (Emery, 1889)
    - Gnamptogenys binghamii (Forel, 1900)
    - Gnamptogenys chapmani Brown, 1958
    - Gnamptogenys coxalis (Roger, 1860)
    - Gnamptogenys cribrata (Emery, 1900)
    - Gnamptogenys menadensis (Mayr, 1887)
    - Gnamptogenys ortostoma Lattke, 2004

=== Subfamily Formicinae ===
- Subfamily Formicinae [19 genera, 133 species]
  - Acropyga
    - Acropyga acutiventris Roger, 1862
    - Acropyga butteli Forel, 1912
  - Anoplolepis
    - Anoplolepis gracilipes (Smith, 1857)
  - Camponotus
    - Camponotus angusticollis (Jerdon, 1851)
    - Camponotus arrogans (Smith, 1858)
    - Camponotus aureus Dumpert, 2006
    - Camponotus auriventris Emery, 1889
    - Camponotus camelinus (Smith, 1857)
    - Camponotus concurrens Zettel & Laciny, 2018
    - Camponotus dolichoderoides Forel, 1911
    - Camponotus exiguoguttatus Forel, 1886
    - Camponotus irritabilis (Smith, 1857)
    - Camponotus irritans (Smith, 1857)
    - Camponotus khaosokensis Dumpert, 2006
    - Camponotus lasiselene Wang & Wu, 1994
    - Camponotus mitis (Smith, 1858)
    - Camponotus mutilarius Emery, 1893
    - Camponotus nicobarensis Mayr, 1865
    - Camponotus oblongus (Smith, 1858)
    - Camponotus paraleonardi Zettel & Yamane, 2018
    - Camponotus parius Emery, 1889
    - Camponotus rufifemur Emery, 1900
    - Camponotus rufoglaucus (Jerdon, 1851)
    - Camponotus schoedli Dumpert, 2006
    - Camponotus schulzianus Zettel & Balàka, 2018
    - Camponotus sericeus (Fabricius, 1798)
    - Camponotus singularis (Smith, 1858)
    - Camponotus sophiae Zettel & Balàka, 2018
    - Camponotus weiserti Zettel & Laciny, 2018
  - Cladomyrma
    - Cladomyrma petalae Agosti, 1991
    - Cladomyrma sirindhornae Jaitrong, Laedprathom & Yamane, 2013
  - Colobopsis
    - Colobopsis badia (Smith, 1857)
    - Colobopsis cylindrica (Fabricius, 1798)
    - Colobopsis explodens Laciny & Zettel, 2018
    - Colobopsis leonardi (Emery, 1889)
    - Colobopsis markli Dumpert, 2004
    - Colobopsis saundersi (Emery, 1889)
    - Colobopsis vitrea (Smith, 1860)
    - Colobopsis vitrea praerufa (Emery, 1900)
  - Dinomyrmex
    - Dinomyrmex gigas (Latreille, 1802)
  - Echinopla
    - Echinopla charernsomi Tanansathaporn & Jaitrong, 2018
    - Echinopla cherapunjiensis Bharti & Gul, 2012
    - Echinopla fisheri Zettel & Laciny, 2015
    - Echinopla jeenthongi Tanansathaporn & Jaitrong, 2018
    - Echinopla lineata Mayr, 1862
    - Echinopla madli Zettel & Laciny, 2015
    - Echinopla melanarctos Smith, 1857
    - Echinopla pallipes Smith, 1857
    - Echinopla striata Smith, 1857
    - Echinopla tritschleri Forel, 1901
    - Echinopla tunkuabduljalilii Laciny, Zettel, Maryati & Noor–Izwan, 2019
  - Euprenolepis
    - Euprenolepis procera (Emery, 1900)
    - Euprenolepis wittei LaPolla, 2009
  - Lepisiota
    - Lepisiota watsonii (Forel, 1894)
  - Myrmoteras
    - Myrmoteras binghamii Forel, 1893
    - Myrmoteras concolor Bui, Eguchi & Yamane, 2013
    - Myrmoteras cuneonodus Xu, 1998
    - Myrmoteras jaitrongi Bui, Eguchi & Yamane, 2013
    - Myrmoteras opalinum Bui, Eguchi & Yamane, 2013
    - Myrmoteras tomimasai Bui, Eguchi & Yamane, 2013
  - Oecophylla
    - Oecophylla smaragdina (Fabricius, 1775)
  - Paraparatrechina
    - Paraparatrechina opaca (Emery, 1887)
  - Paratrechina
    - Paratrechina longicornis (Latreille, 1802)
  - Polyrhachis
    - Polyrhachis abdominalis Smith, 1858
    - Polyrhachis alatisquamis Forel, 1893
    - Polyrhachis arachne Emery, 1896
    - Polyrhachis arcuata (Le Guillou, 1842)
    - Polyrhachis armata (Le Guillou, 1842)
    - Polyrhachis bicolor Smith, 1858
    - Polyrhachis bihamata (Drury, 1773)
    - Polyrhachis boltoni Dorow & Kohout, 1995
    - Polyrhachis calypso Forel, 1911
    - Polyrhachis carbonaria Smith, 1857
    - Polyrhachis cephalotes Emery, 1893
    - Polyrhachis chalybea Smith, 1857
    - Polyrhachis craddocki Bingham, 1903
    - Polyrhachis cryptoceroides Emery, 1887
    - Polyrhachis dives Smith, 1857
    - Polyrhachis dolomedes Smith, 1863
    - Polyrhachis flavicornis Smith, 1857
    - Polyrhachis flavoflagellata Karavaiev, 1927
    - Polyrhachis fortis Emery, 1893
    - Polyrhachis furcata Smith, 1858
    - Polyrhachis halidayi Emery, 1889
    - Polyrhachis hauxwelli Bingham, 1903
    - Polyrhachis hector Smith, 1857
    - Polyrhachis hemiopticoides Mukerjee, 1930
    - Polyrhachis hippomanes Smith, 1861
    - Polyrhachis hodgsoni Forel, 1902
    - Polyrhachis illaudata Walker, 1859
    - Polyrhachis illaudata intermedia Forel, 1886
    - Polyrhachis inermis Smith, 1858
    - Polyrhachis javanica Mayr, 1867
    - Polyrhachis laevigata Smith, 1857
    - Polyrhachis laevissima Smith, 1858
    - Polyrhachis lama Kohout, 1994
    - Polyrhachis latona Wheeler, 1909
    - Polyrhachis mitrata Menozzi, 1932
    - Polyrhachis moesta Emery, 1887
    - Polyrhachis muelleri Forel, 1893
    - Polyrhachis nigropilosa Mayr, 1872
    - Polyrhachis noonananti Kohout, 2013
    - Polyrhachis ochracea Karavaiev, 1927
    - Polyrhachis olybria Forel, 1912
    - Polyrhachis phalerata Menozzi, 1926
    - Polyrhachis piliventris Smith, 1858
    - Polyrhachis proxima Roger, 1863
    - Polyrhachis pubescens Mayr, 1879
    - Polyrhachis rastellata (Latreille, 1802)
    - Polyrhachis rixosa Smith, 1858
    - Polyrhachis rufipes Smith, 1858
    - Polyrhachis saevissima kerri Forel, 1911
    - Polyrhachis sculpturata Smith, 1860
    - Polyrhachis sculpturata siamensis Mayr, 1879
    - Polyrhachis shixingensis Wu & Wang, 1995
    - Polyrhachis striata Mayr, 1862
    - Polyrhachis textor Smith, 1857
    - Polyrhachis thailandica Kohout, 2006
    - Polyrhachis thrinax Roger, 1863
    - Polyrhachis tibialis Smith, 1858
    - Polyrhachis varicolor Viehmeyer, 1916
    - Polyrhachis venus Forel, 1893
    - Polyrhachis villipes Smith, 1857
    - Polyrhachis watanasiti Kohout, 2013
    - Polyrhachis ypsilon Emery, 1887
  - Prenolepis
    - Prenolepis darlena Williams & LaPolla, 2016
    - Prenolepis fustinoda Williams & LaPolla, 2016
    - Prenolepis jacobsoni Crawley, 1923
    - Prenolepis jerdoni Emery, 1893
    - Prenolepis melanogaster Emery, 1893
    - Prenolepis naoroji Forel, 1902
    - Prenolepis shanialena Williams & LaPolla, 2016
  - Pseudolasius
    - Pseudolasius silvestrii Wheeler, 1927

=== Subfamily Amblyoponinae ===
- Subfamily Leptanillinae [2 genera, 1 species]
  - Leptanilla
    - Leptanilla thai Baroni Urbani, 1977

=== Subfamily Myrmicinae ===
- Subfamily Myrmicinae [40 genera, 216 species]
  - Acanthomyrmex
    - Acanthomyrmex ferox Emery, 1893
    - Acanthomyrmex malikuli Jaitrong & Asanok, 2019
    - Acanthomyrmex mizunoi Jaitrong & Asanok, 2019
    - Acanthomyrmex thailandensis Terayama, 1995
  - Anillomyrma
    - Anillomyrma decamera (Emery, 1901)
  - Calyptomyrmex
    - Calyptomyrmex beccarii Emery, 1887
    - Calyptomyrmex rectopilosus Dlussky & Radchenko, 1990
  - Cardiocondyla
    - Cardiocondyla emeryi Forel, 1881
    - Cardiocondyla itsukii Seifert, Okita & Heinze, 2017
    - Cardiocondyla kagutsuchi Terayama, 1999
    - Cardiocondyla wroughtonii (Forel, 1890)
  - Carebara
    - Carebara affinis (Jerdon, 1851)
    - Carebara castanea Smith, 1858
    - Carebara diversa (Jerdon, 1851)
    - Carebara lignata Westwood, 1840
    - Carebara pygmaea (Emery, 1887)
    - Carebara silenus (Smith, 1858)
    - Carebara trechideros (Zhou & Zheng, 1997)
  - Cataulacus
    - Cataulacus granulatus (Latreille, 1802)
    - Cataulacus horridus Smith, 1857
    - Cataulacus latus Forel, 1891
    - Cataulacus muticus Emery, 1889
    - Cataulacus praetextus Smith, 1867
  - Crematogaster
    - Crematogaster aberrans Forel, 1892
    - Crematogaster artifex Mayr, 1879
    - Crematogaster aurita Karavaiev, 1935
    - Crematogaster baduvi Forel, 1912
    - Crematogaster bandarensis Forel, 1913
    - Crematogaster binghamii Forel, 1904
    - Crematogaster bouvardi Santschi, 1920
    - Crematogaster coriaria Mayr, 1872
    - Crematogaster difformis Smith, 1857
    - Crematogaster dohrni Mayr, 1879
    - Crematogaster dohrni fabricans Forel, 1911
    - Crematogaster dohrni kerri Forel, 1911
    - Crematogaster dubia Karavaiev, 1935
    - Crematogaster ferrarii Emery, 1888
    - Crematogaster fraxatrix Forel, 1911
    - Crematogaster fumikoae Hosoishi & Ogata, 2015
    - Crematogaster hashimi Hosoishi, 2015
    - Crematogaster inflata Smith, 1857
    - Crematogaster longipilosa Forel, 1907
    - Crematogaster modiglianii Emery, 1900
    - Crematogaster onusta Stitz, 1925
    - Crematogaster physothorax Emery, 1889
    - Crematogaster pia Forel, 1911
    - Crematogaster quadriruga Forel, 1911
    - Crematogaster reticulata Hosoishi, 2009
    - Crematogaster rogenhoferi Mayr, 1879
    - Crematogaster rothneyi Mayr, 1879
    - Crematogaster sewardi Forel, 1901
    - Crematogaster treubi Emery, 1896: 246
  - Dacetinops
    - Dacetinops concinnus Taylor, 1965
  - Dilobocondyla
    - Dilobocondyla fouqueti Santschi, 1910
  - Epelysidris
    - Epelysidris brocha Bolton, 1987
  - Erromyrma
    - Erromyrma latinodis (Mayr, 1872)
  - Eurhopalothrix
    - Eurhopalothrix heliscata Wilson & Brown, 1985
  - Gauromyrmex
    - Gauromyrmex acanthinus (Karavaiev, 1935)
  - Kartidris
    - Kartidris matertera Bolton, 1991
  - Lasiomyrma
    - Lasiomyrma wiwatwitayai Jaitrong, 2010
  - Liomyrmex
    - Liomyrmex gestroi (Emery, 1887)
  - Lophomyrmex
    - Lophomyrmex bedoti Emery, 1893
    - Lophomyrmex birmanus Emery, 1893
    - Lophomyrmex lucidus Menozzi, 1930
    - Lophomyrmex striatulus Rigato, 1994
  - Mayriella
    - Mayriella transfuga Baroni Urbani, 1977
  - Meranoplus
    - Meranoplus bicolor (Guérin–Méneville, 1844)
    - Meranoplus castaneus Smith, 1857
    - Meranoplus laeviventris Emery, 1889
    - Meranoplus mucronatus Smith, 1857
  - Monomorium
    - Monomorium chinense Santschi, 1925
    - Monomorium floricola (Jerdon, 1851)
    - Monomorium pharaonis (Linnaeus, 1758)
  - Myrmecina
    - Myrmecina asiatica Okido, Ogata & Hosoishi, 2020
    - Myrmecina dechai Okido, Ogata & Hosoishi, 2020
    - Myrmecina inflata Okido, Ogata & Hosoishi, 2020
    - Myrmecina inthanonensis Okido, Ogata & Hosoishi, 2020
    - Myrmecina maryatiae Okido, Ogata & Hosoishi, 2020
    - Myrmecina raviwonghei Jaitrong, Samung, Waengsothorn & Okido, 2019
  - Myrmica
    - Myrmica ritae Emery, 1889
  - Myrmicaria
    - Myrmicaria arachnoides lutea Emery, 1900
    - Myrmicaria birmana Forel, 1902
    - Myrmicaria brunnea Saunders, 1842
    - Myrmicaria vidua Smith, 1858
  - Paratopula
    - Paratopula macta Bolton, 1988
  - Pheidole
    - Pheidole aglae Forel, 1913
    - Pheidole annexa Eguchi, 2001
    - Pheidole aristotelis Forel, 1911
    - Pheidole binghamii Forel, 1902
    - Pheidole bluntschlii Forel, 1911
    - Pheidole butteli Forel, 1913
    - Pheidole capellinii Emery, 1887
    - Pheidole cariniceps Eguchi, 2001
    - Pheidole clypeocornis Eguchi, 2001
    - Pheidole comata Smith, 1858
    - Pheidole dugasi Forel, 1911
    - Pheidole elongicephala Eguchi, 2008
    - Pheidole elisae Emery, 1900
    - Pheidole fervens Smith, 1858
    - Pheidole fortis Eguchi, 2006
    - Pheidole gatesi (Wheeler, 1927)
    - Pheidole hongkongensis Wheeler, 1928
    - Pheidole hortensis Forel, 1913
    - Pheidole huberi Forel, 1911
    - Pheidole inornata Eguchi, 2001
    - Pheidole inscrobiculata Viehmeyer, 1916
    - Pheidole jacobsoni Forel, 1911
    - Pheidole rugifera Eguchi, 2001
    - Pheidole magrettii Emery, 1887
    - Pheidole megacephala (Fabricius, 1793)
    - Pheidole nodgii Forel, 1905
    - Pheidole nodifera (Smith, 1858)
    - Pheidole nodus Smith, 1874
    - Pheidole parva Mayr, 1865
    - Pheidole pieli Santschi, 1925
    - Pheidole plagiaria Smith, 1860
    - Pheidole planifrons Santschi, 1920
    - Pheidole plinii Forel, 1911
    - Pheidole protea Forel, 1912
    - Pheidole quadricuspis Emery, 1900
    - Pheidole rabo Forel, 1913
    - Pheidole rinae Emery, 1900
    - Pheidole rugithorax Eguchi, 2008
    - Pheidole sarawakana Forel, 1911
    - Pheidole sauberi Forel, 1905
    - Pheidole singaporensis Özdikmen, 2010
    - Pheidole smythiesii Forel, 1902
    - Pheidole spathifera Forel, 1902
    - Pheidole taipoana Wheeler, 1928
    - Pheidole taivanensis Forel, 1912
    - Pheidole tandjongensis Forel, 1913
    - Pheidole tjibodana Forel, 1905
    - Pheidole tumida Eguchi, 2008
    - Pheidole vulgaris Eguchi, 2006
    - Pheidole yeensis Forel, 1902
    - Pheidole zoceana Santschi, 1925
  - Pristomyrmex
    - Pristomyrmex bicolor Emery, 1900
    - Pristomyrmex brevispinosus Emery, 1887
    - Pristomyrmex leleji Yamane & Dias, 2016
    - Pristomyrmex punctatus (Smith, 1860)
    - Pristomyrmex rigidus Wang, 2003
    - Pristomyrmex sulcatus Emery, 1895
    - Pristomyrmex trachylissus (Smith, 1858)
  - Proatta
    - Proatta butteli Forel, 1912
  - Recurvidris
    - Recurvidris browni Bolton, 1992
    - Recurvidris chanapaithooni Jaitrong & Wiwatwitaya, 2015
    - Recurvidris lekakuli Jaitrong, Tokeeree & Pitaktunsakul, 2019
    - Recurvidris recurvispinosa (Forel, 1890)
  - Rhopalomastix
    - Rhopalomastix javana Wheeler, 1929
    - Rhopalomastix johorensis Wheeler, 1929
  - Solenopsis
    - Solenopsis geminata (Fabricius, 1804)
  - Strumigenys
    - Strumigenys adiastola Bolton, 2000
    - Strumigenys amnesia Bolton, 2000
    - Strumigenys arges (Bolton, 2000)
    - Strumigenys atropos (Bolton, 2000)
    - Strumigenys benulia Bolton, 2000
    - Strumigenys brontes (Bolton, 2000)
    - Strumigenys caniophanes Bolton, 2000
    - Strumigenys confusatrix Bolton, 2000
    - Strumigenys dipsas Bolton, 2000
    - Strumigenys dohertyi Emery, 1897
    - Strumigenys doriae Emery, 1887
    - Strumigenys elegantula (Terayama & Kubota, 1989)
    - Strumigenys exilirhina Bolton, 2000
    - Strumigenys feae Emery, 1895
    - Strumigenys gnathosphax Bolton, 2000
    - Strumigenys kichijo (Terayama, Lin et Wu, 1996)
    - Strumigenys kraepelini Forel, 1905
    - Strumigenys mitis (Brown, 2000)
    - Strumigenys nanzanensis Lin & Wu, 1996
    - Strumigenys nepalensis De Andrade, 1994
    - Strumigenys nothomopyx Bolton, 2000
    - Strumigenys nytaxis Bolton, 2000
    - Strumigenys paraposta Bolton, 2000
    - Strumigenys rotogenys Bolton, 2000
    - Strumigenys sauteri (Forel, 1912)
    - Strumigenys scolopax (Bolton, 2000)
    - Strumigenys signeae Forel, 1905
    - Strumigenys strygax Bolton, 2000
    - Strumigenys sublaminata Brown, 1959
    - Strumigenys sydorata Bolton, 2000
    - Strumigenys taphra Bolton, 2000
    - Strumigenys tritomea Bolton, 2000
  - Syllophopsis
    - Syllophopsis australica (Forel, 1907)
    - Syllophopsis sechellensis (Emery, 1894)
  - Tetheamyrma
    - Tetheamyrma subspongia Bolton, 1991
  - Tetramorium
    - Tetramorium adelphon Bolton, 1979
    - Tetramorium aptum Bolton, 1977
    - Tetramorium bicarinatum (Nylander, 1846)
    - Tetramorium ciliatum Bolton, 1977
    - Tetramorium cuneinode Bolton, 1977
    - Tetramorium eleates Forel, 1913
    - Tetramorium flavipes Emery, 1893
    - Tetramorium hasinae Yamane & Jaitrong, 2011
    - Tetramorium indosinense Wheeler, 1927
    - Tetramorium insolens (Smith, 1861)
    - Tetramorium kheperra (Bolton, 1976)
    - Tetramorium lanuginosum Mayr, 1870
    - Tetramorium nacta (Bolton, 1976)
    - Tetramorium nipponense Wheeler, 1928
    - Tetramorium obtusidens Viehmeyer, 1916
    - Tetramorium pacificum Mayr, 1870
    - Tetramorium palaense Bolton, 1979
    - Tetramorium parvispinum (Emery, 1893)
    - Tetramorium parvum Bolton, 1977
    - Tetramorium polymorphum Yamane & Jaitrong, 2011
    - Tetramorium securis Roncin, 2002
    - Tetramorium seneb Bolton, 1977
    - Tetramorium simillimum (Smith, 1851)
    - Tetramorium smithi Mayr, 1879
    - Tetramorium walshi (Forel, 1890)
    - Tetramorium wroughtonii (Forel, 1902)
  - Trichomyrmex
    - Trichomyrmex destructor (Jerdon, 1851)
  - Vollenhovia
    - Vollenhovia emeryi Wheeler, 1906
    - Vollenhovia fridae Forel, 1913
    - Vollenhovia rufiventris Forel, 1901

=== Subfamily Ponerinae ===
- Subfamily Ponerinae [19 genera, 56 species]
  - Anochetus
    - Anochetus graeffei Mayr, 1870
    - Anochetus modicus Brown, 1978
    - Anochetus myops Emery, 1893
    - Anochetus princeps Emery, 1884
    - Anochetus rugosus (Smith, 1857)
  - Brachyponera
    - Brachyponera chinensis (Emery, 1895) species complex
    - Brachyponera luteipes (Mayr, 1862)
    - Brachyponera nigrita (Emery, 1895)
  - Buniapone
    - Buniapone amblyops (Emery, 1887)
  - Centromyrmex
    - Centromyrmex feae (Emery, 1889)
  - Cryptopone
    - Cryptopone testacea Emery, 1893
  - Diacamma
    - Diacamma intricatum (Smith, 1857)
    - Diacamma jaitrongi Zettel, Pal & Laciny, 2016
    - Diacamma longitudinale Emery, 1889
    - Diacamma orbiculatum Santschi, 1932
    - Diacamma violaceum Forel, 1900
  - Ectomomyrmex
    - Ectomomyrmex annamitus (André, 1892)
    - Ectomomyrmex astutus (Smith, 1858)
    - Ectomomyrmex leeuwenhoeki (Forel, 1886)
  - Emeryopone
    - Emeryopone buttelreepeni Forel, 1912
  - Harpegnathos
    - Harpegnathos venator (Smith, 1858)
  - Leptogenys
    - Leptogenys aspera (André, 1889)
    - Leptogenys birmana Forel, 1900
    - Leptogenys borneensis Wheeler, 1919
    - Leptogenys cyanicatena Arimoto & Yamane, 2018
    - Leptogenys diminuta (Smith, 1857)
    - Leptogenys hysterica Forel, 1900
    - Leptogenys iridescens (Smith, 1857)
    - Leptogenys kitteli (Mayr, 1870)
    - Leptogenys kitteli altisquamis Forel, 1900
    - Leptogenys kraepelini Forel, 1905
    - Leptogenys lucidula Emery, 1895
    - Leptogenys mutabilis (Smith, 1861)
    - Leptogenys myops (Emery, 1887)
    - Leptogenys punctiventris (Mayr, 1879)
  - Mesoponera
    - Mesoponera rubra (Smith, 1857)
  - Myopias
    - Myopias bidens (Emery, 1900)
    - Myopias crawleyi (Donisthorpe, 1941)
    - Myopias maligna punctigera (Emery, 1900)
    - Myopias mandibularis (Crawley, 1924)
    - Myopias minima Jaitrong, Tasen & Guénard, 2018
    - Myopias sakaeratensis Jaitrong, Tasen & Guénard, 2018
    - Myopias sonthichaiae Jaitrong, Tasen & Guénard, 2018
  - Odontomachus
    - Odontomachus latidens Mayr, 1867
    - Odontomachus monticola Emery, 1892
    - Odontomachus rixosus Smith, 1857
    - Odontomachus simillimus Smith, 1858
    - Odontoponera denticulata (Smith, 1858)
    - Odontoponera transversa (Smith, 1857)
  - Parvaponera
    - Parvaponera darwinii (Forel, 1893)
  - Platythyrea
    - Platythyrea clypeata Forel, 1911
    - Platythyrea janyai Phengsi, Jaitrong, Ruangsittichai & Khachonpisitsak, 2018
    - Platythyrea parallela (Smith, 1859)
    - Platythyrea quadridenta Donisthorpe, 1941
    - Platythyrea tricuspidata Emery, 1900
    - Pseudoneoponera rufipes (Jerdon, 1851)

=== Subfamily Proceratiinae ===
- Subfamily Proceratiinae [3 genera, 5 species]
  - Probolomyrmex
    - Probolomyrmex dammermani Wheeler, 1928
    - Probolomyrmex longinodus Terayama & Ogata, 1988
    - Probolomyrmex vieti Eguchi, Yoshimura et Yamane, 2006
  - Proceratium
    - Proceratium deelemani Perrault, 1981
    - Proceratium siamense de Andrade, 2003

=== Subfamily Pseudomyrmecinae ===
- Subfamily Pseudomyrmecinae [1 genus, 16 species]
  - Tetraponera
    - Tetraponera aitkenii (Forel, 1902)
    - Tetraponera allaborans (Walker, 1859)
    - Tetraponera attenuata Smith, 1877
    - Tetraponera binghami (Forel, 1902)
    - Tetraponera concava Xu & Chai, 2004
    - Tetraponera connectens Ward, 2001
    - Tetraponera crassiuscula (Emery, 1900)
    - Tetraponera difficilis (Emery, 1900)
    - Tetraponera extenuata Ward, 2001
    - Tetraponera modesta (Smith, 1860)
    - Tetraponera nigra (Jerdon, 1851)
    - Tetraponera nitida (Smith, 1860)
    - Tetraponera nodosa Ward, 2001
    - Tetraponera notabilis Ward, 2001
    - Tetraponera pilosa (Smith, 1858)
    - Tetraponera rufonigra (Jerdon, 1851)

== See also ==
- List of ant genera
- List of beetles of Thailand
- List of butterflies of Thailand
