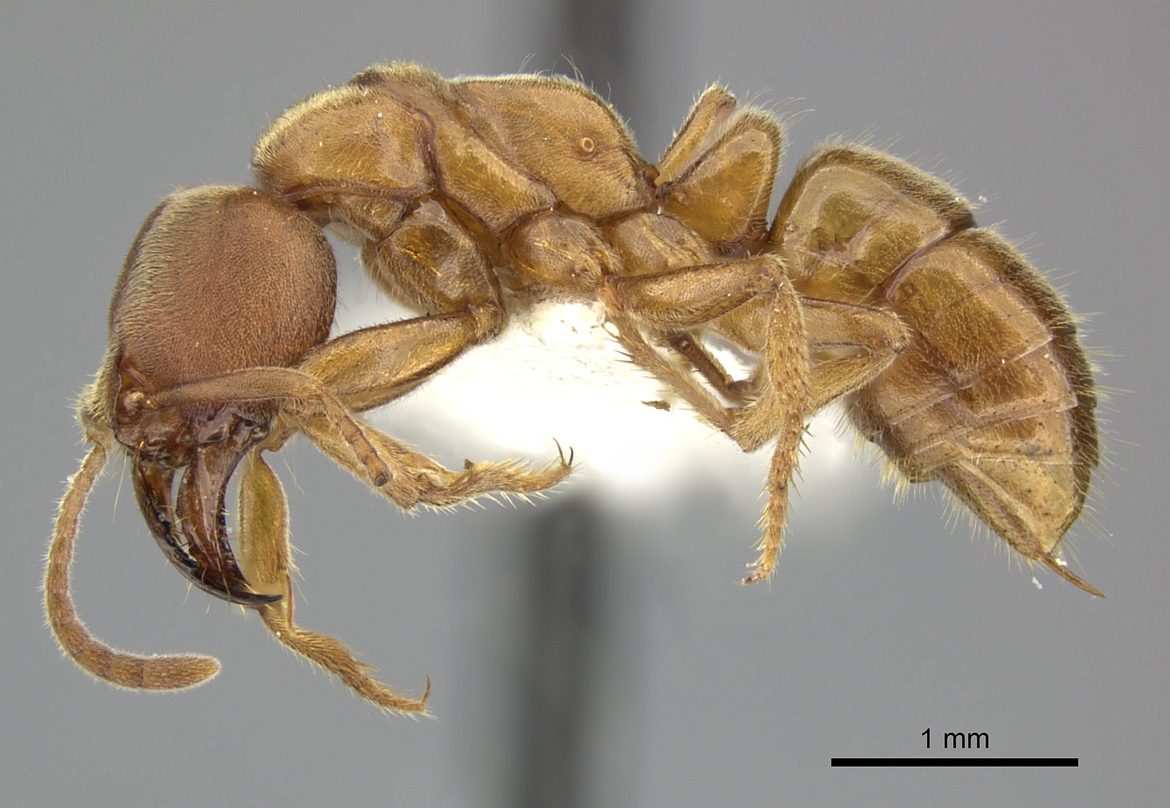
- Wadeura guianensis worker

Scientific classification
- Kingdom: Animalia
- Phylum: Arthropoda
- Clade: Pancrustacea
- Class: Insecta
- Order: Hymenoptera
- Family: Formicidae
- Subfamily: Ponerinae
- Tribe: Ponerini
- Alliance: Ponera genus group
- Genus: Wadeura; Weber, 1939

Type species
- Wadeura guianensis Weber, 1939

Diversity
- 4 species

= Wadeura =

Genus of ants

Wadeura is a genus of ponerine ants containing four described species native to parts of Central and South America. Originally described in 1939 by N. A. Weber, it was synonymized under Pachycondyla for a time, transferred to Cryptopone in 2014, and reinstated as a genus by Branstetter & Longino, 2022.

== Species ==
- Wadeura guianensis Weber, 1939
- Wadeura holmgreni (Wheeler, 1925)
- Wadeura holmgrenita Branstetter & Longino, 2022
- Wadeura pauli (Fernandes & Delabie, 2019)
