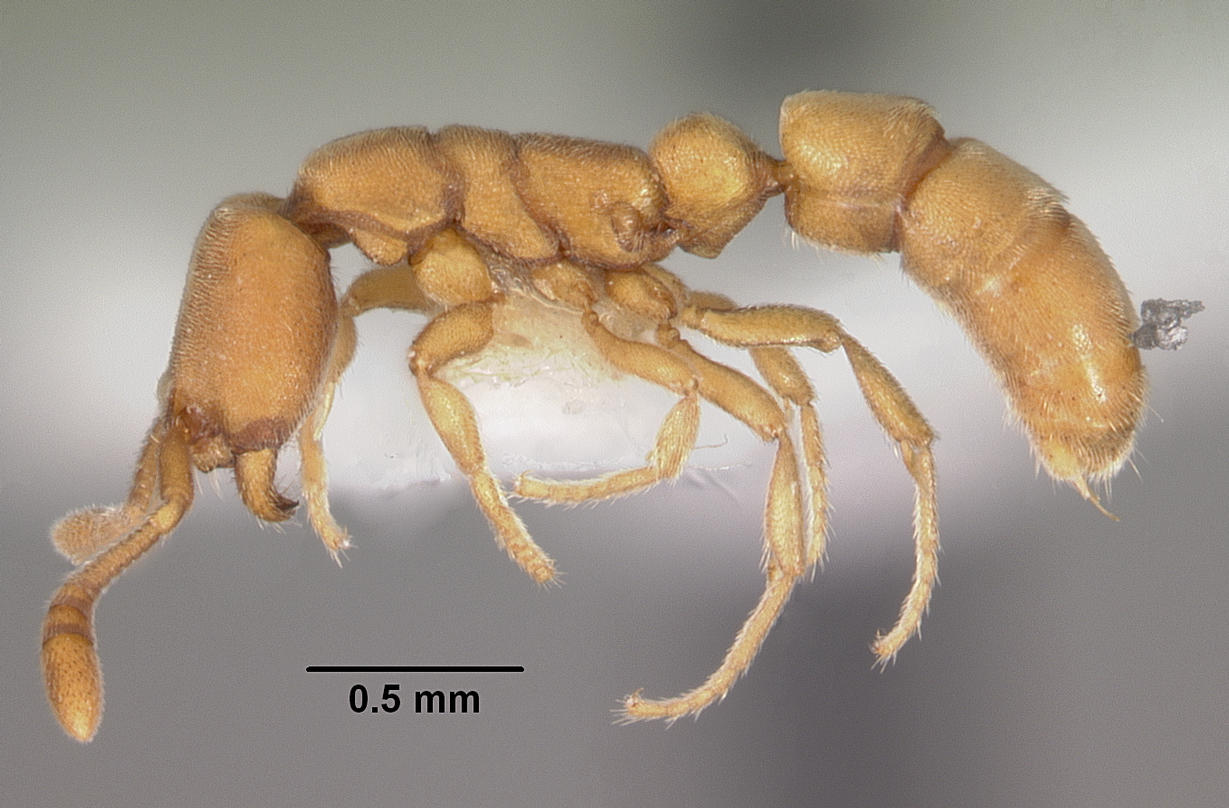
- Cryptopone odax worker

Scientific classification
- Kingdom: Animalia
- Phylum: Arthropoda
- Class: Insecta
- Order: Hymenoptera
- Family: Formicidae
- Subfamily: Ponerinae
- Tribe: Ponerini
- Genus: Cryptopone
- Species: C. odax

Binomial name
- Cryptopone odax (Schmidt & Shattuck, 2014)

= Cryptopone odax =

Genus of ants

Cryptopone odax is a species of ponerine ant native to Australia. They were originally placed in their own genus Iroponera, however molecular analysis by Fisher et al. in 2025 places them within the genus Cryptopone.

Its workers are orange-colored and small in size (2.6 mm). Queens and males of this species remain unknown. Little is known about their biology, but their small eyes indicate a subterranean lifestyle.
