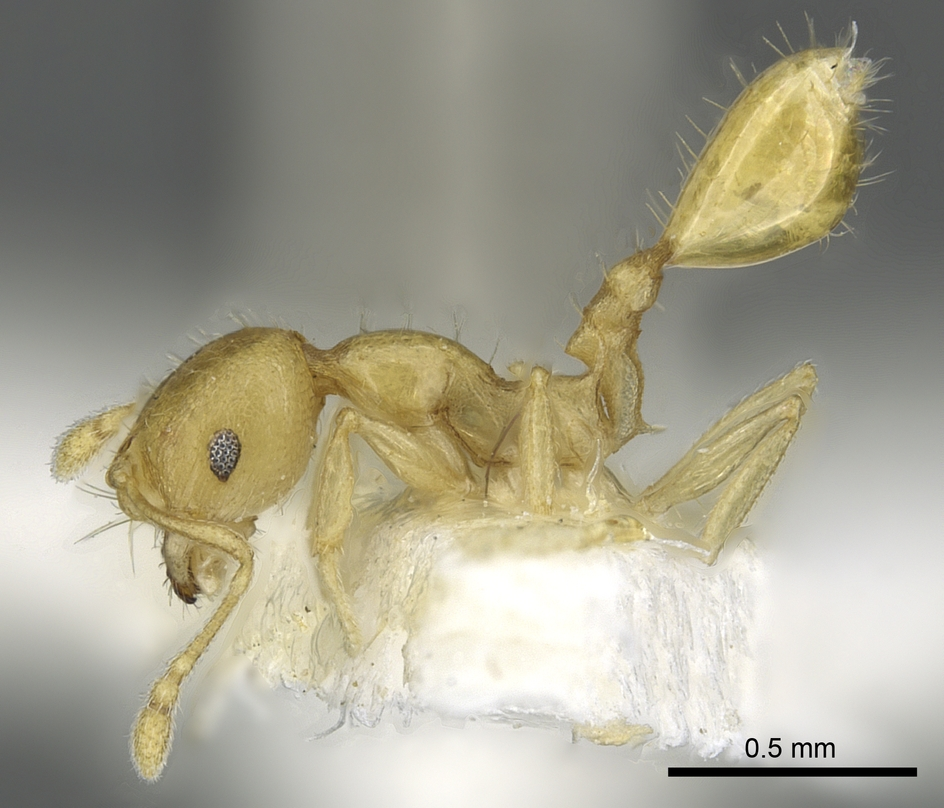

Scientific classification
- Kingdom: Animalia
- Phylum: Arthropoda
- Clade: Pancrustacea
- Class: Insecta
- Order: Hymenoptera
- Family: Formicidae
- Subfamily: Myrmicinae
- Genus: Recurvidris
- Species: R. pickburni

Binomial name
- Recurvidris pickburni Bolton, 1992

= Recurvidris pickburni =

Species of ant

Recurvidris pickburni is a species of ant of the subfamily Myrmicinae, which can be found from Sri Lanka.
