= Vollenhovia escherichi =

Scientific classification
- Kingdom: Animalia
- Phylum: Arthropoda
- Clade: Pancrustacea
- Class: Insecta
- Order: Hymenoptera
- Family: Formicidae
- Subfamily: Myrmicinae
- Genus: Vollenhovia
- Species: V. escherichi

Binomial name
- Vollenhovia escherichi Forel, 1911

Species of ant

Vollenhovia escherichi is a species of ant in the subfamily Myrmicinae. It is found in Sri Lanka.
