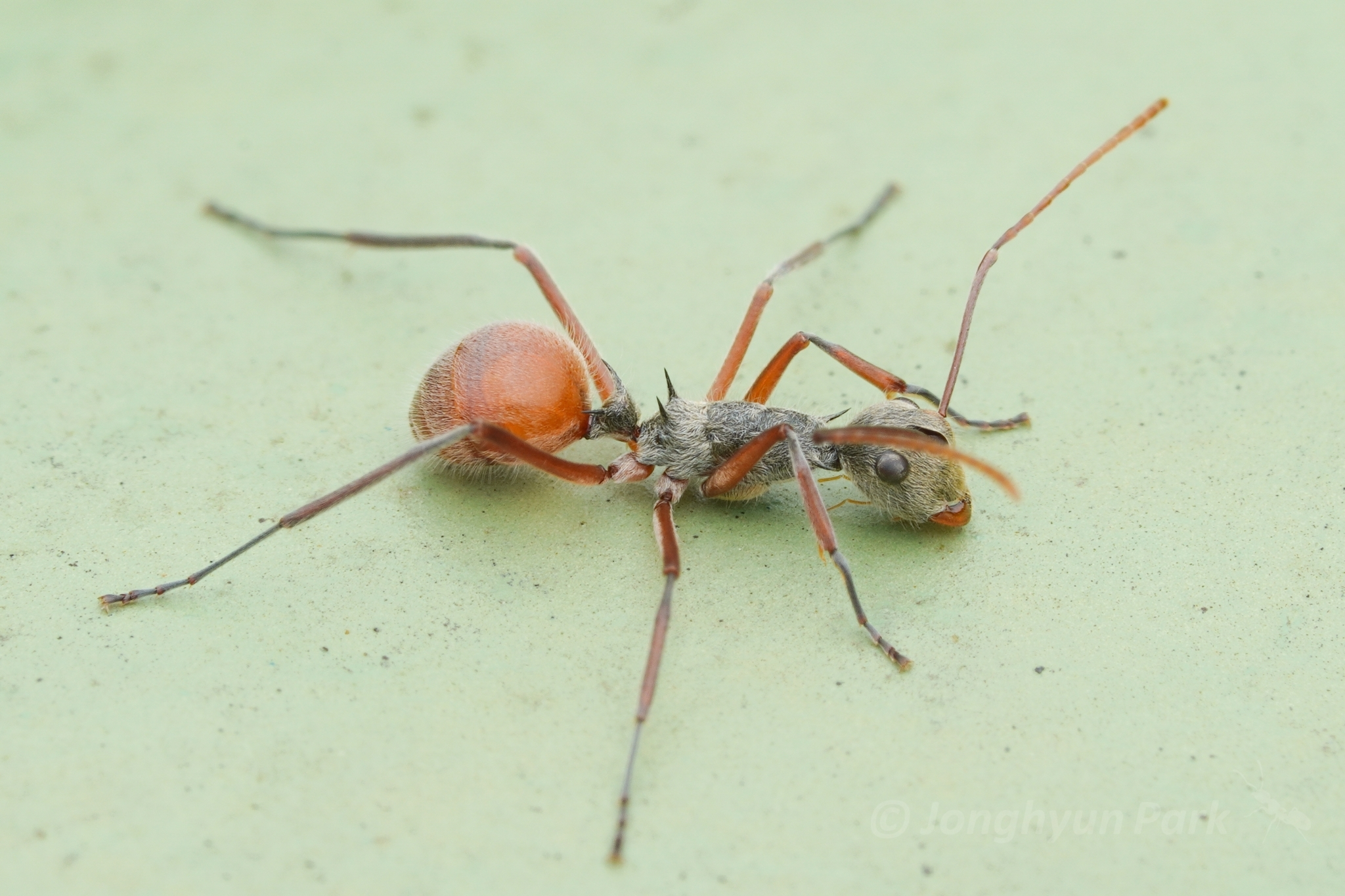

Scientific classification
- Kingdom: Animalia
- Phylum: Arthropoda
- Clade: Pancrustacea
- Class: Insecta
- Order: Hymenoptera
- Family: Formicidae
- Subfamily: Formicinae
- Genus: Polyrhachis
- Species: P. bicolor

Binomial name
- Polyrhachis bicolor Smith, 1858

= Polyrhachis bicolor =

Species of ant

Polyrhachis bicolor is a member of the camponotin ants in the genus Polyrhachis ranging from Australia to the tip of China.

== Appearance ==
This species has a red back abdomen and thinly hairy front abdomen with two spikes in front of a small white stripe. this ant has 6 legs and a light tip on each antenna.

This species is host to a number of parisitioid fungi which hijack the ants brains.

== Specimens ==
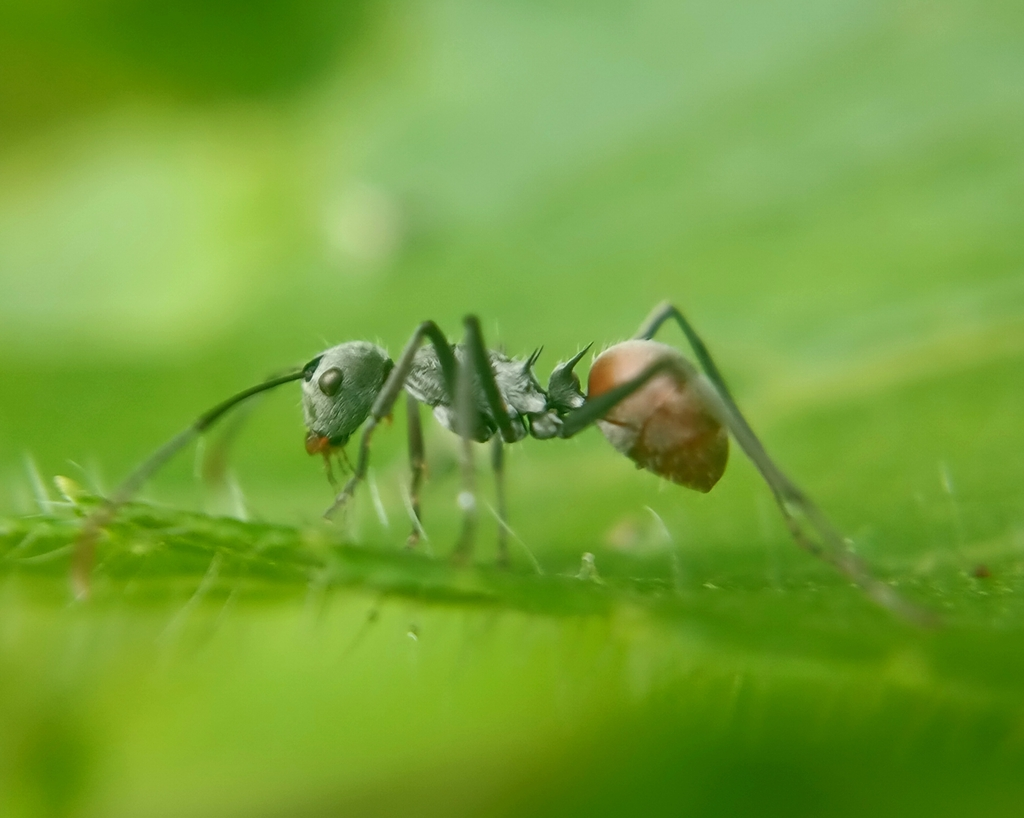
A side view of Polyrhachis bicolor

There are a lot of records of this species and countless pinned specimens.
