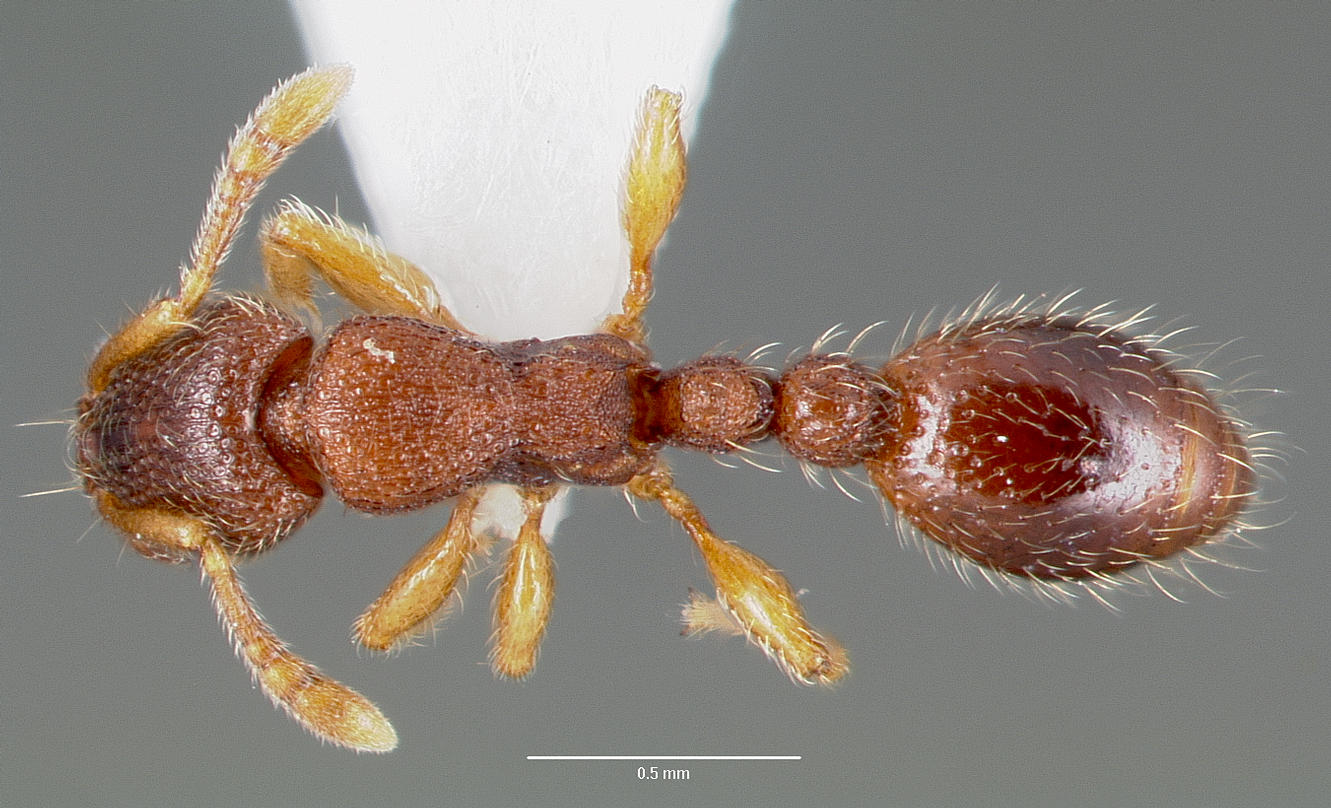

Scientific classification
- Kingdom: Animalia
- Phylum: Arthropoda
- Class: Insecta
- Order: Hymenoptera
- Family: Formicidae
- Subfamily: Myrmicinae
- Genus: Vollenhovia
- Species: V. emeryi

Binomial name
- Vollenhovia emeryi Wheeler, 1906

= Vollenhovia emeryi =

Species of ant

Vollenhovia emeryi is a species of ant in the family Formicidae.

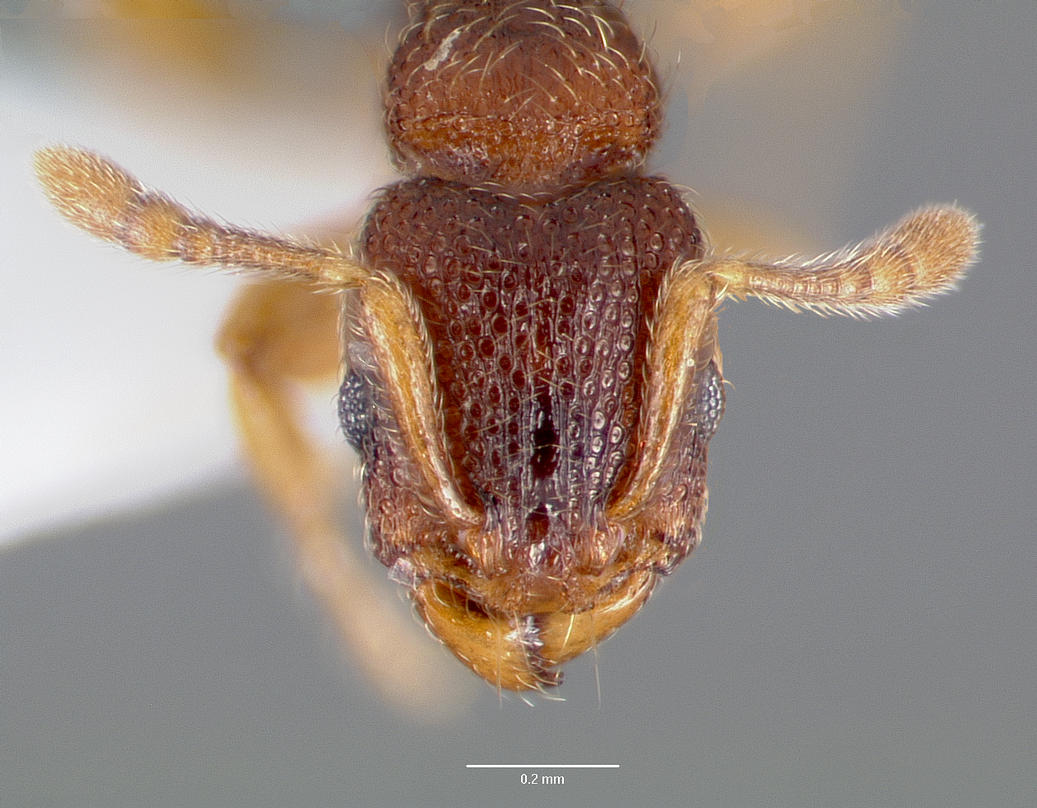

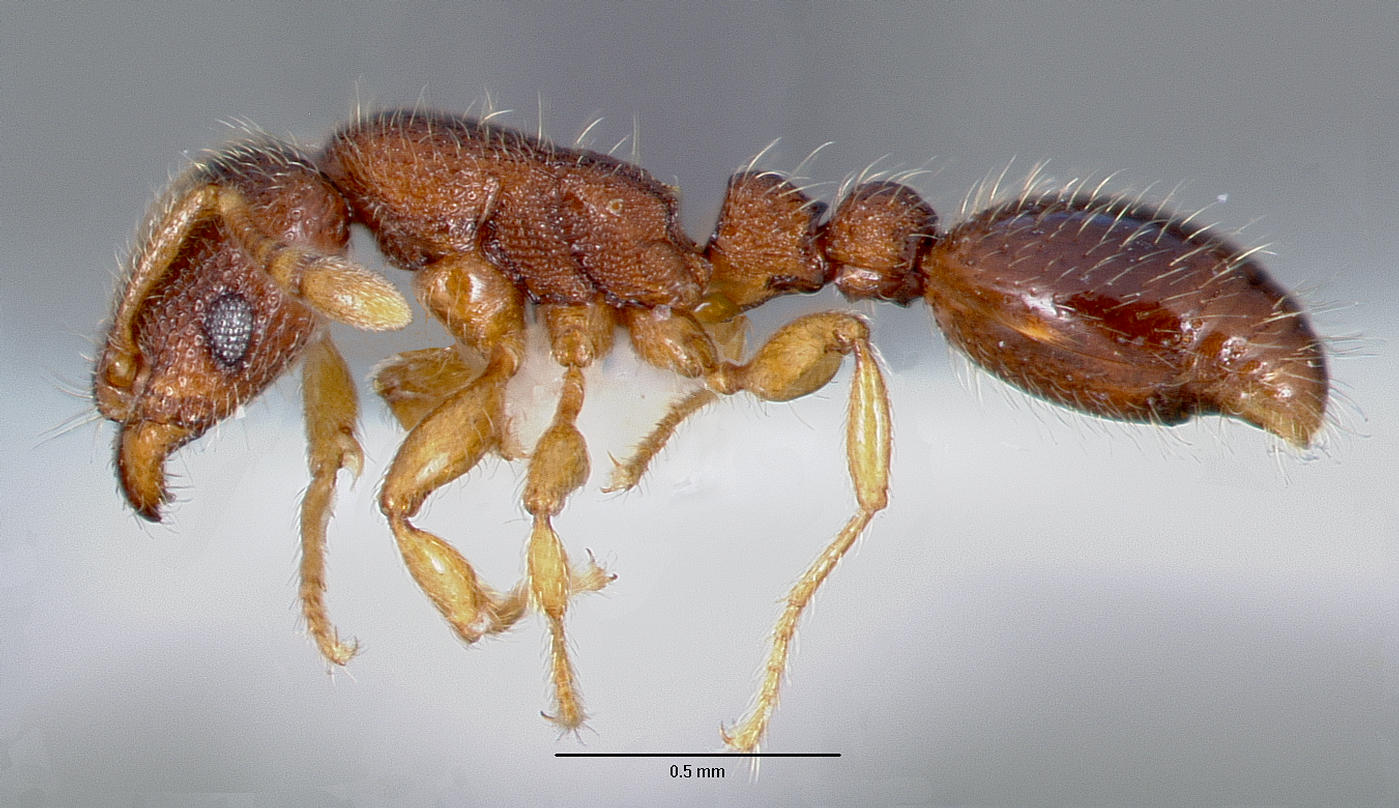

== Subspecies ==
These two subspecies belong to the species Vollenhovia emeryi:

- Vollenhovia emeryi chosenica Wheeler, 1928^{i c g}
- Vollenhovia emeryi emeryi Wheeler, 1906^{i c g}

Data sources: i = ITIS, c = Catalogue of Life, g = GBIF, b = Bugguide.net
