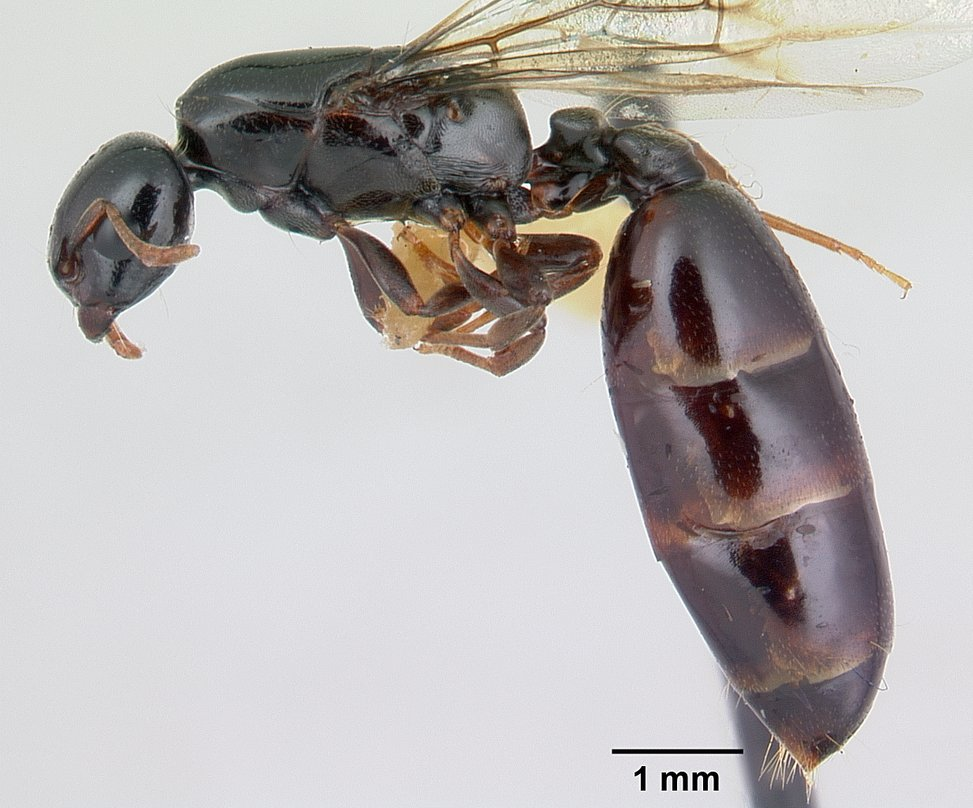
- Liomyrmex gestroi alate queen from the Philippines

Scientific classification
- Kingdom: Animalia
- Phylum: Arthropoda
- Class: Insecta
- Order: Hymenoptera
- Family: Formicidae
- Subfamily: Myrmicinae
- Tribe: Crematogastrini
- Genus: Liomyrmex; Mayr, 1865
- Species: L. gestroi

Binomial name
- Liomyrmex gestroi (Emery, 1887)

= Liomyrmex =

Genus of ants

Liomyrmex is a monotypic genus of ant in the subfamily Myrmicinae; the only species is Liomyrmex gestroi. This genus is known to inhabit Southeast Asia (including Papua New Guinea), South Asia, and parts of Southern China. Individuals in this genus are blind and are known to live among termites in their chambers, but it is relatively unknown as to the purpose of such a relationship.
