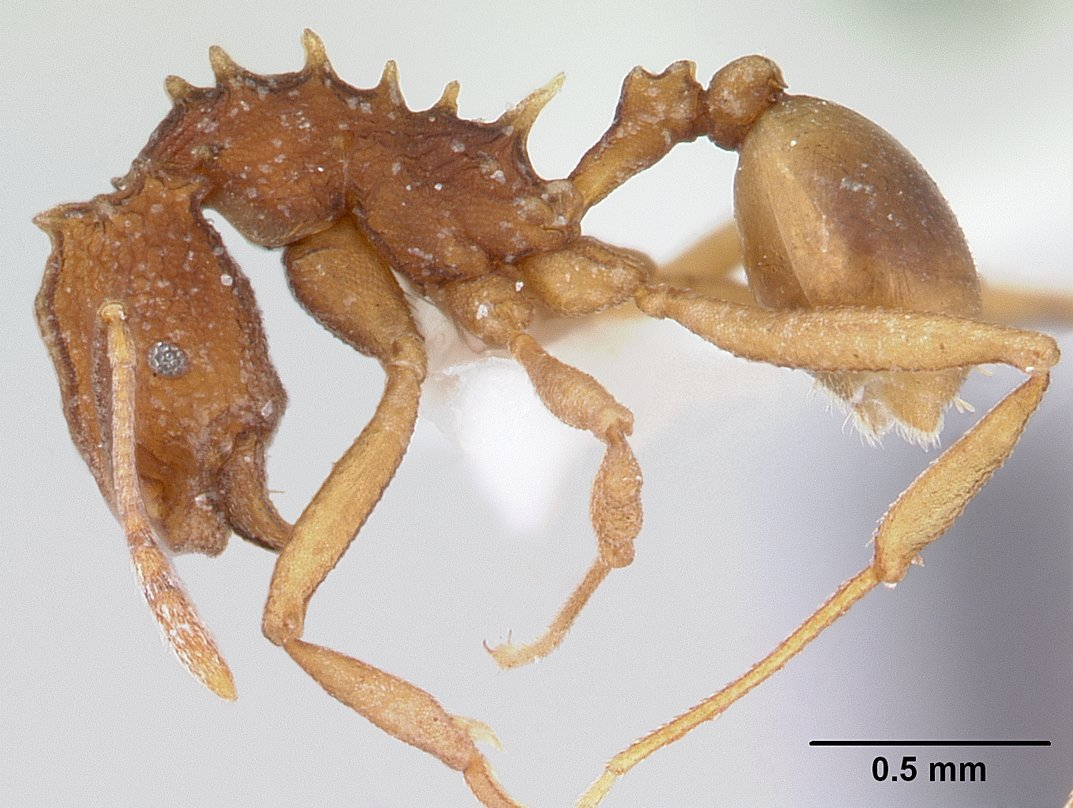
- Proatta butteli worker

Scientific classification
- Kingdom: Animalia
- Phylum: Arthropoda
- Class: Insecta
- Order: Hymenoptera
- Family: Formicidae
- Subfamily: Myrmicinae
- Tribe: Crematogastrini
- Genus: Proatta; Forel, 1912
- Species: P. butteli

Binomial name
- Proatta butteli Forel, 1912

= Proatta =

Genus of ants

Proatta is a Southeast Asian genus of myrmicine ants containing the single species Proatta butteli known from the Malay Peninsula, Borneo and Sumatra.

== Biology ==
Due to morphological similarities with the fungus-growing ants, Emery (1922) placed the genus within the tribe Attini. Weber (1958) attributed the shared similarities to convergent evolution, and Bolton (2003) finally moved the genus to Stenammini. Unlike the attines of the New World, Proatta species are predators and scavengers, and while fungus may grow in refuse piles in the nest, the ants do not actively cultivate fungus.
