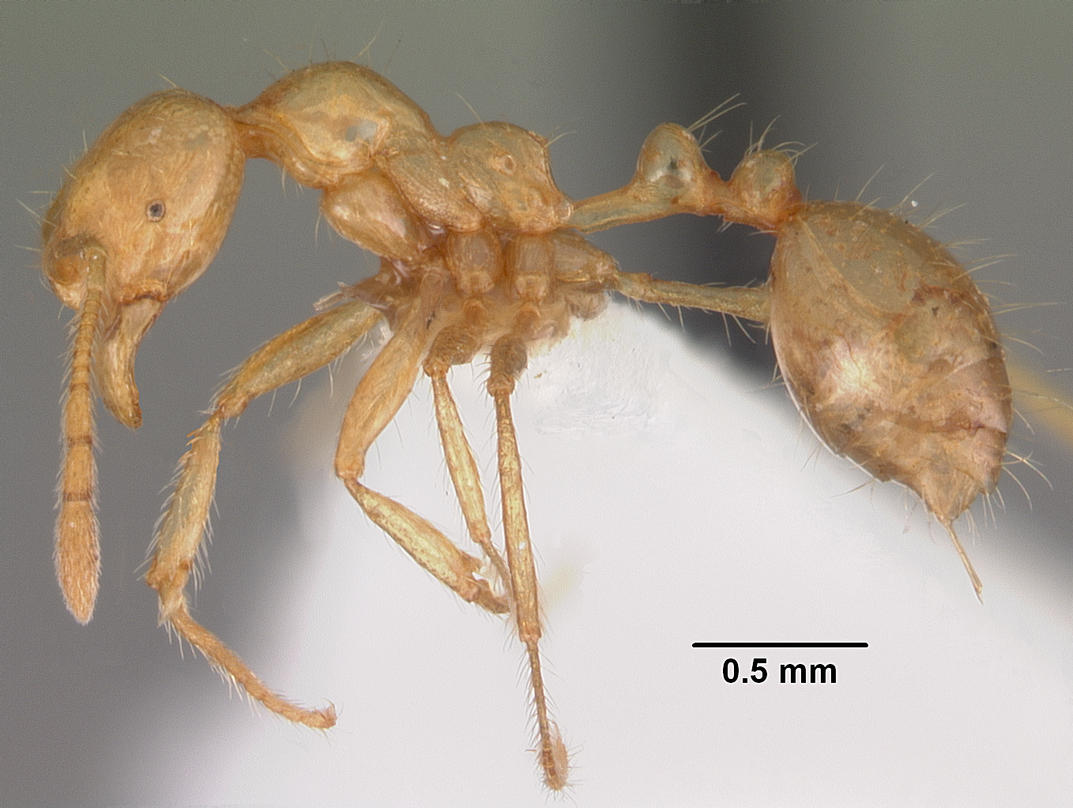
- Epelysidris brocha worker

Scientific classification
- Domain: Eukaryota
- Kingdom: Animalia
- Phylum: Arthropoda
- Class: Insecta
- Order: Hymenoptera
- Family: Formicidae
- Subfamily: Myrmicinae
- Tribe: Solenopsidini
- Genus: Epelysidris; Bolton, 1987
- Species: E. brocha

Binomial name
- Epelysidris brocha Bolton, 1987

= Epelysidris =

Genus of ants

Epelysidris brocha is the only species of ant in the genus Epelysidris. Described by Barry Bolton in 1987 in Borneo, the species is only known from soil in tropical and moss rainforests, based on two known specimen collections.
