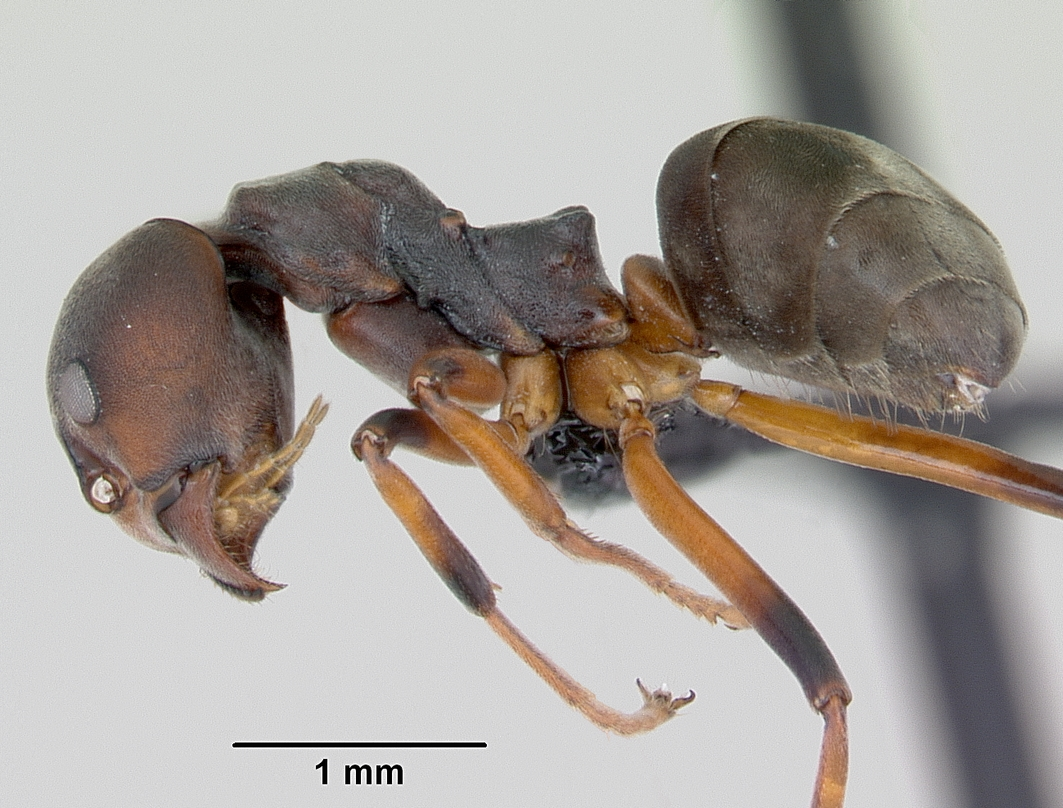

Scientific classification
- Kingdom: Animalia
- Phylum: Arthropoda
- Class: Insecta
- Order: Hymenoptera
- Family: Formicidae
- Subfamily: Dolichoderinae
- Genus: Dolichoderus
- Species: D. erectilobus

Binomial name
- Dolichoderus erectilobus Santschi, 1920

= Dolichoderus erectilobus =

Species of ant

Dolichoderus erectilobus is a species of ant in the genus Dolichoderus. Described by Felix Santschi in 1920, the species occurs in Vietnam and Thailand.

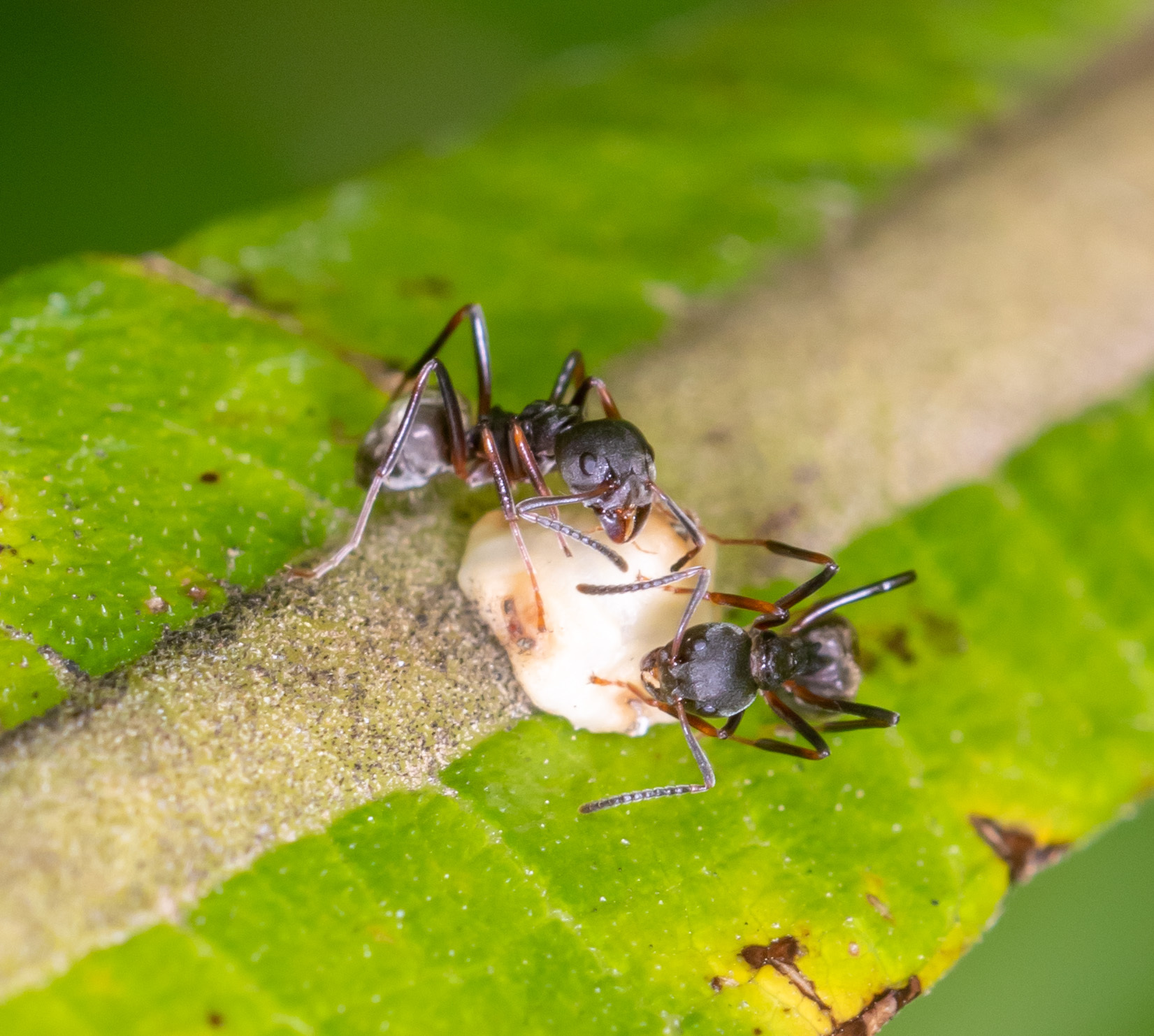
tending to scale insects in Thailand
