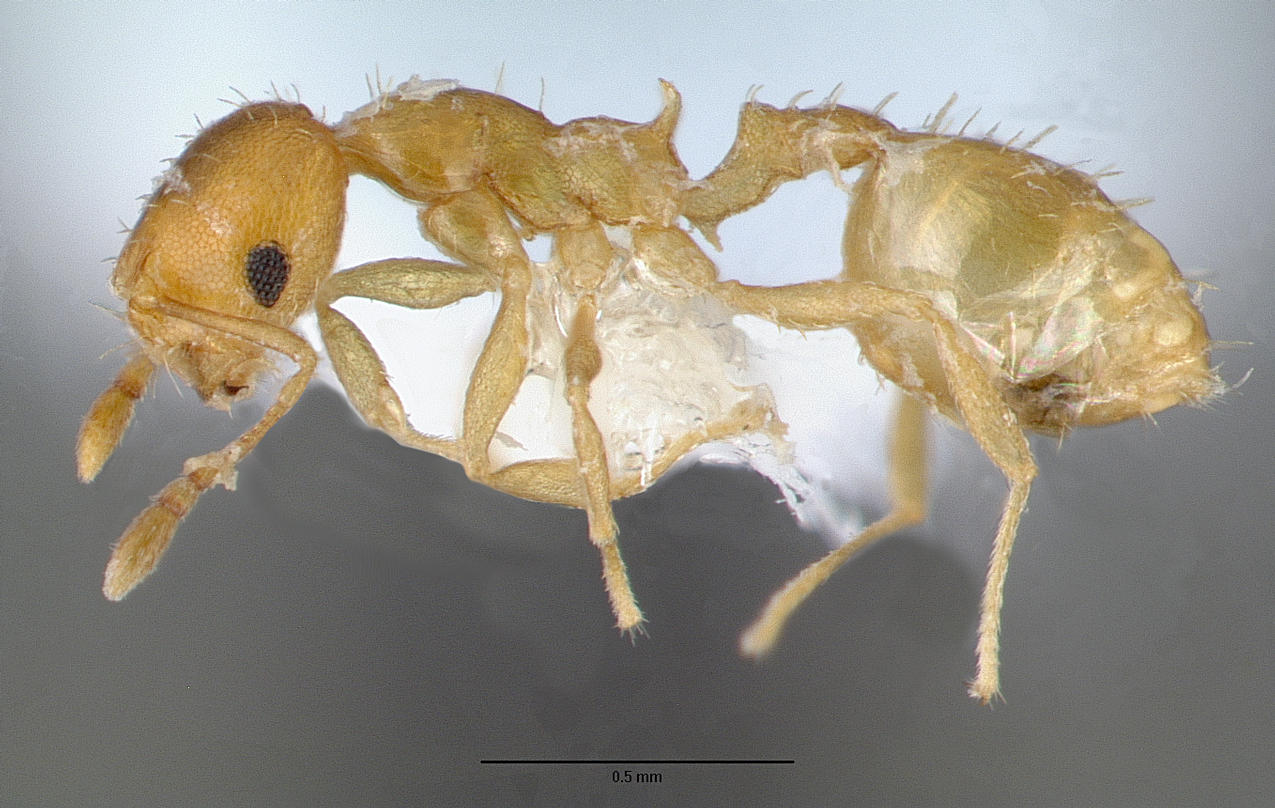
- Recurvidris recurvispinosa worker

Scientific classification
- Domain: Eukaryota
- Kingdom: Animalia
- Phylum: Arthropoda
- Class: Insecta
- Order: Hymenoptera
- Family: Formicidae
- Subfamily: Myrmicinae
- Tribe: Crematogastrini
- Genus: Recurvidris; Bolton, 1992

Diversity
- 10 species

= Recurvidris =

Genus of ants

Recurvidris is a genus of ants in the subfamily Myrmicinae. The genus is distributed in the Indomalayan realm, where the ants are found on the forest floor.

== Species ==
- Recurvidris browni Bolton, 1992
- Recurvidris glabriceps Zhou, 2000
- Recurvidris hebe Bolton, 1992
- Recurvidris kemneri (Wheeler & Wheeler, 1954)
- Recurvidris lekakuli Jaitrong, Tokeeree & Pitaktunsakul, 2019
- Recurvidris nigrans Zettel, 2008
- Recurvidris nuwa Xu & Zheng, 1995
- Recurvidris pickburni Bolton, 1992
- Recurvidris proles Bolton, 1992
- Recurvidris recurvispinosa (Forel, 1890)
- Recurvidris williami Bolton, 1992
