= Crematogaster dohrni =

Scientific classification
- Kingdom: Animalia
- Phylum: Arthropoda
- Clade: Pancrustacea
- Class: Insecta
- Order: Hymenoptera
- Family: Formicidae
- Subfamily: Myrmicinae
- Genus: Crematogaster
- Species: C. dohrni

Binomial name
- Crematogaster dohrni Mayr, 1879

Species of ant

Crematogaster dohrni, is a species of ant of the subfamily Myrmicinae, which is a widespread species that can be found from Sri Lanka, India, Indonesia, Thailand, and China.

== Subspecies ==
- Crematogaster dohrni artifex Mayr, 1879 - India, Thailand, China
- Crematogaster dohrni dohrni Mayr, 1879 - Sri Lanka, China
- Crematogaster dohrni fabricans Forel, 1911 - Indonesia
- Crematogaster dohrni gigas Forel, 1913 - Sri Lanka
- Crematogaster dohrni kerri Forel, 1911 - Thailand
- Crematogaster dohrni kiangsiensis Forel, 1903 - China

== Behavior and ecology ==
Crematogasterdohrni is one of multiple ant species known to tend to scale insects, with this species in particular being known to feed on the honeydew excretions of Saissetia formicarii on tea bushes in Assam and West Bengal. This ant however only tends to small numbers of scale insects, and the bulk of their diet comes from other sources, with insects visiting or feeding on the tea bushes being their main prey. C. dohrni is known to transport these scale insects, being their main method of dispersal, and does so to move the scale insects to more favorable sites.

This ant is also known to live in mutualistic association with myrmecophytes. While the ant protects these plants from herbivores, it also has negative impacts on the fruit production of Humboldtia brunonis.

C. dohrni was one of the most abundant species in the gut contents of a juvenile Chinese pangolin found in Hong Kong after the mammal was killed by dogs on November 24, 2013.
