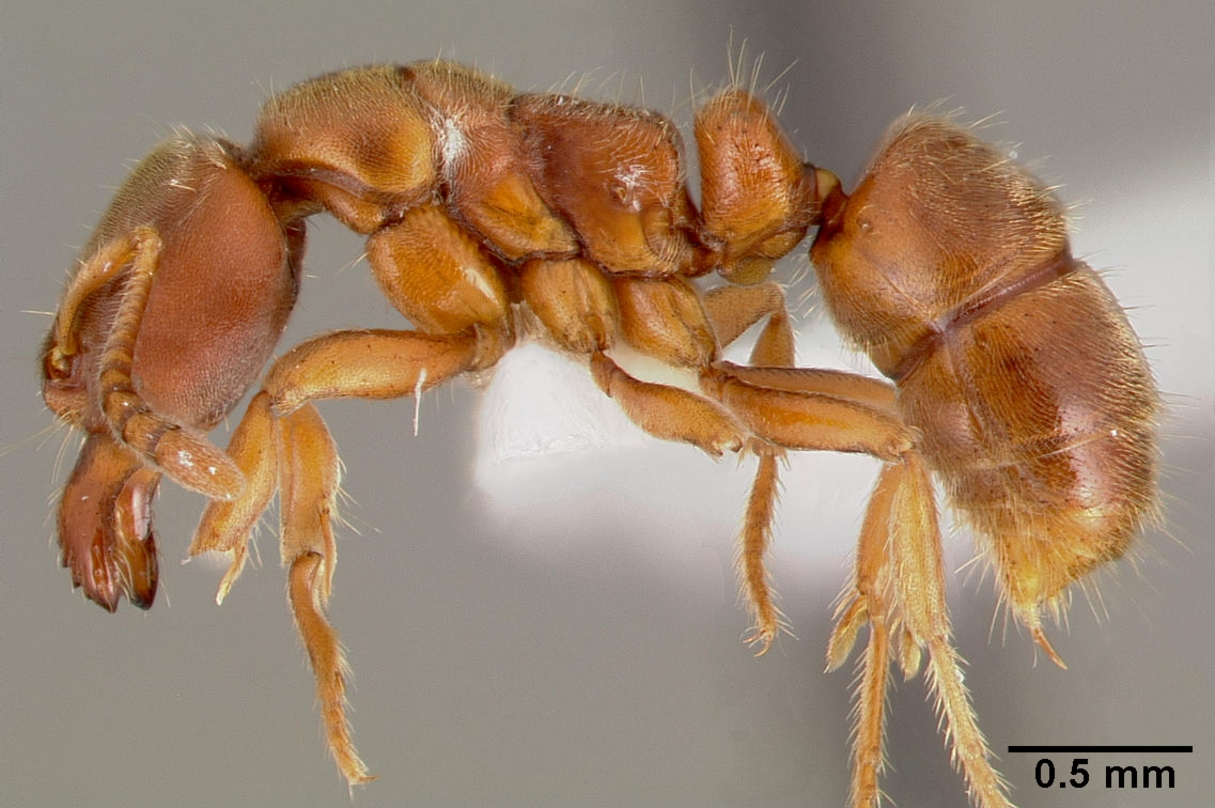
- Cryptopone gilva worker

Scientific classification
- Kingdom: Animalia
- Phylum: Arthropoda
- Class: Insecta
- Order: Hymenoptera
- Family: Formicidae
- Subfamily: Ponerinae
- Tribe: Ponerini
- Genus: Cryptopone; Emery, 1893

Type species
- Cryptopone testacea Emery, 1893

Diversity
- 23 species

= Cryptopone =

Genus of ants

Cryptopone is a genus of ponerine ants containing 23 valid species, all of which are extant. The genus has a worldwide distribution, with most species occurring in Asia. Workers range from very small to medium in size (1.7–6.1 mm), with the queens being slightly larger. Wadeura was previously synonymized under this genus, however, its two species (now four) were separated out again by Branstetter & Longino, 2022.

== Species ==
- Cryptopone arabica Collingwood & Agosti, 1996
- Cryptopone butteli Forel, 1913
- Cryptopone crassicornis (Emery, 1897)
- Cryptopone fusciceps Emery, 1900
- Cryptopone gigas Wu & Wang, 1995
- Cryptopone gilva (Roger, 1863)
- Cryptopone gilvagrande Branstetter & Longino, 2022
- Cryptopone gilvatumida Branstetter & Longino, 2022
- Cryptopone guatemalensis (Forel, 1899)
- Cryptopone jinxiuensis Zhou, 2001
- Cryptopone motschulskyi Donisthorpe, 1943
- Cryptopone nicobarensis Forel, 1905
- Cryptopone ochracea (Mayr, 1855)
- Cryptopone odax (Schmidt & Shattuck, 2014)
- Cryptopone pseudogigas Zhou & Zheng, 1997
- Cryptopone recticlypea Xu, 1998
- Cryptopone rotundiceps (Emery, 1914)
- Cryptopone sauteri (Wheeler, 1906)
- Cryptopone sinensis Wang, 1992
- Cryptopone subterranea Bharti & Wachkoo, 2013
- †Cryptopone succinea (Mayr, 1868)
- Cryptopone taivanae (Forel, 1913)
- Cryptopone tengu Terayama, 1999
- Cryptopone testacea Emery, 1893
- Cryptopone typhlos (Karavaiev, 1935)
