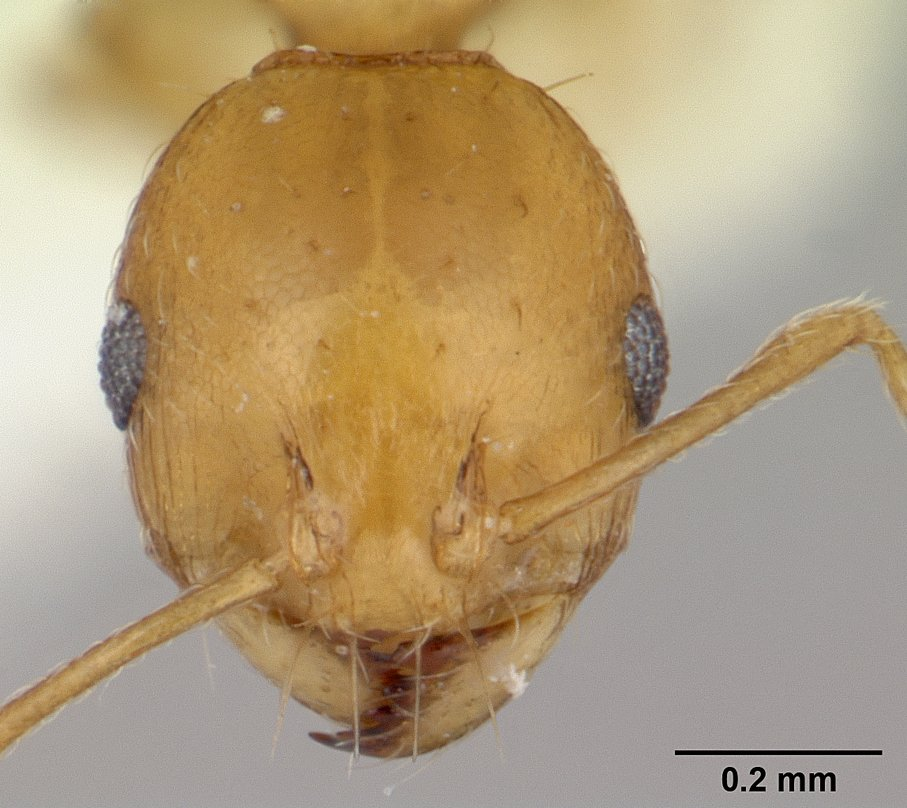

Scientific classification
- Kingdom: Animalia
- Phylum: Arthropoda
- Clade: Pancrustacea
- Class: Insecta
- Order: Hymenoptera
- Family: Formicidae
- Subfamily: Myrmicinae
- Genus: Recurvidris
- Species: R. browni

Binomial name
- Recurvidris browni Bolton, 1992

= Recurvidris browni =

Species of ant

Recurvidris browni is a species of ant of the subfamily Myrmicinae, which can be found from Indonesia (Kalimantan), Malaysia (Sarawak and West Malaysia) and Thailand. The size of the ant is about 2.50–2.60 mm. Its body colour is yellow.

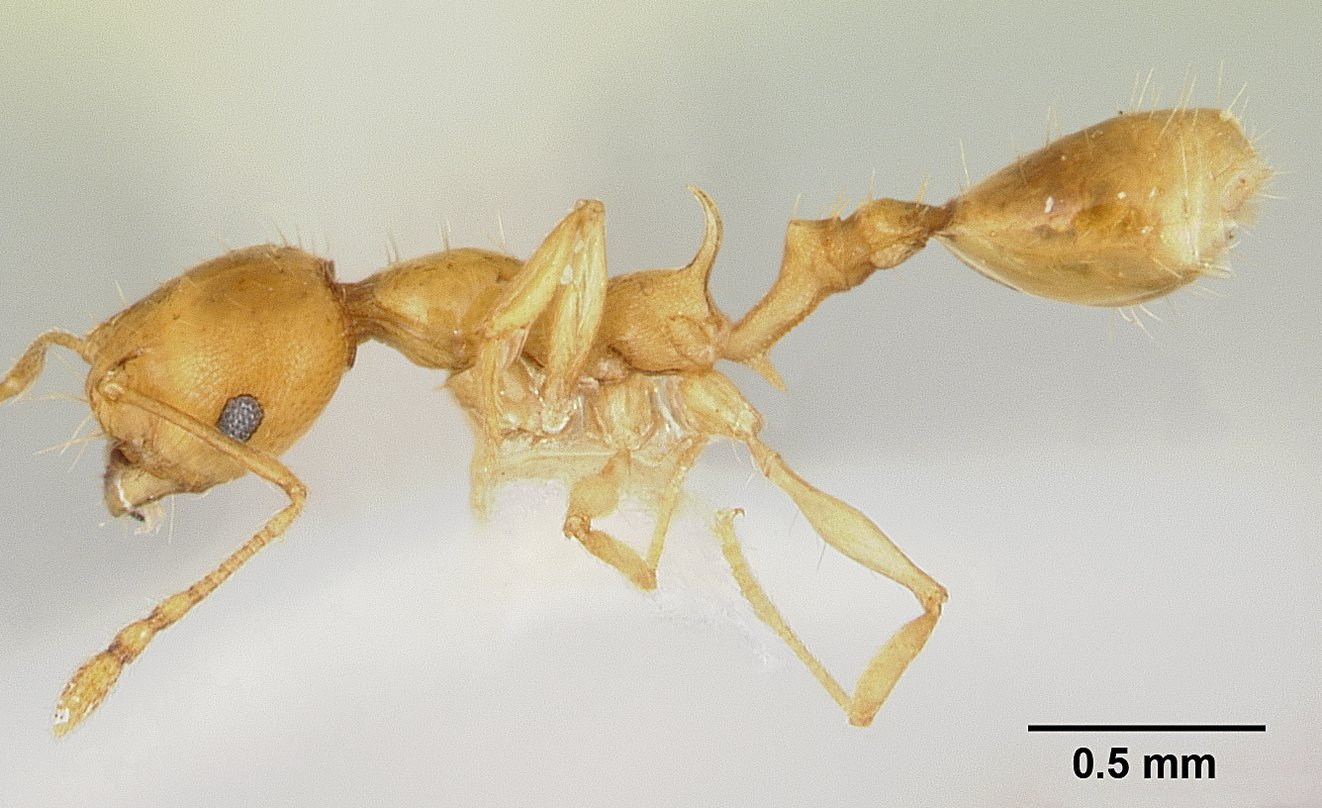
Workers of R. browni
