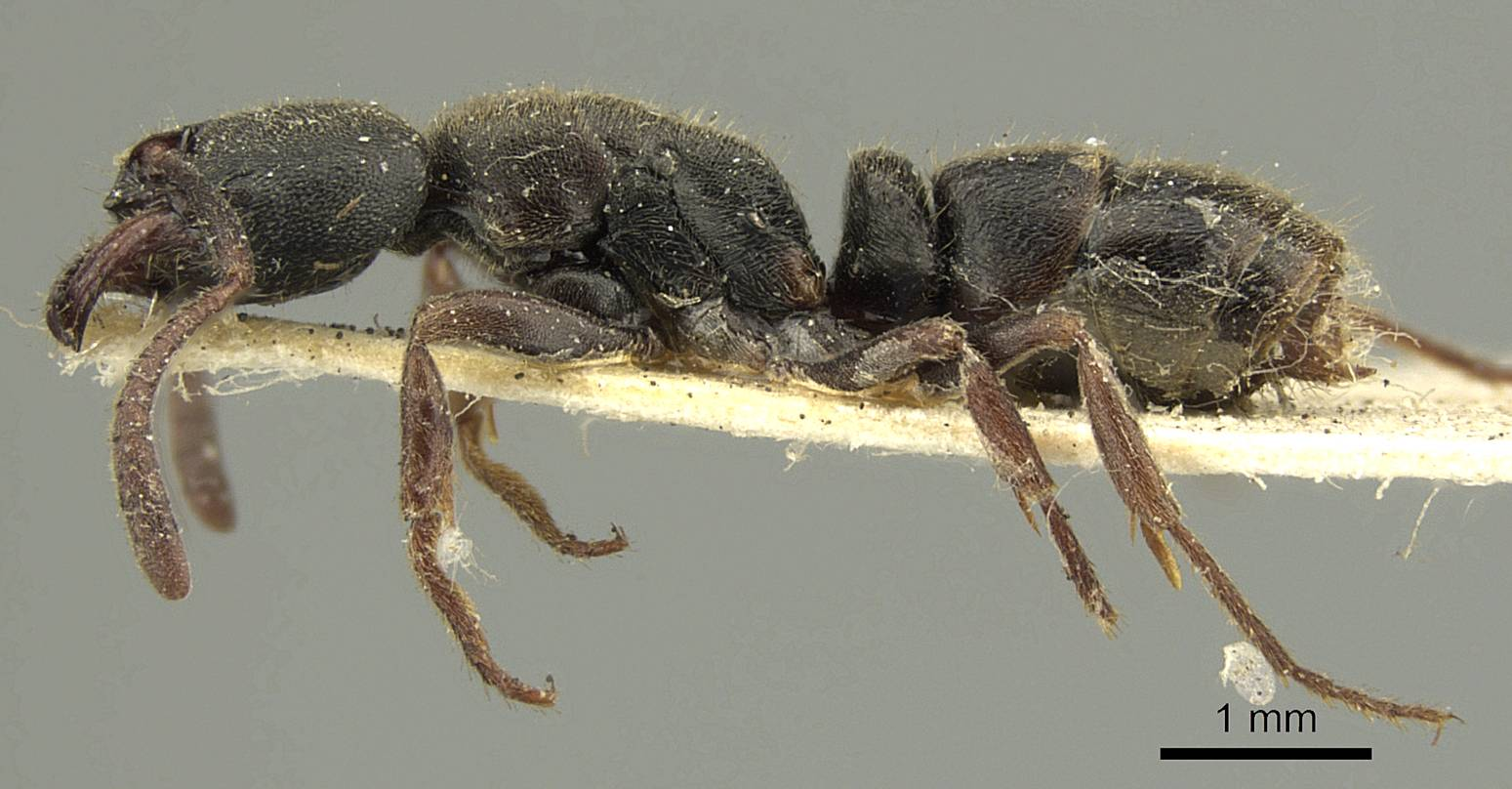
- Ectomomyrmex insulanus

Scientific classification
- Kingdom: Animalia
- Phylum: Arthropoda
- Class: Insecta
- Order: Hymenoptera
- Family: Formicidae
- Subfamily: Ponerinae
- Tribe: Ponerini
- Genus: Ectomomyrmex; Mayr, 1867

Type species
- Ectomomyrmex javanus Mayr, 1867

Diversity
- 27 species

= Ectomomyrmex =

Genus of ants

Ectomomyrmex is a ponerine genus of ants found in Asia and Australia. Little is known about their biology, but they seem to be generalist predators of arthropod prey.

== Species ==
- Ectomomyrmex aciculatus (Emery, 1901)
- Ectomomyrmex acutus (Emery, 1900)
- Ectomomyrmex aequalis Mann, 1919
- Ectomomyrmex annamitus (André, 1892)
- Ectomomyrmex apicalis (Smith, 1857)
- Ectomomyrmex astutus (Smith, 1858)
- Ectomomyrmex claudatus Menozzi, 1926
- Ectomomyrmex exaratus (Emery, 1901)
- Ectomomyrmex insulanus (Mayr, 1876)
- Ectomomyrmex javanus Mayr, 1867
- Ectomomyrmex leeuwenhoeki (Forel, 1886)
- Ectomomyrmex lobocarenus (Xu, 1995)
- Ectomomyrmex melancholicus (Smith, 1865)
- Ectomomyrmex modiglianii Emery, 1900
- Ectomomyrmex obtusus (Emery, 1900)
- Ectomomyrmex overbecki Viehmeyer, 1916
- Ectomomyrmex pylixy Fisher, 2025
- Ectomomyrmex pylor Fisher, 2025
- Ectomomyrmex ruficornis Clark, 1934
- Ectomomyrmex scobinus Wilson, 1958
- Ectomomyrmex simillimus (Donisthorpe, 1949)
- Ectomomyrmex striatulus (Karavaiev, 1935)
- Ectomomyrmex striolatus (Donisthorpe, 1933)
- Ectomomyrmex sumatranus (Özdikmen, 2010)
- Ectomomyrmex tonkinus (Santschi, 1920)
- Ectomomyrmex vermiculatus (Emery, 1897)
- Ectomomyrmex zhengi Xu, 1995
