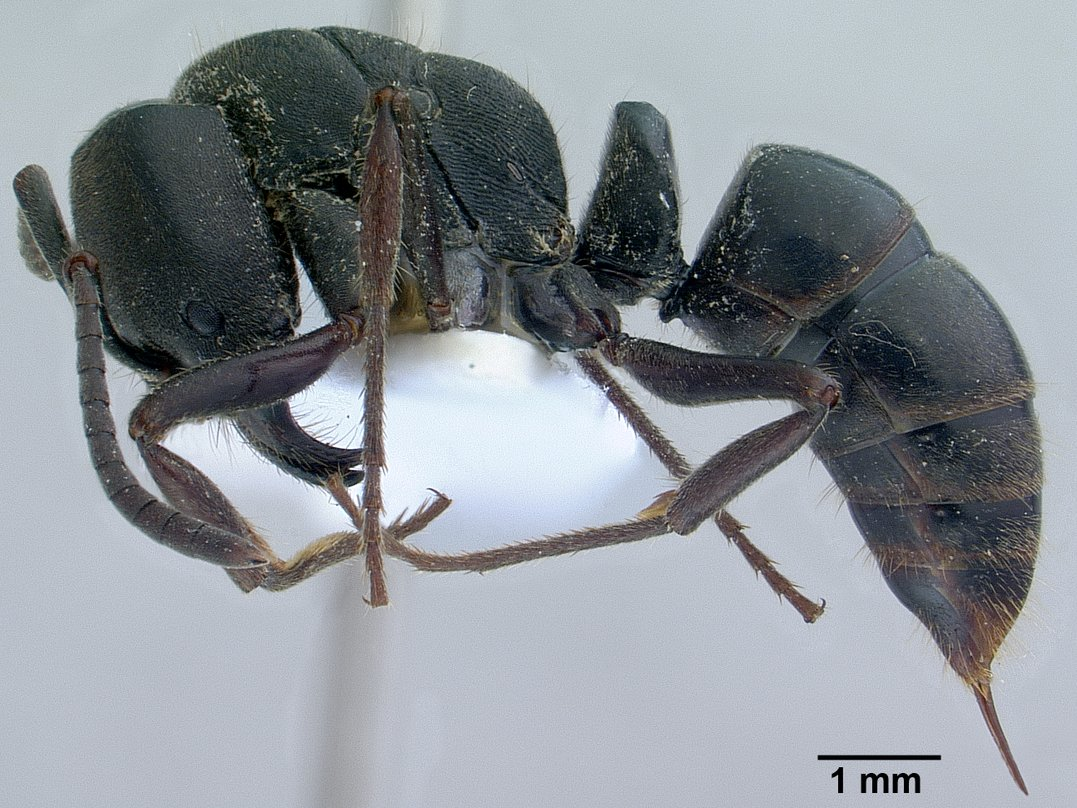

Scientific classification
- Kingdom: Animalia
- Phylum: Arthropoda
- Class: Insecta
- Order: Hymenoptera
- Family: Formicidae
- Genus: Ectomomyrmex
- Species: E. astutus

Binomial name
- Ectomomyrmex astutus (Smith, F., 1858)

Subspecies
- Ectomomyrmex astutus obscurus Karavaiev, 1935

= Ectomomyrmex astutus =

Species of ant

Ectomomyrmex astutus is a species of ant in the genus Ectomomyrmex. Described by Smith in 1858, the species is endemic to Asia and Australia.
