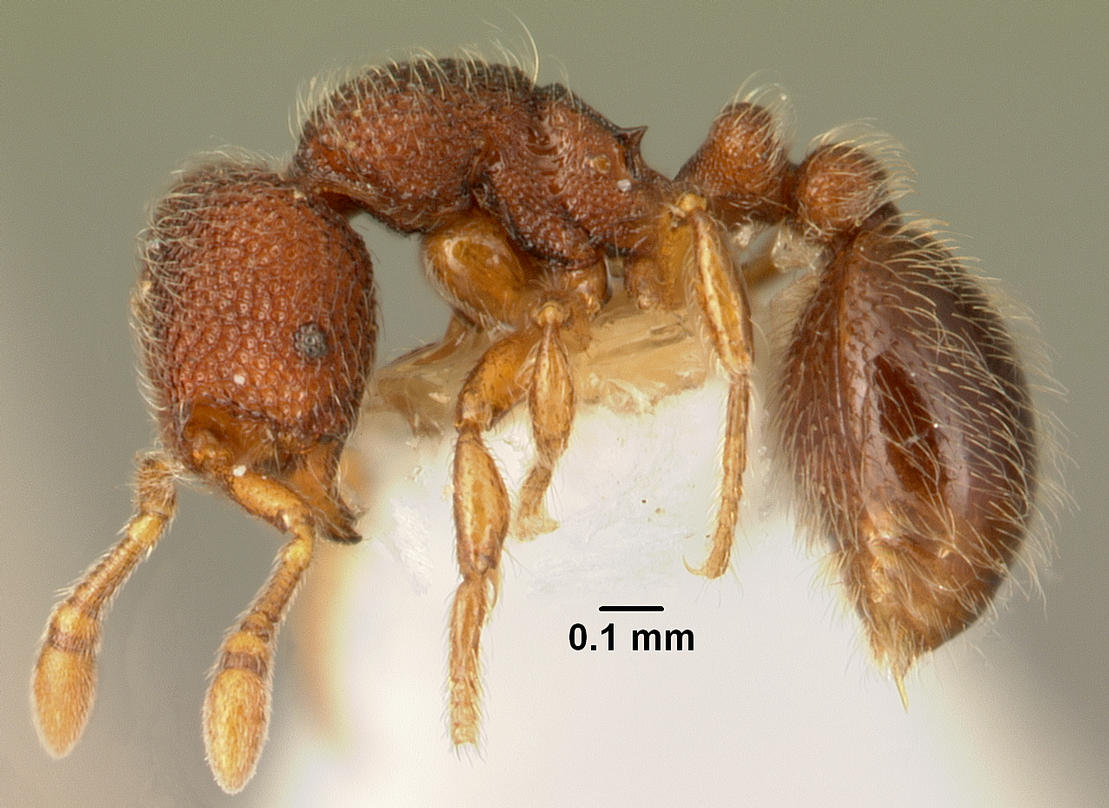
- Tetheamyrma subspongia worker

Scientific classification
- Kingdom: Animalia
- Phylum: Arthropoda
- Class: Insecta
- Order: Hymenoptera
- Family: Formicidae
- Subfamily: Myrmicinae
- Tribe: Crematogastrini
- Alliance: Mayriella genus group
- Genus: Tetheamyrma; Bolton, 1991

Type species
- Tetheamyrma subspongia

Diversity
- 2 species

= Tetheamyrma =

Genus of ants

Tetheamyrma is a genus of ants in the subfamily Myrmicinae containing two species. The genus is known from parts of Southeast Asia.

== Species ==
- Tetheamyrma bidentata General & Buenavente, 2018
- Tetheamyrma subspongia Bolton, 1991
