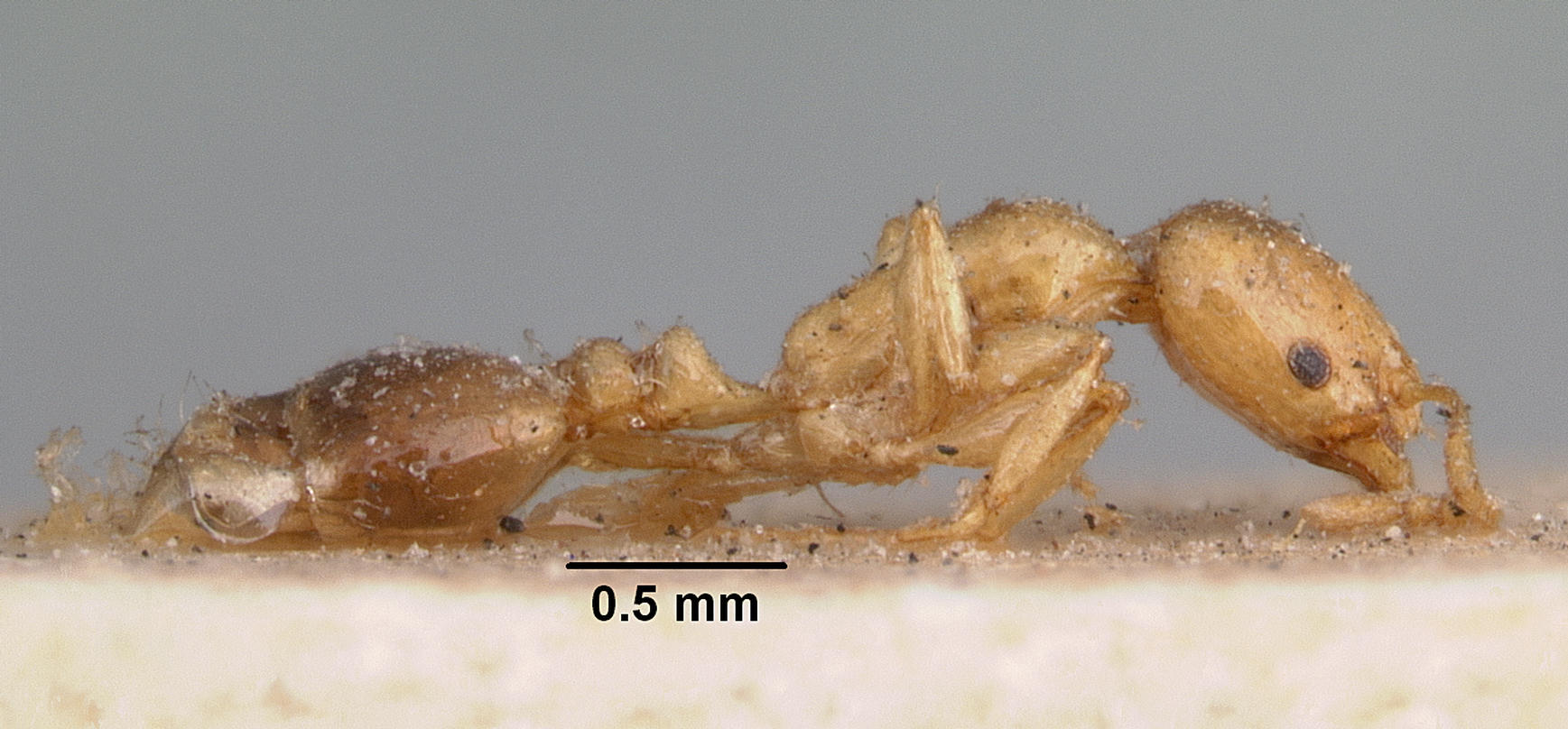

Scientific classification
- Kingdom: Animalia
- Phylum: Arthropoda
- Class: Insecta
- Order: Hymenoptera
- Family: Formicidae
- Subfamily: Myrmicinae
- Tribe: Solenopsidini
- Genus: Erromyrma; Bolton & Fisher, 2016
- Species: E. latinodis

Binomial name
- Erromyrma latinodis (Mayr, 1872)

Synonyms
- Monomorium latinode bruneum Emery, 1893; Monomorium voeltzkowi Forel, 1907; Monomorium latinode Mayr, 1872

= Erromyrma =

Species of ant

Erromyrma is a monotypic genus of ants of the subfamily Myrmicinae containing the sole species Erromyrma latinodis. It is found in many Southeast Asian countries.
