= Crematogaster baduvi =

Scientific classification
- Kingdom: Animalia
- Phylum: Arthropoda
- Clade: Pancrustacea
- Class: Insecta
- Order: Hymenoptera
- Family: Formicidae
- Subfamily: Myrmicinae
- Genus: Crematogaster
- Species: C. baduvi

Binomial name
- Crematogaster baduvi Forel, 1912

Species of ant

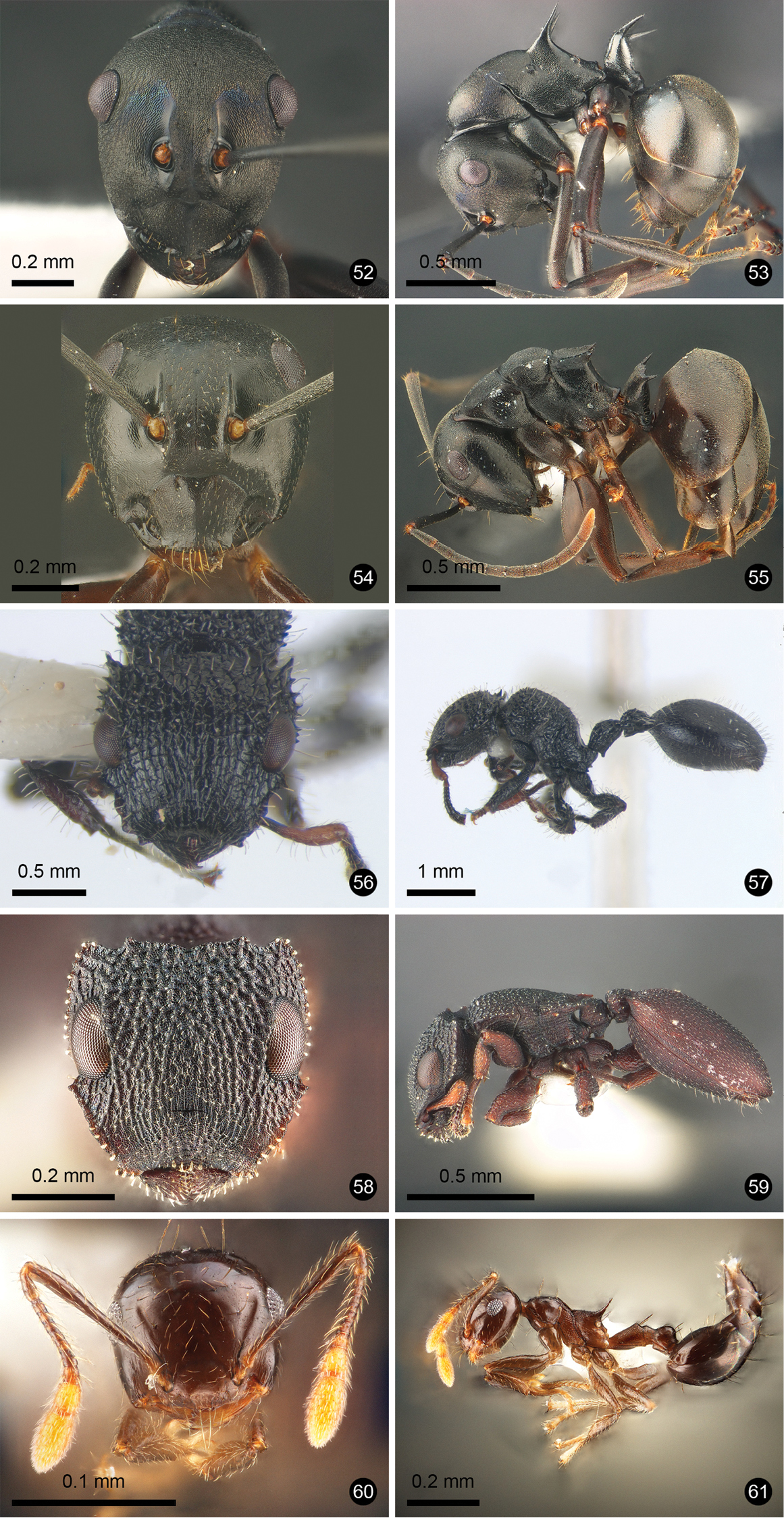
Microscopic images of *Crematogaster baduvi* and other ant species new to Thailand

Crematogaster baduvi is a species of ant in tribe Crematogastrini. It was described by Forel in 1912.
