= Crematogaster aurita =

Scientific classification
- Domain: Eukaryota
- Kingdom: Animalia
- Phylum: Arthropoda
- Class: Insecta
- Order: Hymenoptera
- Family: Formicidae
- Subfamily: Myrmicinae
- Genus: Crematogaster
- Species: C. aurita

Binomial name
- Crematogaster aurita Karavaiev, 1935

Species of ant

Crematogaster aurita is a species of ant in tribe Crematogastrini. It was described by Karavaiev in 1935.
