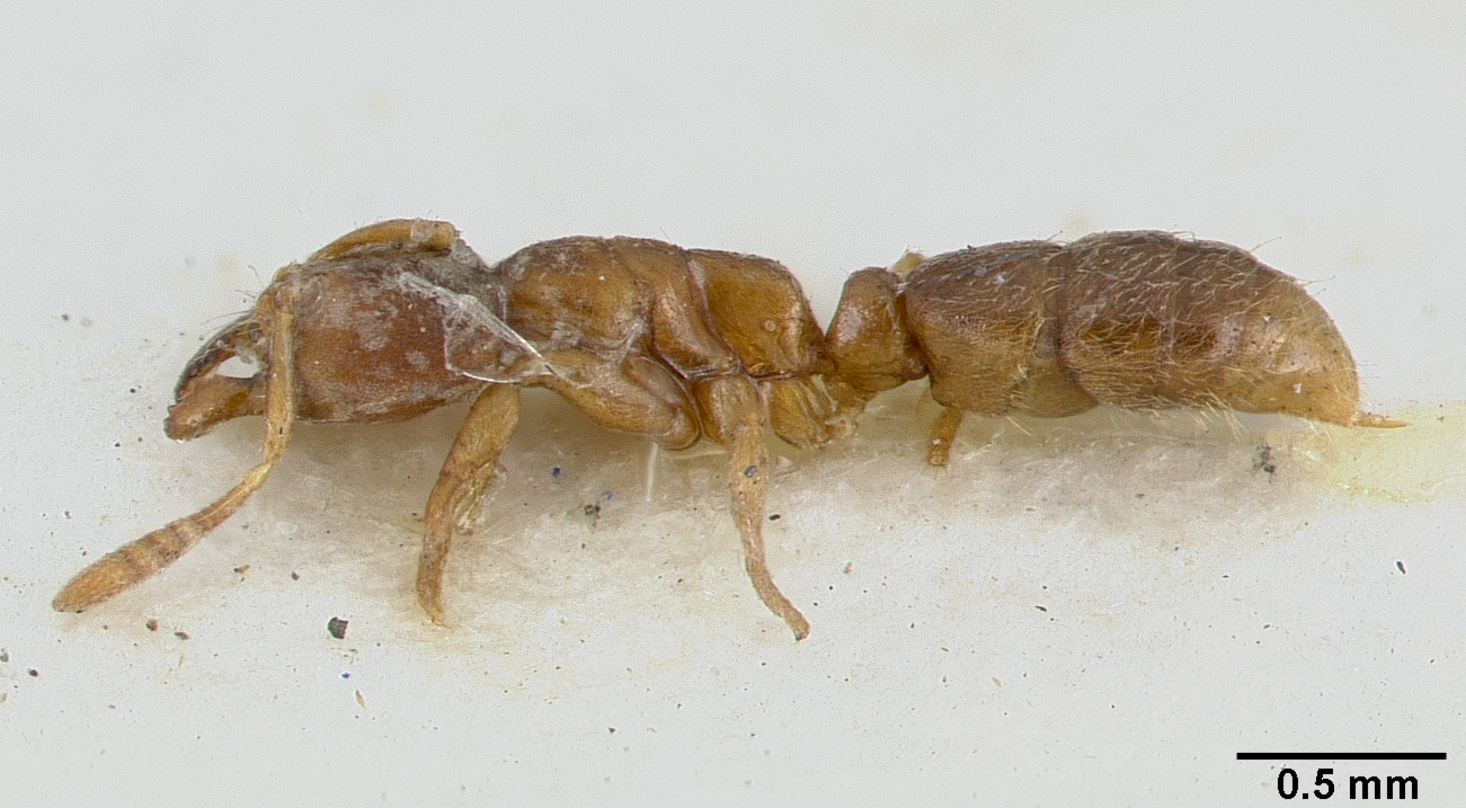

Scientific classification
- Kingdom: Animalia
- Phylum: Arthropoda
- Clade: Pancrustacea
- Class: Insecta
- Order: Hymenoptera
- Family: Formicidae
- Genus: Cryptopone
- Species: C. testacea

Binomial name
- Cryptopone testacea Emery, 1893

Synonyms
- Cryptopone emeryi Donisthorpe, 1943; Cryptopone mayri Mann, 1919; Centromyrmex feae greeni Wheeler, W.M., 1933; Centromyrmex feae feae Wheeler, W.M., 1933

= Cryptopone testacea =

Species of ant

Cryptopone testacea, is a species of ant of the subfamily Ponerinae.
