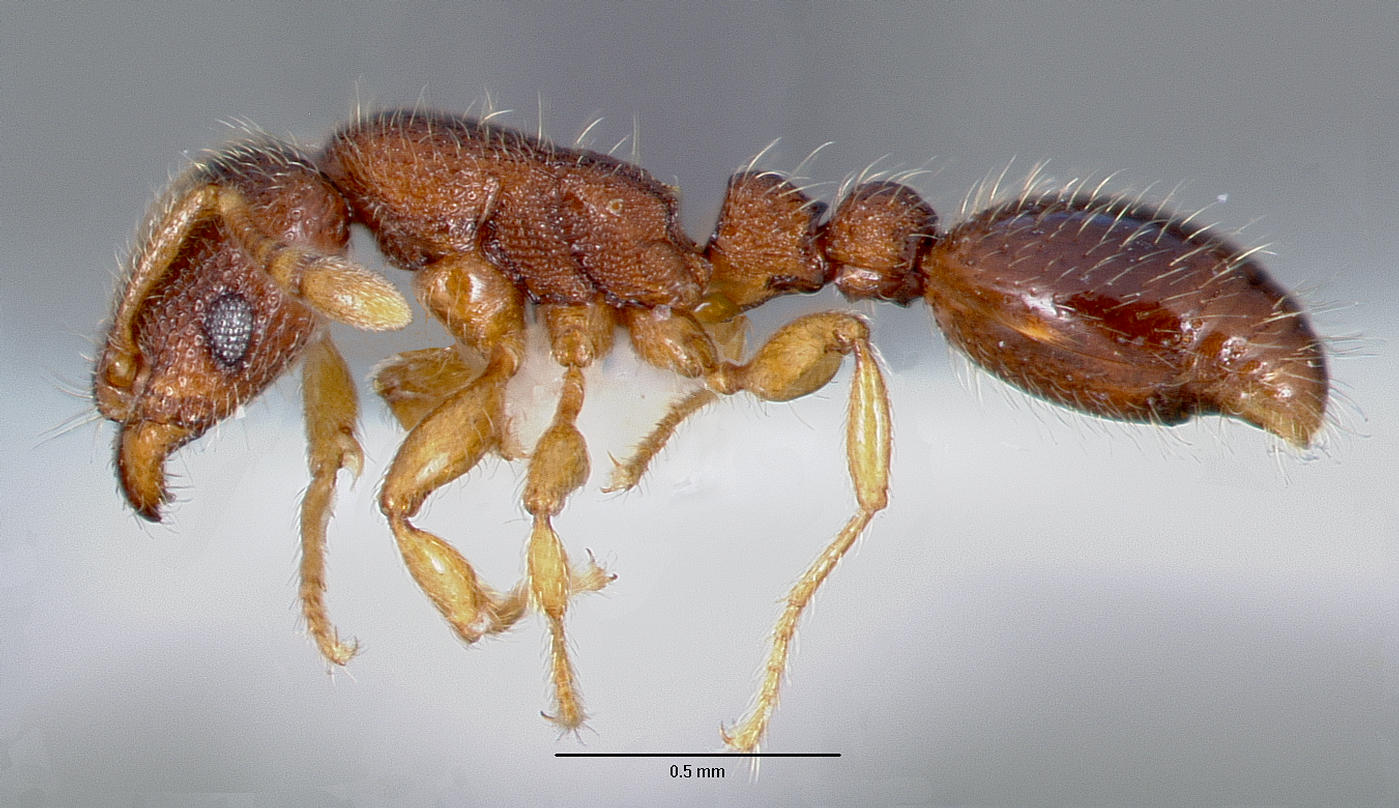
- Vollenhovia emeryi

Scientific classification
- Kingdom: Animalia
- Phylum: Arthropoda
- Class: Insecta
- Order: Hymenoptera
- Family: Formicidae
- Subfamily: Myrmicinae
- Tribe: Crematogastrini
- Genus: Vollenhovia; Mayr, 1865

Type species
- Vollenhovia punctatostriata

Diversity
- 61 species

= Vollenhovia =

Genus of ants

Vollenhovia is a genus of ants in the subfamily Myrmicinae.

== Species ==
- Vollenhovia amamiana Terayama & Kinomura, 1997
- Vollenhovia ambitiosa Menozzi, 1925
- Vollenhovia banksi Forel, 1910
- Vollenhovia benzai Terayama & Kinomura, 1997
- †Vollenhovia beyrichi (Mayr, 1868)
- Vollenhovia brachycera Emery, 1914
- Vollenhovia brevicornis (Emery, 1893)
- Vollenhovia brunnea Donisthorpe, 1947
- Vollenhovia butteli Forel, 1913
- Vollenhovia cristata (Stitz, 1938)
- Vollenhovia dentata Mann, 1919
- Vollenhovia denticulata Emery, 1914
- Vollenhovia duodecimalis Donisthorpe, 1948
- Vollenhovia elysii Mann, 1919
- Vollenhovia emeryi Wheeler, 1906
- Vollenhovia escherichi Forel, 1911
- Vollenhovia foveaceps Mann, 1919
- Vollenhovia fridae Forel, 1913
- Vollenhovia gastropunctata Bharti & Kumar, 2013
- Vollenhovia hewitti Wheeler, 1919
- Vollenhovia irenea (Donisthorpe, 1947)
- Vollenhovia kaselela Clouse, 2007
- Vollenhovia loboii Mann, 1919
- Vollenhovia longicephala (Terayama & Yamane, 1991)
- Vollenhovia longiceps Emery, 1893
- Vollenhovia lucimandibula Wang, Zhou & Huang, 2005
- Vollenhovia luctuosa (Stitz, 1938)
- Vollenhovia menshen Terayama, 2009
- Vollenhovia modiglianii Emery, 1900
- Vollenhovia moesta (Smith, 1863)
- Vollenhovia mwereka Clouse, 2007
- Vollenhovia nipponica Kinomura & Yamauchi, 1992
- Vollenhovia nitida (Smith, 1860)
- Vollenhovia novobritainae (Donisthorpe, 1948)
- Vollenhovia oblonga (Smith, 1860)
- Vollenhovia okinawana Terayama & Kinomura, 1997
- Vollenhovia opacinoda Forel, 1913
- Vollenhovia overbecki Viehmeyer, 1916
- Vollenhovia pacifica Wilson & Taylor, 1967
- Vollenhovia papuana Viehmeyer, 1914
- Vollenhovia penetrans (Smith, 1857)
- Vollenhovia pertinax (Smith, 1861)
- Vollenhovia piroskae Forel, 1912
- †Vollenhovia prisca (André, 1895)
- Vollenhovia punctata Viehmeyer, 1914
- Vollenhovia punctatostriata Mayr, 1865
- Vollenhovia pwidikidika Clouse, 2007
- Vollenhovia pyrrhoria Wu & Xiao, 1989
- Vollenhovia rufipes Donisthorpe, 1949
- Vollenhovia rufiventris Forel, 1901
- Vollenhovia sakishimana Terayama & Kinomura, 1997
- Vollenhovia samoensis Mayr, 1876
- Vollenhovia satoi Santschi, 1937
- Vollenhovia shunfenger Terayama, 2009
- Vollenhovia simoides Emery, 1897
- Vollenhovia soleaferrea Donisthorpe, 1942
- Vollenhovia subtilis Emery, 1887
- Vollenhovia umbilicata Donisthorpe, 1941
- Vollenhovia undecimalis Donisthorpe, 1948
- Vollenhovia xingjun Terayama, 2009
- Vollenhovia yambaru Terayama, 1999
