= List of Leptogenys species =

This is a list of 324 species in Leptogenys, a genus of ponerine ants distributed globally in the tropics.

== List ==
=== Extant species ===
- Leptogenys academica López-Muñoz et al., 2018
- Leptogenys acutangula Emery, 1914
- Leptogenys acutirostris Santschi, 1912
- Leptogenys adlerzi Forel, 1900
- Leptogenys alamando Rakotonirina & Fisher, 2014
- Leptogenys alatapia Rakotonirina & Fisher, 2014
- Leptogenys alluaudi Emery, 1895
- Leptogenys amazonica Borgmeier, 1930
- Leptogenys ambo Rakotonirina & Fisher, 2014
- Leptogenys amon Bolton, 1975
- Leptogenys amu Lattke, 2011
- Leptogenys andritantely Rakotonirina & Fisher, 2014
- Leptogenys angusta (Forel, 1892)
- Leptogenys angustinoda Clark, 1934
- Leptogenys anitae Forel, 1915
- Leptogenys anjara Rakotonirina & Fisher, 2014
- Leptogenys ankhesa Bolton, 1975
- Leptogenys antillana Wheeler, 1914
- Leptogenys antongilensis Emery, 1899
- Leptogenys arcirostris Santschi, 1926
- Leptogenys arcuata Roger, 1861
- Leptogenys arnoldi Forel, 1913
- Leptogenys aspera (Andre, 1889)
- Leptogenys assamensis Forel, 1900
- Leptogenys atra Arimoto & Yamane, 2018
- Leptogenys attenuata (Smith, 1858)
- Leptogenys australis (Emery, 1888)
- Leptogenys avaratra Rakotonirina & Fisher, 2014
- Leptogenys avo Rakotonirina & Fisher, 2014
- Leptogenys barimaso Rakotonirina & Fisher, 2014
- Leptogenys bellii Emery, 1901
- Leptogenys bezanozano Rakotonirina & Fisher, 2014
- Leptogenys bhartii Wachkoo et al., 2018
- Leptogenys bidentata Forel, 1900
- Leptogenys bifida Lattke, 2011
- Leptogenys binghamii Forel, 1900
- Leptogenys birmana Forel, 1900
- Leptogenys bituberculata Emery, 1901
- Leptogenys bohlsi Emery, 1896
- Leptogenys borivava Rakotonirina & Fisher, 2014
- Leptogenys borneensis Wheeler, 1919
- Leptogenys breviceps Viehmeyer, 1914
- Leptogenys breviloba Arimoto, 2017
- Leptogenys bubastis Bolton, 1975
- Leptogenys buyssoni Forel, 1907
- Leptogenys caeciliae Viehmeyer, 1912
- Leptogenys camerunensis Stitz, 1910
- Leptogenys carbonaria Lattke, 2011
- Leptogenys carinata Donisthorpe, 1943
- Leptogenys carioca López-Muñoz et al., 2018
- Leptogenys castanea (Mayr, 1862)
- Leptogenys centralis Wheeler, 1915
- Leptogenys chalybaea (Emery, 1887)
- Leptogenys chamela Lattke, 2011
- Leptogenys chelifera (Santschi, 1928)
- Leptogenys chinensis (Mayr, 1870)
- Leptogenys chrislaini Rakotonirina & Fisher, 2014
- Leptogenys ciliata Lattke, 2011
- Leptogenys clarki Wheeler, 1933
- Leptogenys coerulescens Emery, 1895
- Leptogenys comajojo Rakotonirina & Fisher, 2014
- Leptogenys confucii Forel, 1912
- Leptogenys conigera (Mayr, 1876)
- Leptogenys conradti Forel, 1913
- Leptogenys consanguinea Wheeler, 1909
- Leptogenys cordoba Lattke, 2011
- Leptogenys corniculans Lattke, 2011
- Leptogenys cracens Lattke, 2011
- Leptogenys crassicornis Emery, 1895
- Leptogenys crassinoda Arnold, 1926
- Leptogenys crudelis (Smith, 1858)
- Leptogenys crustosa Santschi, 1914
- Leptogenys cryptica Bolton, 1975
- Leptogenys cuneata Lattke, 2011
- Leptogenys curva Arimoto, 2017
- Leptogenys cyanicatena Arimoto & Yamane, 2018
- Leptogenys dalyi Forel, 1900
- Leptogenys darlingtoni Wheeler, 1933
- Leptogenys davydovi Karavaiev, 1935
- Leptogenys deborae Lattke, 2011
- Leptogenys dentilobis Forel, 1900
- Leptogenys diana Rakotonirina & Fisher, 2014
- Leptogenys diatra Bolton, 1975
- Leptogenys diminuta (Smith, 1857)
- Leptogenys donisthorpei Mann, 1922
- Leptogenys drepanon Wilson, 1958
- Leptogenys ebenina Forel, 1915
- Leptogenys edsoni Rakotonirina & Fisher, 2014
- Leptogenys elegans Bolton, 1975
- Leptogenys elongata (Buckley, 1866)
- Leptogenys elzasoares Tozetto et al., 2022
- Leptogenys emeryi Forel, 1901
- Leptogenys emiliae Forel, 1902
- Leptogenys ergatogyna Wheeler, 1922
- Leptogenys erugata Lattke, 2011
- Leptogenys erythraea Emery, 1902
- Leptogenys excellens Bolton, 1975
- Leptogenys excisa (Mayr, 1876)
- Leptogenys exigua (Crawley, 1921)
- Leptogenys exundans (Walker, 1859)
- Leptogenys falcigera Roger, 1861
- Leptogenys fallax (Mayr, 1876)
- Leptogenys famelica Emery, 1896
- Leptogenys fasika Rakotonirina & Fisher, 2014
- Leptogenys ferrarii Forel, 1913
- Leptogenys fiandry Rakotonirina & Fisher, 2014
- Leptogenys foraminosa Lattke, 2011
- Leptogenys foreli Mann, 1919
- Leptogenys fortior Forel, 1900
- Leptogenys fotsivava Rakotonirina & Fisher, 2014
- Leptogenys foveonates Lattke, 2011
- Leptogenys foveopunctata Mann, 1921
- Leptogenys fugax Mann, 1921
- Leptogenys furtiva Arnold, 1926
- Leptogenys gagates Mann, 1922
- Leptogenys gaigei Wheeler, 1923
- Leptogenys gatu Lattke, 2011
- Leptogenys glabra Lattke, 2011
- Leptogenys gorgona Lattke, 2011
- Leptogenys gracilis Emery, 1899
- Leptogenys grandidieri Forel, 1910
- Leptogenys grohli Hamer et al., 2024
- Leptogenys guianensis Wheeler, 1923
- Leptogenys guineensis Santschi, 1914
- Leptogenys hackeri Clark, 1934
- Leptogenys hainanensis Chen et al., 2024
- Leptogenys harmsi Donisthorpe, 1935
- Leptogenys havilandi Forel, 1901
- Leptogenys hebrideana Wilson, 1958
- Leptogenys hemioptica Forel, 1901
- Leptogenys hezhouensis Zhou, 2001
- Leptogenys honduriana Mann, 1922
- Leptogenys honoria Bolton, 1975
- Leptogenys huapingensis Zhou, 2001
- Leptogenys humiliata Mann, 1921
- Leptogenys hysterica Forel, 1900
- Leptogenys iheringi Forel, 1911
- Leptogenys imerinensis Mann, 1922
- Leptogenys imperatrix Mann, 1922
- Leptogenys incisa Forel, 1891
- Leptogenys indagatrix Wilson, 1958
- Leptogenys ingens Mayr, 1866
- Leptogenys intermedia Emery, 1902
- Leptogenys intricata Viehmeyer, 1924
- Leptogenys iridescens (Smith, 1857)
- Leptogenys iridipennis (Smith, 1858)
- Leptogenys itoi Arimoto, 2017
- Leptogenys ixta Lattke, 2011
- Leptogenys jeanettei Mathew & Tiwari, 2000
- Leptogenys jeanneli Santschi, 1914
- Leptogenys johary Rakotonirina & Fisher, 2014
- Leptogenys josephi Mackay & MacKay, 2004
- Leptogenys kanaoi Arimoto, 2017
- Leptogenys karawaiewi Santschi, 1928
- Leptogenys keysseri Viehmeyer, 1914
- Leptogenys khammouanensis Roncin & Deharveng, 2003
- Leptogenys khaura Bolton, 1975
- Leptogenys kiche Lattke, 2011
- Leptogenys kitteli (Mayr, 1870)
- Leptogenys kraepelini Forel, 1905
- Leptogenys laeviceps (Smith, 1857)
- Leptogenys laeviterga Zhou et al., 2012
- Leptogenys langi Wheeler, 1923
- Leptogenys laozii Xu, 2000
- Leptogenys lattkei Bharti & Wachkoo, 2013
- Leptogenys lavavava Rakotonirina & Fisher, 2014
- Leptogenys leiothorax Prins, 1965
- Leptogenys leleji Zryanin, 2016
- Leptogenys letilae Mann, 1921
- Leptogenys linda Lattke, 2011
- Leptogenys linearis (Smith, 1858)
- Leptogenys loarelae Ramage, 2019
- Leptogenys lohahela Rakotonirina & Fisher, 2014
- Leptogenys longensis Forel, 1915
- Leptogenys longiceps Santschi, 1914
- Leptogenys longiscapus Donisthorpe, 1943
- Leptogenys lucida Rakotonirina & Fisher, 2014
- Leptogenys lucidula Emery, 1895
- Leptogenys luederwaldti Forel, 1913
- Leptogenys mactans Bolton, 1975
- Leptogenys magna Forel, 1900
- Leptogenys malama Rakotonirina & Fisher, 2014
- Leptogenys malayana Arimoto, 2017
- Leptogenys mangabe Rakotonirina & Fisher, 2014
- Leptogenys manja Rakotonirina & Fisher, 2014
- Leptogenys manni Wheeler, 1923
- Leptogenys manongarivo Rakotonirina & Fisher, 2014
- Leptogenys mastax Bolton, 1975
- Leptogenys mavaca Lattke, 2011
- Leptogenys maxillosa (Smith, 1858)
- Leptogenys maya Lattke, 2011
- Leptogenys mayotte Rakotonirina & Fisher, 2014
- Leptogenys melena Lattke, 2011
- Leptogenys mengzii Xu, 2000
- Leptogenys meritans (Walker, 1859)
- Leptogenys microps Bolton, 1975
- Leptogenys minima Lattke, 2011
- Leptogenys mjobergi Forel, 1915
- Leptogenys modiglianii Emery, 1900
- Leptogenys moelleri (Bingham, 1903)
- Leptogenys montuosa Lattke, 2011
- Leptogenys mucronata Forel, 1893
- Leptogenys mutabilis (Smith, 1861)
- Leptogenys myops (Emery, 1887)
- Leptogenys namana Rakotonirina & Fisher, 2014
- Leptogenys namoroka Rakotonirina & Fisher, 2014
- Leptogenys navua Mann, 1921
- Leptogenys nebra Bolton, 1975
- Leptogenys neutralis Forel, 1907
- Leptogenys nigricans Lattke, 2011
- Leptogenys nitens Donisthorpe, 1943
- Leptogenys nuserra Bolton, 1975
- Leptogenys oaxaca Lattke, 2011
- Leptogenys occidentalis Bernard, 1953
- Leptogenys optica Viehmeyer, 1914
- Leptogenys orchidioides Lattke, 2011
- Leptogenys oresbia Wilson, 1958
- Leptogenys oswaldi (Forel, 1891)
- Leptogenys pangui Xu, 2000
- Leptogenys panops Lattke, 2011
- Leptogenys papuana Emery, 1897
- Leptogenys paraensis Lattke, 2011
- Leptogenys parvula Emery, 1900
- Leptogenys pavesii Emery, 1892
- Leptogenys peninsularis Mann, 1926
- Leptogenys peringueyi Forel, 1913
- Leptogenys peruana Lattke, 2011
- Leptogenys peuqueti (Andre, 1887)
- Leptogenys phylloba Lattke, 2011
- Leptogenys pilaka Rakotonirina & Fisher, 2014
- Leptogenys pinna Lattke, 2011
- Leptogenys piroskae Forel, 1910
- Leptogenys pittieri Lattke, 2011
- Leptogenys podenzanai (Emery, 1895)
- Leptogenys polaszeki Sharaf & Akbar, 2017
- Leptogenys pompiloides (Smith, 1857)
- Leptogenys princeps Bolton, 1975
- Leptogenys processionalis (Jerdon, 1851)
- Leptogenys pruinosa Forel, 1900
- Leptogenys pubiceps Emery, 1890
- Leptogenys pucuna Lattke, 2011
- Leptogenys pujoli Cavalcanti & Lattke, 2024
- Leptogenys punctata Emery, 1914
- Leptogenys punctaticeps Emery, 1890
- Leptogenys punctiventris (Mayr, 1879)
- Leptogenys purpurea (Emery, 1887)
- Leptogenys pusilla (Emery, 1890)
- Leptogenys qini Chen et al., 2026
- Leptogenys quadrata Lattke, 2011
- Leptogenys quiriguana Wheeler, 1923
- Leptogenys quirozi Lattke, 2011
- Leptogenys rabebe Rakotonirina & Fisher, 2014
- Leptogenys rabesoni Rakotonirina & Fisher, 2014
- Leptogenys ralipra Rakotonirina & Fisher, 2014
- Leptogenys rasila Lattke, 2011
- Leptogenys ravida Bolton, 1975
- Leptogenys reggae Lattke, 2011
- Leptogenys regis Bolton, 1975
- Leptogenys ridens Forel, 1910
- Leptogenys ritae Forel, 1899
- Leptogenys roberti Forel, 1900
- Leptogenys rouxi (Emery, 1914)
- Leptogenys rufa Mann, 1922
- Leptogenys rufida Zhou et al., 2012
- Leptogenys rugosopunctata Karavaiev, 1925
- Leptogenys sagaris Wilson, 1958
- Leptogenys sahamalaza Rakotonirina & Fisher, 2014
- Leptogenys santacruzi Lattke, 2011
- Leptogenys saussurei (Forel, 1891)
- Leptogenys scabra Chen et al., 2026
- Leptogenys schwabi Forel, 1913
- Leptogenys serrata Lattke, 2011
- Leptogenys sianka Lattke, 2011
- Leptogenys sjostedti Forel, 1915
- Leptogenys socorda Lattke, 2011
- Leptogenys sonora Lattke, 2011
- Leptogenys spandax Bolton, 1975
- Leptogenys stenocheilos (Jerdon, 1851)
- Leptogenys sterops Bolton, 1975
- Leptogenys strator Bolton, 1975
- Leptogenys strena Zhou, 2001
- Leptogenys striatidens Bolton, 1975
- Leptogenys stuhlmanni Mayr, 1893
- Leptogenys stygia Bolton, 1975
- Leptogenys suarensis Emery, 1895
- Leptogenys sulcinoda (Andre, 1892)
- Leptogenys sunyatseni Chen et al., 2026
- Leptogenys sunzii Xu & He, 2015
- Leptogenys tama Lattke, 2011
- Leptogenys tatsimo Rakotonirina & Fisher, 2014
- Leptogenys terroni Bolton, 1975
- Leptogenys testacea (Donisthorpe, 1948)
- Leptogenys tiobil Lattke, 2011
- Leptogenys titan Bolton, 1975
- Leptogenys toeraniva Rakotonirina & Fisher, 2014
- Leptogenys toxeres Lattke, 2011
- Leptogenys transitionis Bharti & Wachkoo, 2013
- Leptogenys tricosa Taylor, 1969
- Leptogenys triloba Emery, 1901
- Leptogenys trilobata Santschi, 1924
- Leptogenys truncata Mann, 1919
- Leptogenys truncatirostris Forel, 1897
- Leptogenys tsingy Rakotonirina & Fisher, 2014
- Leptogenys turneri Forel, 1900
- Leptogenys unistimulosa Roger, 1863
- Leptogenys variabilis Rakotonirina & Fisher, 2014
- Leptogenys varicosa Stitz, 1925
- Leptogenys vatovavy Rakotonirina & Fisher, 2014
- Leptogenys vindicis Bolton, 1975
- Leptogenys violacea Donisthorpe, 1942
- Leptogenys vitiensis Mann, 1921
- Leptogenys vitsy Rakotonirina & Fisher, 2014
- Leptogenys voeltzkowi Forel, 1897
- Leptogenys vogeli Borgmeier, 1933
- Leptogenys volcanica Lattke, 2011
- Leptogenys wheeleri Forel, 1901
- Leptogenys yandii Xu & He, 2015
- Leptogenys yerburyi Forel, 1900
- Leptogenys yocota Lattke, 2011
- Leptogenys zapyxis Bolton, 1975
- Leptogenys zhoui Chen et al., 2024
- Leptogenys zhuangzii Xu, 2000
- Leptogenys zohy Rakotonirina & Fisher, 2014

=== Extinct species ===
- †Leptogenys lacerata Zhang, 1989
