= Edwardsya =

Scientific classification
- Kingdom: Animalia
- Phylum: Arthropoda
- Subphylum: Chelicerata
- Class: Arachnida
- Order: Araneae
- Infraorder: Araneomorphae
- Family: Salticidae
- Subfamily: Salticinae
- Genus: Edwardsya; Bustamante

Type species
- Edwardsya simoni

Species
- Edwardsya igapo Ruiz & Bustamante, 2016; Edwardsya simoni (Taczanowski, 1871)

Genus of spiders

Edwardsya is a genus of spiders in the family Salticidae. It was first described in 2016 by Ruiz & Bustamante. As of 2017, it contains 2 species, both from Brazil. The genus is placed in subtribe Freyina, part of the Salticoida clade in the subfamily Salticinae.
