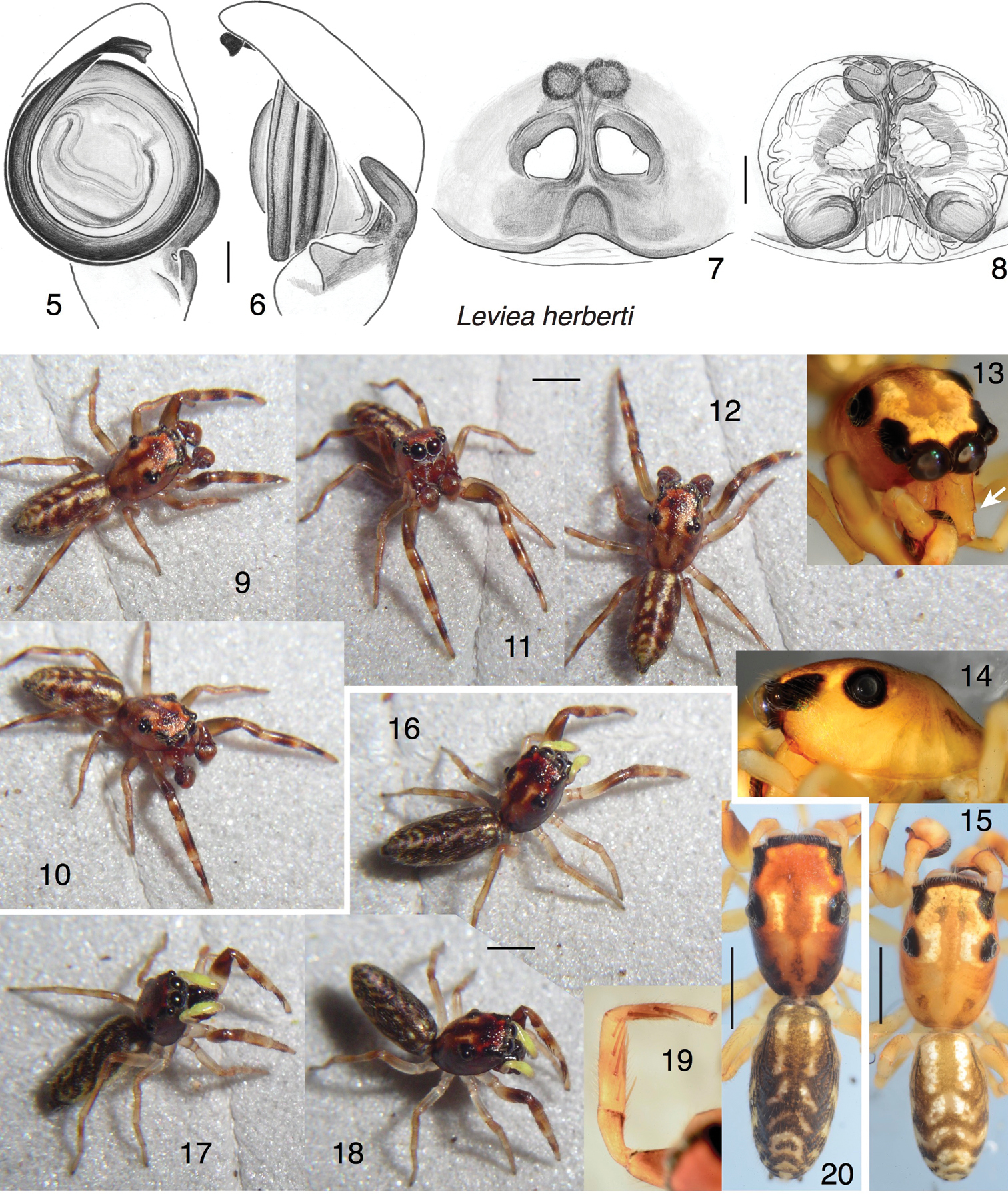
- Leviea herberti

Scientific classification
- Kingdom: Animalia
- Phylum: Arthropoda
- Subphylum: Chelicerata
- Class: Arachnida
- Order: Araneae
- Infraorder: Araneomorphae
- Family: Salticidae
- Subfamily: Salticinae
- Genus: Leviea; Maddison & Szűts, 2019

Type species
- L. herberti Maddison & Szűts, 2019

Species
- Leviea francesae Maddison & Szűts, 2019; Leviea herberti Maddison & Szűts, 2019; Leviea lornae Maddison & Szűts, 2019

= Leviea =

Genus of jumping spiders

Leviea (/lɛviːɛæ/) is a genus of Melanesian jumping spiders. It was first described by Wayne Maddison and T. Szűts in 2019, and As of March 2022 it contains only three species: L. francesae, L. herberti, and L. lornae. The genus name and species epithets honor arachnologists Herbert Walter Levi and his wife Lorna Rose Levi as well as their daughter Frances Levi.

It was erected in 2019 for three newly described species from Papua New Guinea, and was placed in the tribe Myrmarachnini within the Salticoida clade of Salticinae. However, they aren't as ant-like as most other species in the tribe.

== See also ==
- List of Salticidae genera
