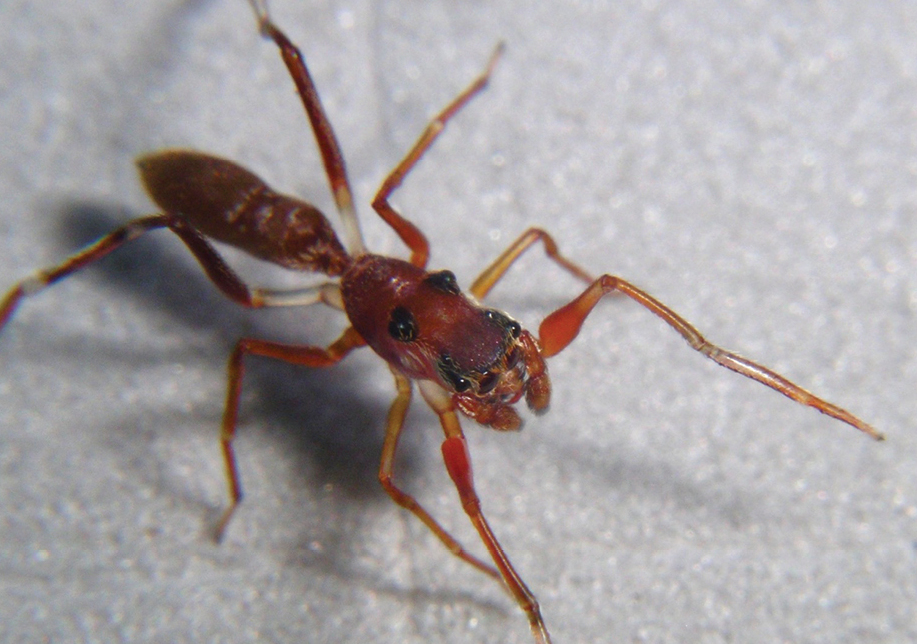
- Agorioides papagena

Scientific classification
- Kingdom: Animalia
- Phylum: Arthropoda
- Subphylum: Chelicerata
- Class: Arachnida
- Order: Araneae
- Infraorder: Araneomorphae
- Family: Salticidae
- Subfamily: Salticinae
- Genus: Agorioides; Maddison & Szűts, 2019

Type species
- A. cherubino Maddison & Szűts, 2019

Species
- Agorioides cherubino Maddison & Szűts, 2019; Agorioides papagena Maddison & Szűts, 2019

= Agorioides =

Genus of jumping spiders

Agorioides is a small genus of Melanesian jumping spiders. It was first described by Wayne Maddison and T. Szűts in 2019, and it has only been found in Papua New Guinea. It is placed in the tribe Myrmarachnini, part of the Salticoida clade of the subfamily Salticinae in Wayne Maddison's 2015 classification of the jumping spiders. As of March 2022 it contains only two species: A. cherubino and A. papagena.

== See also ==
- List of Salticidae genera
