= Bavirecta =

Scientific classification
- Kingdom: Animalia
- Phylum: Arthropoda
- Subphylum: Chelicerata
- Class: Arachnida
- Order: Araneae
- Infraorder: Araneomorphae
- Family: Salticidae
- Subfamily: Salticinae
- Genus: Bavirecta; Kanesharatnam & Benjamin, 2018

Type species
- B. flavopuncta Kanesharatnam & Benjamin, 2018

Species
- See text.

Genus of spiders

Bavirecta is a genus of Asian jumping spiders first described by N. Kanesharatnam & Suresh P. Benjamin in 2018. As of April 2019 it contains only two species. It was placed in the tribe Baviini, part of the clade Salticoida of the subfamily Salticinae.

== Species ==
As of August 2020, the World Spider Catalog recognizes two species:

- Bavirecta exilis (Cao & Li, 2016) — China
- Bavirecta flavopuncta Kanesharatnam & Benjamin, 2018 — Sri Lanka
