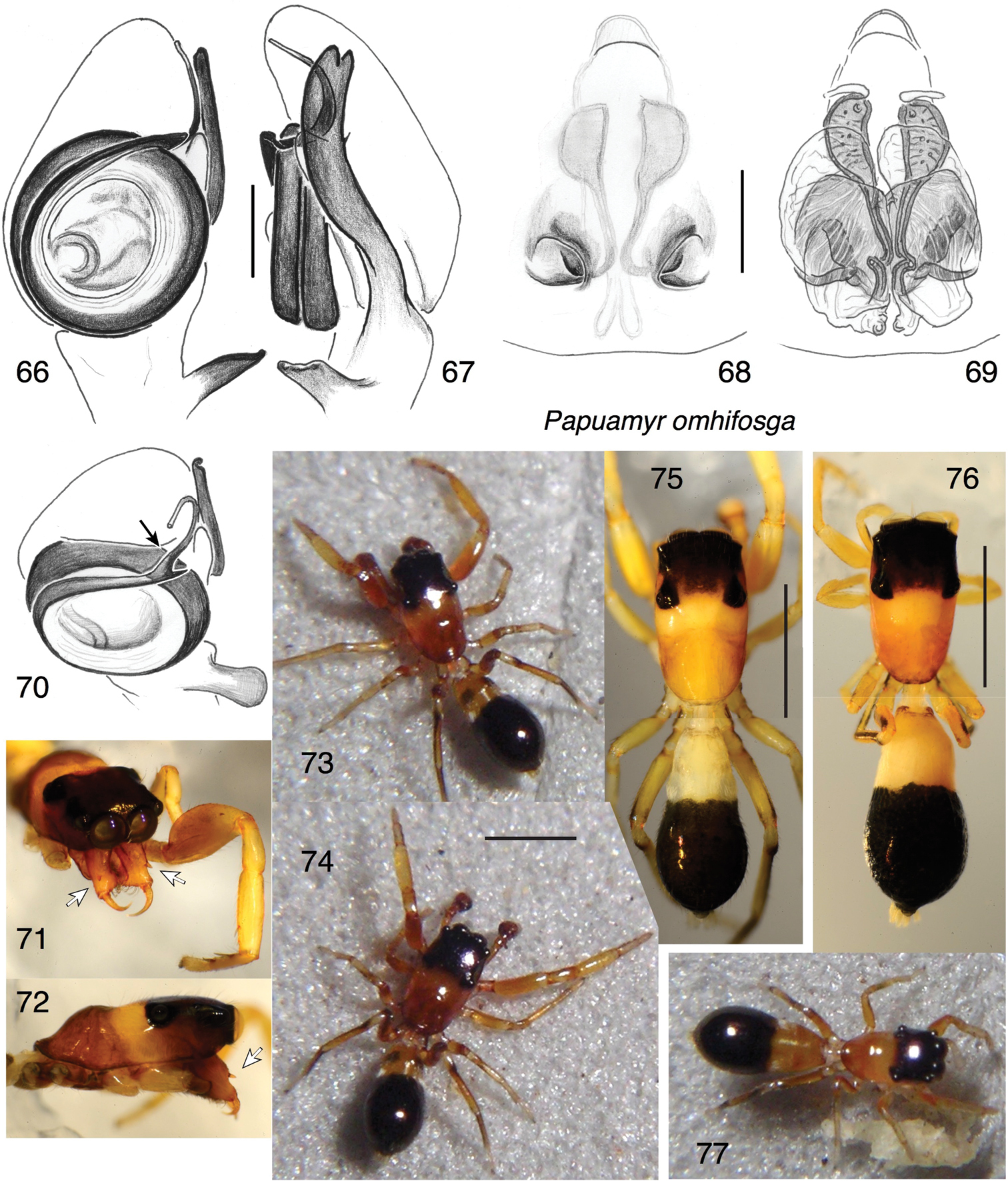
- A diagram of the species Papuamyr Omhifosga.

Scientific classification
- Kingdom: Animalia
- Phylum: Arthropoda
- Subphylum: Chelicerata
- Class: Arachnida
- Order: Araneae
- Infraorder: Araneomorphae
- Family: Salticidae
- Subfamily: Salticinae
- Genus: Papuamyr; Maddison & Szűts, 2019

Type species
- P. omhifosga Maddison & Szűts, 2019

Species
- Papuamyr omhifosga Maddison & Szűts, 2019; Papuamyr pandora Maddison & Szűts, 2019

= Papuamyr =

Genus of jumping spiders

Papuamyr is a small genus of Melanesian jumping spiders native to Papua New Guinea. The genus was erected by Wayne Maddison and T. Szűts in 2019, and was placed into the tribe Myrmarachnini, within the Salticoida clade of Salticinae. As of April 2022 it contains only two species: P. omhifosga and P. pandora.

== See also ==
- List of Salticidae genera
