= Agorius constrictus =

Scientific classification
- Kingdom: Animalia
- Phylum: Arthropoda
- Subphylum: Chelicerata
- Class: Arachnida
- Order: Araneae
- Infraorder: Araneomorphae
- Family: Salticidae
- Genus: Agorius
- Species: A. constrictus

Binomial name
- Agorius constrictus Simon, 1901

Species of spider

Agorius constrictus, the long-patella ant jumper, is a species of ant mimicking jumping spider belonging to the family Salticidae. This spider is found in southeast Asia in Peninsular Malaysia and Singapore.

== Taxonomy ==
Agorius constrictus was first formally described in 1901 by the naturalist Eugène Simon with its type locality given as Singapore. The genus Agorius is classified within subfamily Salticinae of the family Salticidae, the jumping spiders.

== Description ==
Agorius constrictus has similar-sized males and females, both being about 6 mm (0.24 in) long. The orange-brown cephalothorax is about twice as long as wide, with its posterior edge forming a transverse depression behind the rear eyes. The very long opisthosoma mimics the shape of certain ants, with a small dark oval anterior part, a slender whitish "waist" and a large dark oval posterior part. The long slender legs are lightish orange. Agorius jumping spiders are considered to be ant mimics with constricted abdomens and ant-like behavior, for example they use the first pair of legs to mimic antennae.

== Distribution ==
Agorius constrictus is found in southeast Asia where it occurs in Malacca in southern Peninsular Malaysia and in Singapore.

== Biology ==
Agorius constrictus is little known, Agorius species are Batesian mimic of ants, especially those of the genus Leptogenys, ants which have a powerful sting. Analysyis of related species in Borneo has shown that they are mimics for defence against predators rather than using mimicry so thay they can prey on the ants.
