= Agorius baloghi =

Scientific classification
- Kingdom: Animalia
- Phylum: Arthropoda
- Subphylum: Chelicerata
- Class: Arachnida
- Order: Araneae
- Infraorder: Araneomorphae
- Family: Salticidae
- Genus: Agorius
- Species: A. baloghi

Binomial name
- Agorius baloghi Szüts, 2003

Species of spider

Agorius baloghi is a species of ant-like jumping spiders.

== Name ==
The species is named in honor of Hungarian oribatid mite specialist János Balogh, who collected the specimens.

== Distribution ==
Agorius baloghi occurs in New Guinea and New Britain.
