= Agorius borneensis =

Scientific classification
- Kingdom: Animalia
- Phylum: Arthropoda
- Subphylum: Chelicerata
- Class: Arachnida
- Order: Araneae
- Infraorder: Araneomorphae
- Family: Salticidae
- Genus: Agorius
- Species: A. borneensis

Binomial name
- Agorius borneensis Edmunds & Proszynski, 2001

Species of spider

Agorius borneensis is an ant-like jumping spider.

== Name ==
The species is named after Borneo, the locality where it is endemic.
