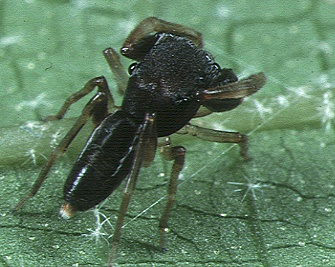
- male S. annae from Okinawa

Scientific classification
- Kingdom: Animalia
- Phylum: Arthropoda
- Subphylum: Chelicerata
- Class: Arachnida
- Order: Araneae
- Infraorder: Araneomorphae
- Family: Salticidae
- Subfamily: Salticinae
- Genus: Synagelides; Strand, 1906

Type species
- S. agoriformis Strand, 1906

Species
- 66, see text

Synonyms
- Tagoria Schenkel, 1963

= Synagelides =

Genus of spiders

Synagelides is a genus of Asian jumping spiders that was first described by W. Bösenberg & Embrik Strand in 1906. This genus and Agorius (and perhaps Pseudosynagelides) are separated as a genus group, sometimes called subfamily Agoriinae, but more recently downranked to tribe Agoriini of the Salticoida clade in subfamily Salticinae.

== Species ==
As of May 2022 it contains sixty-six species, found only in Asia:

- Synagelides agoriformis Strand, 1906 (type) – Russia (Far East), China, Korea, Japan
- Synagelides angustus Li, Wang & Peng, 2021 – China
- Synagelides annae Bohdanowicz, 1979 – China, Japan
- Synagelides bagmaticus Logunov & Hereward, 2006 – Nepal
- Synagelides birmanicus Bohdanowicz, 1987 – Myanmar
- Synagelides bohdanowiczi Wang, Mi, Irfan & Peng, 2020 – China
- Synagelides brahmaputra Caleb, Chatterjee, Tyagi, Kundu & Kumar, 2018 – India
- Synagelides cavaleriei (Schenkel, 1963) – China
- Synagelides darjeelingus Logunov & Hereward, 2006 – India
- Synagelides doisuthep Logunov & Hereward, 2006 – Thailand
- Synagelides emangou Liu, 2022 – China
- Synagelides forkiforma Yang, Zhu & Song, 2007 – China
- Synagelides gambosus Xie & Yin, 1990 – China
- Synagelides gosainkundicus Bohdanowicz, 1987 – Nepal
- Synagelides hamatus Zhu, Zhang, Zhang & Chen, 2005 – China
- Synagelides haoyai Logunov, 2017 – Thailand
- Synagelides hortonensis Kanesharatnam & Benjamin, 2020 – Sri Lanka
- Synagelides huangsangensis Peng, Yin, Yan & Kim, 1998 – China
- Synagelides hubeiensis Peng & Li, 2008 – China
- Synagelides jinding Liu, 2022 – China
- Synagelides jinggangshanensis Liu, Chen, Xu & Peng, 2017 – China
- Synagelides jingzhao Yang, Zhu & Song, 2007 – China
- Synagelides kochang Logunov, 2017 – Thailand
- Synagelides kosi Logunov & Hereward, 2006 – Nepal
- Synagelides kualaensis Logunov & Hereward, 2006 – Malaysia
- Synagelides lakmalii Kanesharatnam & Benjamin, 2020 – Sri Lanka
- Synagelides larisae Logunov, 2017 – Indonesia (Sumatra)
- Synagelides latus Li, Wang & Peng, 2021 – China
- Synagelides lehtineni Logunov & Hereward, 2006 – India
- Synagelides leigongensis Wang, Mi, Irfan & Peng, 2020 – China
- Synagelides logunovi Wang, Mi, Irfan & Peng, 2020 – China
- Synagelides longus Song & Chai, 1992 – China
- Synagelides lushanensis Xie & Yin, 1990 – China
- Synagelides martensi Bohdanowicz, 1987 – India, Nepal
- Synagelides munnar Logunov, 2017 – India
- Synagelides nepalensis Bohdanowicz, 1987 – Nepal
- Synagelides nishikawai Bohdanowicz, 1979 – Nepal
- Synagelides oleksiaki Bohdanowicz, 1987 – Nepal
- Synagelides orlandoi Kanesharatnam & Benjamin, 2020 – Sri Lanka
- Synagelides palpalis Zabka, 1985 – China, Vietnam
- Synagelides palpaloides Peng, Tso & Li, 2002 – Taiwan
- Synagelides platnicki Lin & Li, 2020 – China
- Synagelides proszynskii Barrion, Barrion-Dupo & Heong, 2013 – China
- Synagelides rosalindae Kanesharatnam & Benjamin, 2020 – China
- Synagelides serratus Liu, 2022 – China
- Synagelides shuqiang Liu, 2022 – China
- Synagelides subagoriformis Li, Wang & Peng, 2021 – China
- Synagelides subgambosus Wang, Mi, Irfan & Peng, 2020 – China
- Synagelides sumatranus Logunov & Hereward, 2006 – Indonesia (Sumatra)
- Synagelides tangi Liu, Chen, Xu & Peng, 2017 – China
- Synagelides tianmu Song, 1990 – China
- Synagelides triangulatus Liu, 2022 – China
- Synagelides triangulus Li, Wang & Peng, 2021 – China
- Synagelides tukchensis Bohdanowicz, 1987 – Nepal
- Synagelides ullerensis Bohdanowicz, 1987 – Nepal
- Synagelides walesai Bohdanowicz, 1987 – Nepal
- Synagelides wangdicus Bohdanowicz, 1978 – Bhutan
- Synagelides wuermlii Bohdanowicz, 1978 – Bhutan
- Synagelides wuliangensis Wang, Mi, Irfan & Peng, 2020 – China
- Synagelides xingdouensis Wang, Mi, Irfan & Peng, 2020 – China
- Synagelides yinae Liu, Chen, Xu & Peng, 2017 – China
- Synagelides yunnan Song & Zhu, 1998 – China
- Synagelides zebrus Peng & Li, 2008 – China
- Synagelides zhaoi Peng, Li & Chen, 2003 – China
- Synagelides zhilcovae Prószyński, 1979 – Russia (Far East), Korea, Japan, China, Taiwan
- Synagelides zonatus Peng & Li, 2008 – China
