= Leptogenys meritans =

Scientific classification
- Kingdom: Animalia
- Phylum: Arthropoda
- Clade: Pancrustacea
- Class: Insecta
- Order: Hymenoptera
- Family: Formicidae
- Genus: Leptogenys
- Species: L. meritans

Binomial name
- Leptogenys meritans (Walker, 1859)

Species of ant

Leptogenys meritans, is a species of ant of the subfamily Ponerinae. It is found in Sri Lanka.
