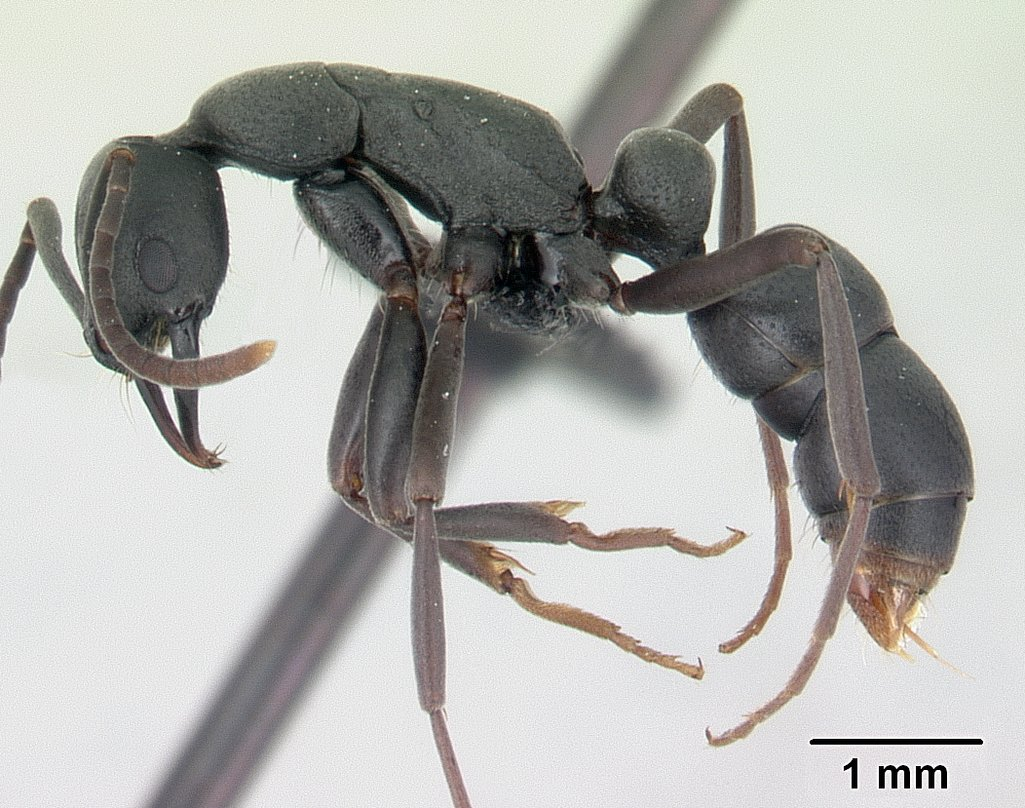

Scientific classification
- Kingdom: Animalia
- Phylum: Arthropoda
- Clade: Pancrustacea
- Class: Insecta
- Order: Hymenoptera
- Family: Formicidae
- Genus: Leptogenys
- Species: L. falcigera

Binomial name
- Leptogenys falcigera Roger, 1861

Synonyms
- Leptogenys insularis Smith, F., 1879

= Leptogenys falcigera =

Species of ant

Leptogenys falcigera, is a species of ant of the subfamily Ponerinae.

== Distribution ==
Comoros, Guam, Hawaii, Marshall Islands, Micronesia, Palau, Philippines, Madagascar, Mauritius, Sri Lanka.
