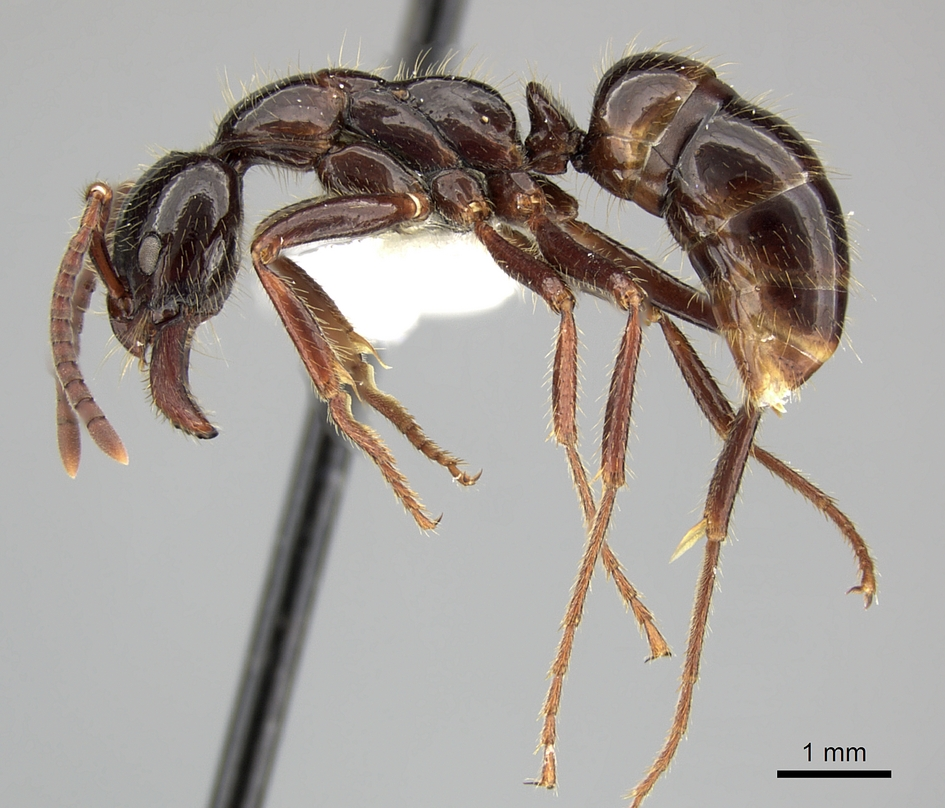

Scientific classification
- Kingdom: Animalia
- Phylum: Arthropoda
- Clade: Pancrustacea
- Class: Insecta
- Order: Hymenoptera
- Family: Formicidae
- Genus: Leptogenys
- Species: L. processionalis

Binomial name
- Leptogenys processionalis (Jerdon, 1851)

Synonyms
- Lobopelta distinguenda andrei Emery, 1887; Ponera ocellifera Roger, 1861

= Leptogenys processionalis =

Species of ant

Leptogenys processionalis, is a species of ant of the subfamily Ponerinae.

== Subspecies ==
- Leptogenys processionalis distinguenda Emery, 1887 - Borneo
- Leptogenys processionalis processionalis Emery, 1887 - India, Sri Lanka, Vietnam
