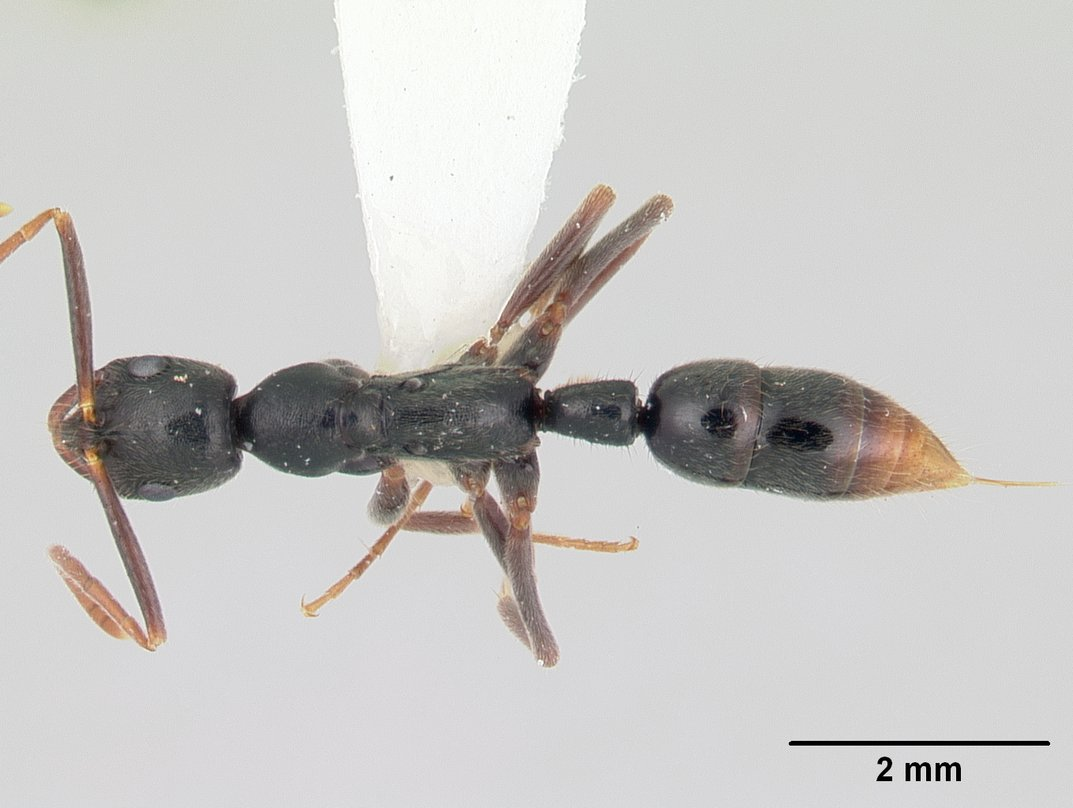

Scientific classification
- Kingdom: Animalia
- Phylum: Arthropoda
- Class: Insecta
- Order: Hymenoptera
- Family: Formicidae
- Tribe: Ponerini
- Genus: Leptogenys
- Species: L. elongata

Binomial name
- Leptogenys elongata (Buckley, 1866)

= Leptogenys elongata =

Species of ant

Leptogenys elongata is a species of ant in the family Formicidae.

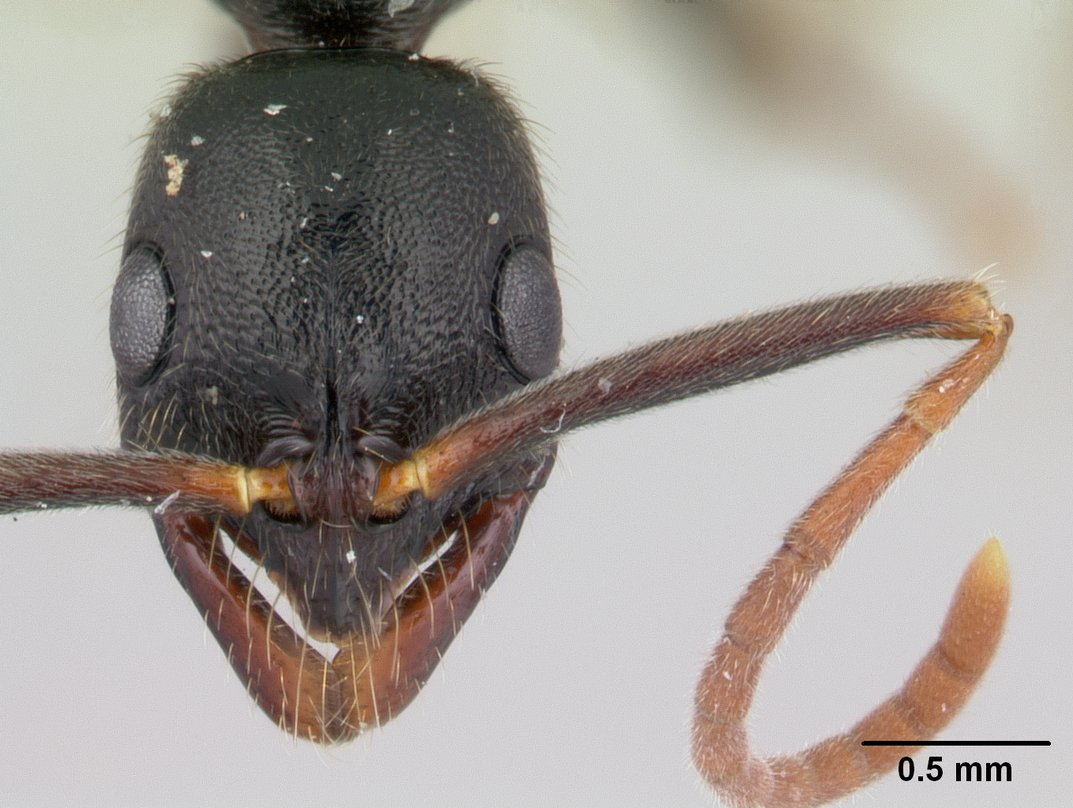

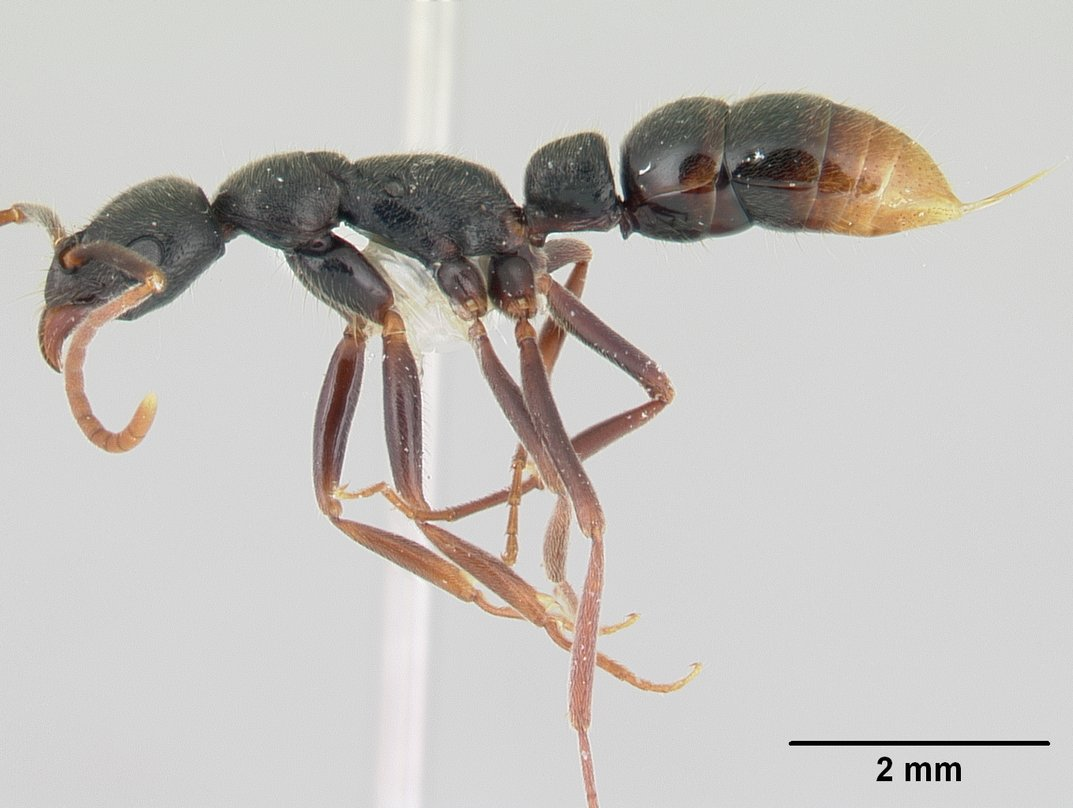
