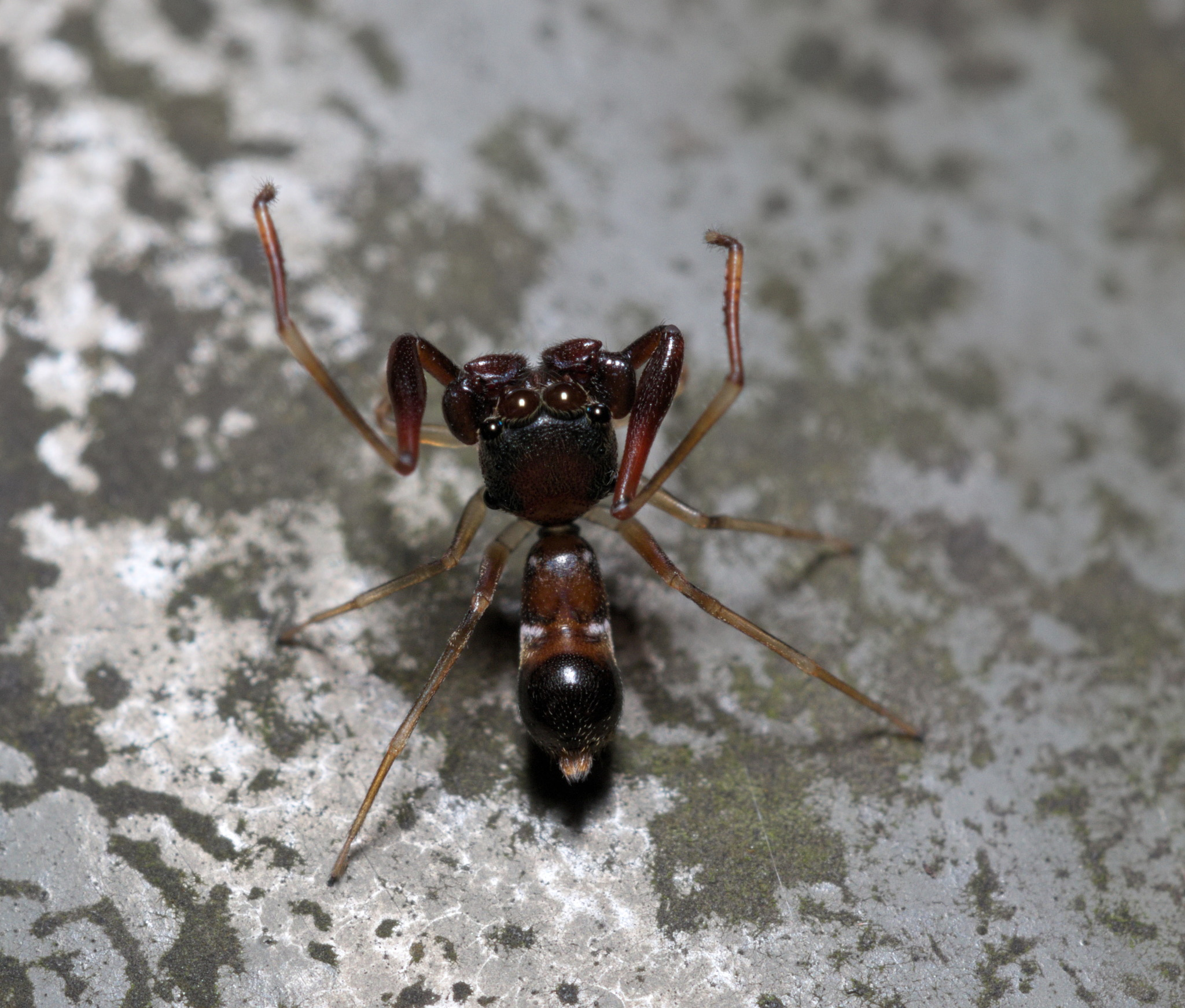
- from Hong Kong

Scientific classification
- Kingdom: Animalia
- Phylum: Arthropoda
- Subphylum: Chelicerata
- Class: Arachnida
- Order: Araneae
- Infraorder: Araneomorphae
- Family: Salticidae
- Genus: Synagelides
- Species: S. cavaleriei

Binomial name
- Synagelides cavaleriei (Schenkel, 1963)

Synonyms
- Tagoria cavaleriei Schenkel, 1963

= Synagelides cavaleriei =

Species of spider

Synagelides cavaleriei is a species of jumping spider in the family Salticidae. It was originally described as Tagoria cavaleriei by Ehrenfried Schenkel-Haas in 1963 from specimens collected in China. The species was later transferred to the genus Synagelides by Bohdanowicz & Hęciak in 1980.

== Taxonomy ==
The species was originally described by Ehrenfried Schenkel-Haas (published in 1963, ten years after his death) as Tagoria cavaleriei based on material from "Anschun fu" (Anshun Prefecture) and "Ganschen fu" (Ganzhou Prefecture?) collected in 1912. In 1980, Bohdanowicz and Hęciak transferred the species to the genus Synagelides and provided a redescription with detailed illustrations. The species has been included in several major works on Chinese spiders, including comprehensive treatments by Song (1987), Song, Zhu & Chen (1999), and most recently Peng (2020).

== Distribution ==
S. cavaleriei is known from China, where it has been recorded from multiple provinces including Tibet Autonomous Region. The species appears to have a relatively wide distribution across China based on collection records spanning several decades.

== Description ==
Synagelides cavaleriei is a small jumping spider. Males measure approximately 3.8 mm in total body length, with the cephalothorax being 1.7 mm long and 1.3 mm wide at its broadest point. Females are slightly smaller at about 3.6 mm total length with a cephalothorax measuring 1.5 mm long and 1.15 mm wide.

The cephalothorax is orange-brown in coloration with a distinctive black border along the front margin that extends to the posterior lateral eyes. The posterior third of the abdomen is glossy brown-black, while the remaining dorsal surface features two large, brownish-yellow triangular markings that connect narrowly in the middle.

Males possess distinctive palpal modifications typical of the genus, with the palpal patella being notably enlarged and barrel-shaped. The tibia bears two apophyses on its outer lower margin - a posterior hook-like process and an anterior elongated sigmoid process.
