= Leptogenys pruinosa =

Scientific classification
- Kingdom: Animalia
- Phylum: Arthropoda
- Clade: Pancrustacea
- Class: Insecta
- Order: Hymenoptera
- Family: Formicidae
- Genus: Leptogenys
- Species: L. pruinosa

Binomial name
- Leptogenys pruinosa Forel, 1900

Species of ant

Leptogenys pruinosa, is a species of ant of the subfamily Ponerinae. It is found in Sri Lanka, and Philippines.
