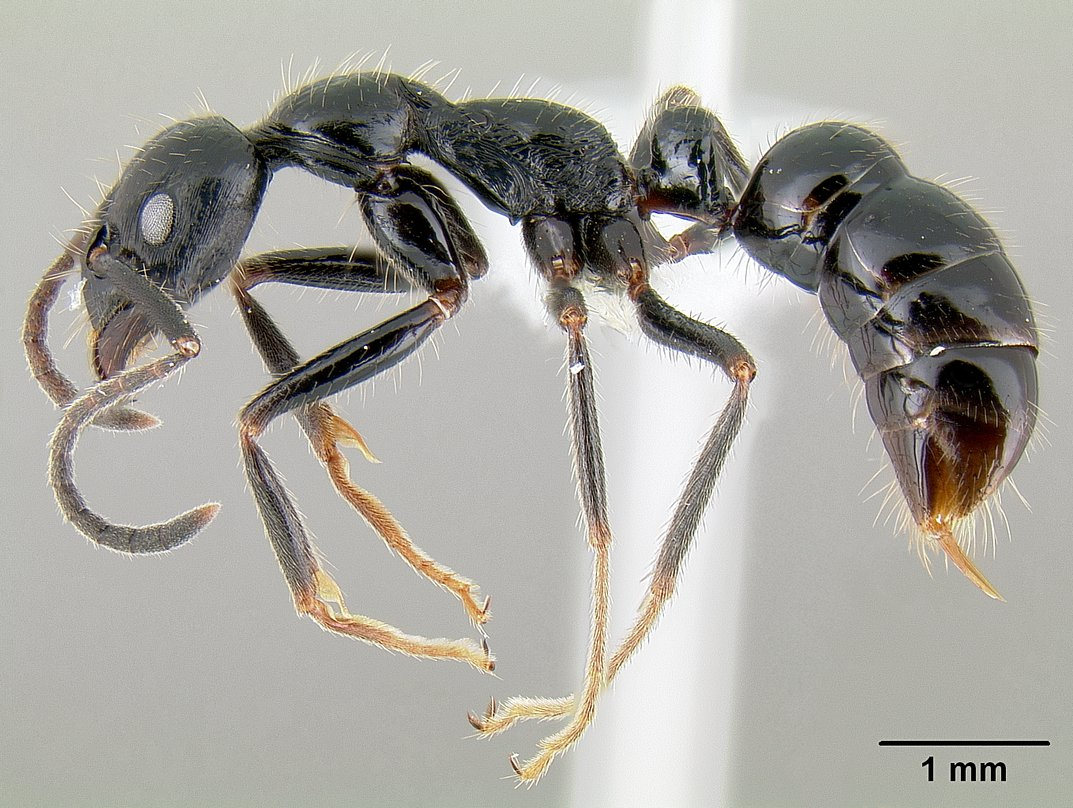

Scientific classification
- Kingdom: Animalia
- Phylum: Arthropoda
- Clade: Pancrustacea
- Class: Insecta
- Order: Hymenoptera
- Family: Formicidae
- Genus: Leptogenys
- Species: L. diminuta

Binomial name
- Leptogenys diminuta (Smith, F., 1857)

Synonyms
- Leptogenys diminuta bismarckensis Forel, 1901; Leptogenys diminuta papuana Stitz, 1912; Leptogenys diminuta santschii Mann, 1919; Leptogenys diminuta stitzi Viehmeyer, 1924; Leptogenys diminuta yarrabahna Forel, 1915; Ponera ferox Smith, F., 1865; Ponera simillima Smith, F. 1860

= Leptogenys diminuta =

Species of ant

Leptogenys diminuta is a species of ant of the subfamily Ponerinae. Twelve subspecies are recognized.

== Subspecies ==
- Leptogenys diminuta deceptrix Forel, 1901 - India
- Leptogenys diminuta diminuta (Smith, F., 1857) - Australia, Borneo, Indonesia, New Guinea, Philippines, Solomon Islands, Bangladesh, India, Myanmar, Sri Lanka, Thailand, Vietnam, China
- Leptogenys diminuta diminutolaeviceps Forel, 1900 - India
- Leptogenys diminuta fruhstorferi Emery, 1896 - Indonesia
- Leptogenys diminuta laeviceps Smith, F., 1857 - Borneo, India
- Leptogenys diminuta nongnongi Karavaiev, 1925 - Indonesia
- Leptogenys diminuta opacinodis Emery, 1887 - Indonesia
- Leptogenys diminuta palliseri Forel, 1900 - India
- Leptogenys diminuta sarasinorum Forel, 1900 - Nepal
- Leptogenys diminuta striatula Emery, 1895 - Myanmar
- Leptogenys diminuta tjibodana Karavaiev, 1926 - Indonesia
- Leptogenys diminuta woodmasoni Forel, 1886 - India
