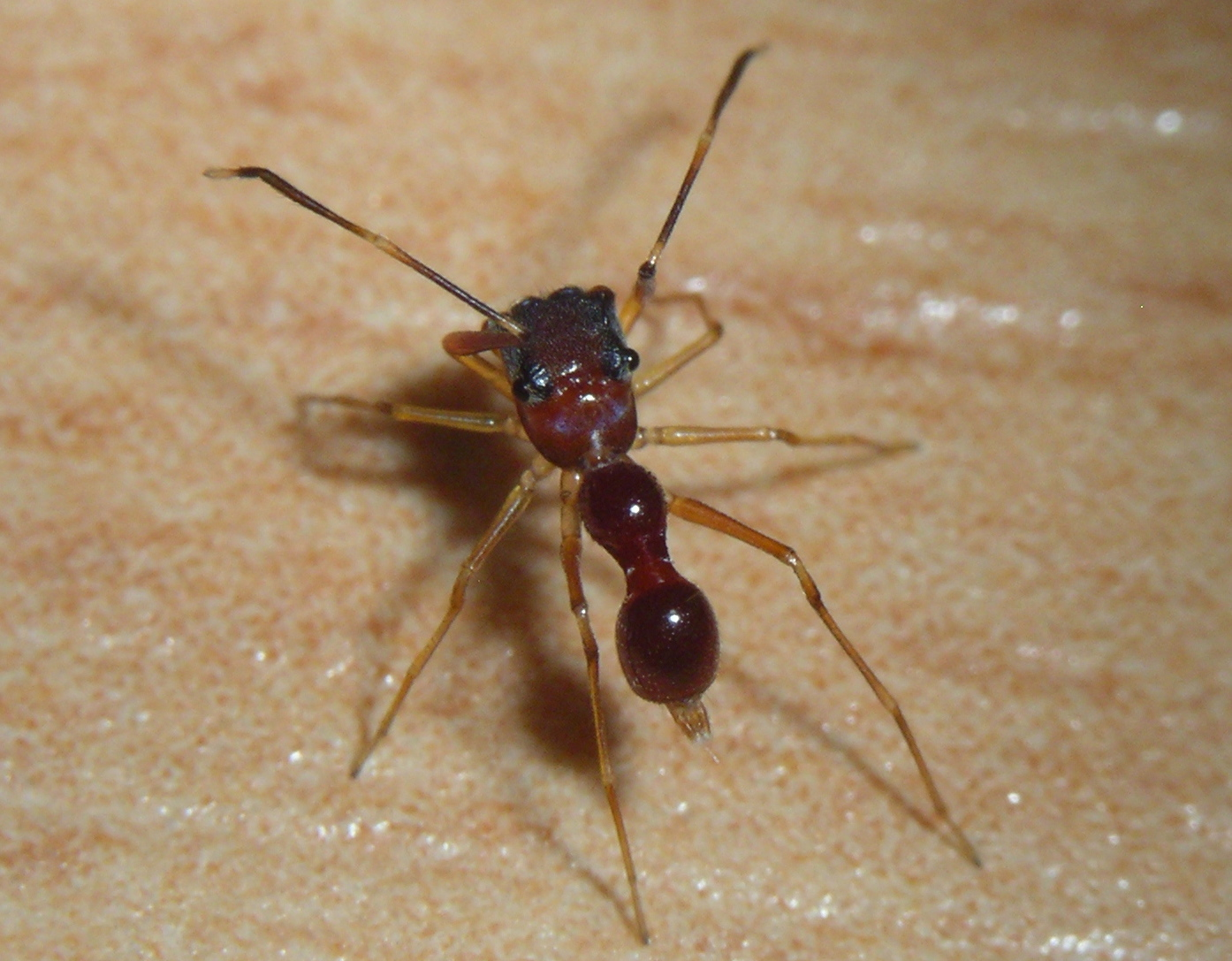
- Male Agorius sp. in Singapore

Scientific classification
- Kingdom: Animalia
- Phylum: Arthropoda
- Subphylum: Chelicerata
- Class: Arachnida
- Order: Araneae
- Infraorder: Araneomorphae
- Family: Salticidae
- Subfamily: Salticinae
- Genus: Agorius; Thorell, 1877

Type species
- Agorius gracilipes Thorell, 1877

Species
- See text

Diversity
- 12 species

= Agorius =

Genus of spiders

Agorius is a genus of spiders in the family Salticidae (jumping spiders). The genera Agorius and Synagelides (and perhaps Pseudosynagelides) are separated as a genus group, sometimes called subfamily Agoriinae but more recently downranked to tribe Agoriini of the Salticoida clade in subfamily Salticinae.

== History ==
Agorius was first described by Tamerlan Thorell in 1877. No new species were described for about one hundred years, with seven new species found in the twenty-first century. Undescribed species have been found in Malaysia and Sabah. Several more species have been found but not yet described.

== Description ==
Both sexes are about six to eight mm long. Agorius is similar to Myrmarachne, another good ant mimic, but can be distinguished from it by having no large, forward-pointing chelicerae, and is not found on vegetation above the ground, but only in rain forest leaf litter.

A. borneensis, A. formicinus, A. saaristoi and A. semirufus are only known from male specimens; A. cinctus, A. gracilipes and A. marieae are only known from a female.

== Species ==
Agorius constrictus

As of April 2017, the World Spider Catalog accepts 12 species in the genus:

- Agorius baloghi Szüts, 2003 – New Guinea, New Britain
- Agorius borneensis Edmunds & Prószyński, 2001 – Borneo
- Agorius cinctus Simon, 1901 – Java, Lombok
- Agorius constrictus Simon, 1901 – Malaysia, Singapore
- Agorius formicinus Simon, 1903 – Sumatra
- Agorius gracilipes Thorell, 1877 – Sulawesi
- Agorius kerinci Prószyński, 2009 – Sumatra
- Agorius lindu Prószyński, 2009 – Sulawesi
- Agorius marieae Freudenschuss & Seiter, 2016 – Philippines
- Agorius saaristoi Prószyński, 2009 – Borneo
- Agorius semirufus Simon, 1901 – Philippines
- Agorius tortilis Cao & Li, 2016 – China
