= Leptogenys hysterica =

Scientific classification
- Kingdom: Animalia
- Phylum: Arthropoda
- Clade: Pancrustacea
- Class: Insecta
- Order: Hymenoptera
- Family: Formicidae
- Genus: Leptogenys
- Species: L. hysterica

Binomial name
- Leptogenys hysterica Forel, 1900

Species of ant

Leptogenys hysterica, is a species of ant of the subfamily Ponerinae. It is found in Borneo, India, Sri Lanka, and Thailand.
