= Pseudosynagelides =

Scientific classification
- Kingdom: Animalia
- Phylum: Arthropoda
- Subphylum: Chelicerata
- Class: Arachnida
- Order: Araneae
- Infraorder: Araneomorphae
- Family: Salticidae
- Subfamily: Salticinae
- Genus: Pseudosynagelides; Zabka, 1991

Type species
- Pseudosynagelides yorkensis Zabka, 1991

Species
- See text.

Diversity
- 6 species

Genus of spiders

Pseudosynagelides is a spider genus of the jumping spider family, Salticidae.

The genera Agorius and Synagelides (and perhaps Pseudosynagelides) are separated as a genus group, sometimes called subfamily Agoriinae but more recently downranked to tribe Agoriini of the Salticoida clade in subfamily Salticinae.

== Name ==
The genus name is combined of Greek pseudo "false" and the salticid genus name Synagelides.

== Species ==
- Pseudosynagelides australensis Zabka, 1991 – Queensland
- Pseudosynagelides bunya Zabka, 1991 – Queensland
- Pseudosynagelides elae Zabka, 1991 – Queensland
- Pseudosynagelides monteithi Zabka, 1991 – Queensland
- Pseudosynagelides raveni Zabka, 1991 – Queensland, New South Wales
- Pseudosynagelides yorkensis Zabka, 1991 – Queensland
