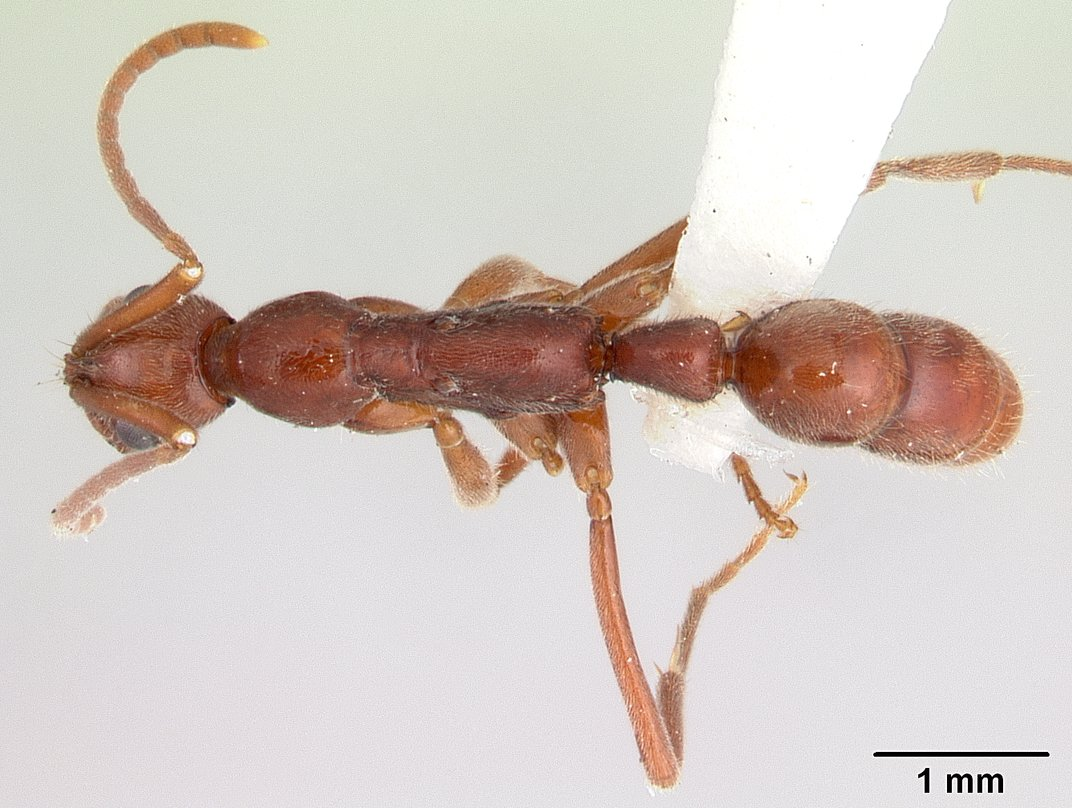

Scientific classification
- Kingdom: Animalia
- Phylum: Arthropoda
- Class: Insecta
- Order: Hymenoptera
- Family: Formicidae
- Tribe: Ponerini
- Genus: Leptogenys
- Species: L. manni

Binomial name
- Leptogenys manni Wheeler, 1923

= Leptogenys manni =

Species of ant

Leptogenys manni is a species of ant in the family Formicidae.

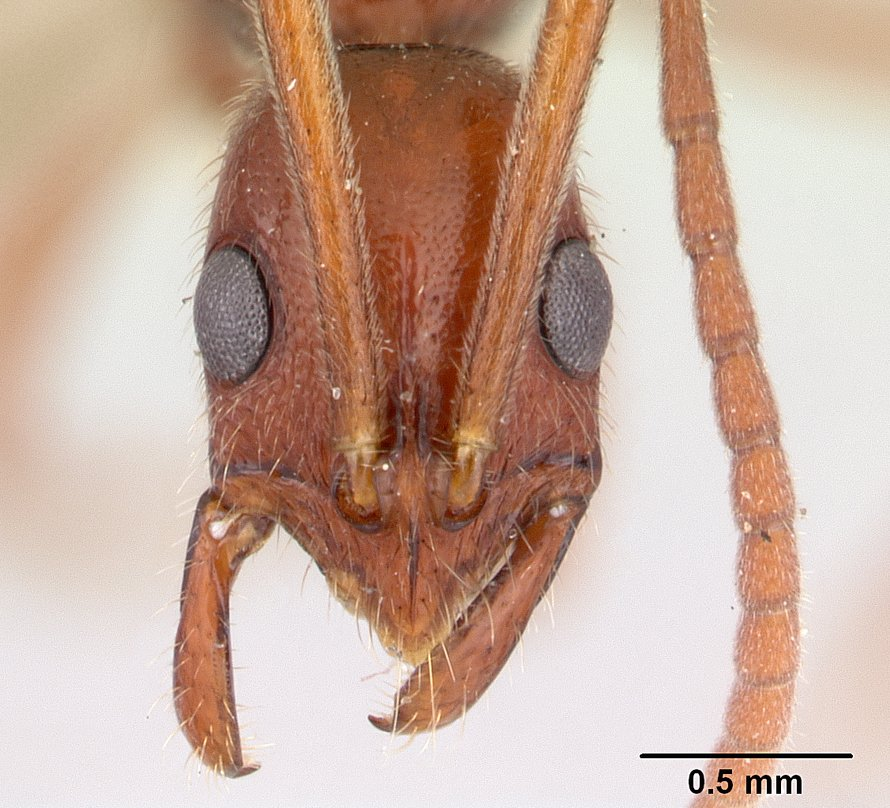

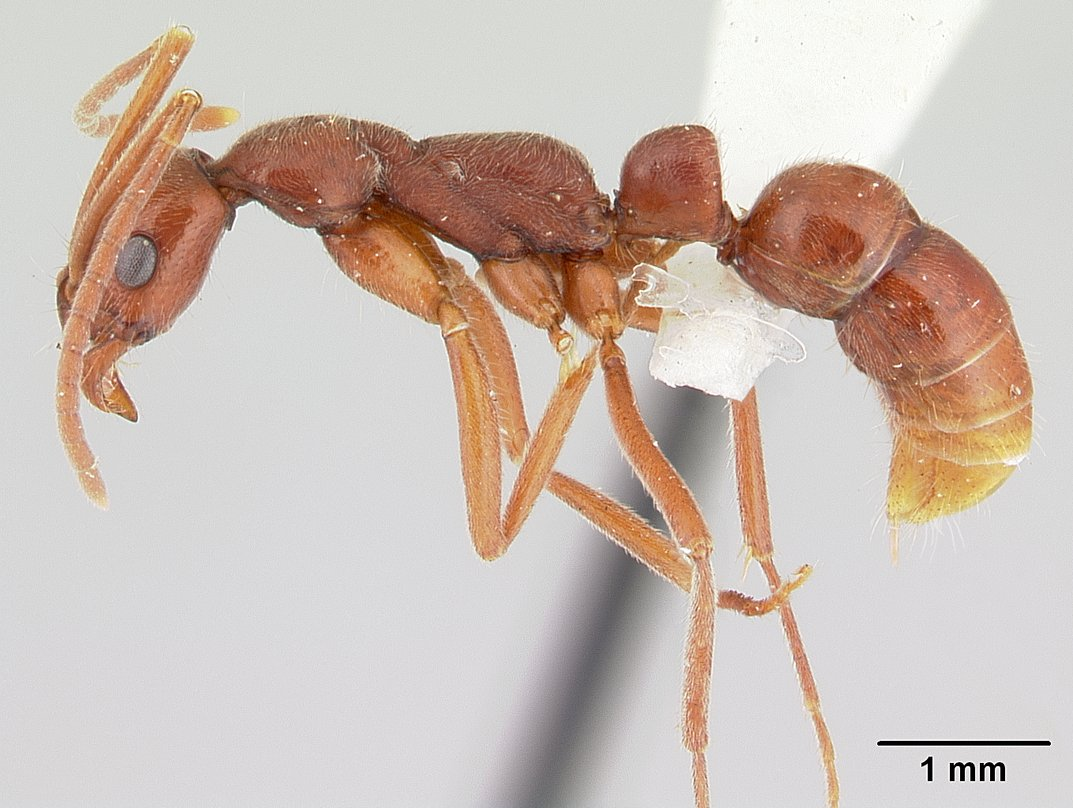
