= Synagelides palpaloides =

Scientific classification
- Kingdom: Animalia
- Phylum: Arthropoda
- Subphylum: Chelicerata
- Class: Arachnida
- Order: Araneae
- Infraorder: Araneomorphae
- Family: Salticidae
- Genus: Synagelides
- Species: S. palpaloides

Binomial name
- Synagelides palpaloides Peng, Tso & Li, 2002

Species of spider

Synagelides palpaloides is a jumping spider native to Taiwan. Adults males can grow to be 2.5 millimetres (0.098 in) to 4 millimetres (0.16 in) long. The carapace is mostly brown and covered with small granules, but the base of each eye, the edge of the carapace, and part of the area around the eyes is black. There are few hairs and these can be either brown or white. It most resembles Synagelides penicilatus except that the epigyne is clear, the spermathecae are longer, thinner, and arc-shaped, the copulatory canal is shorter, and the abdominal pattern is different.
