= János Balogh (biologist) =

Hungarian zoologist, ecologist and professor

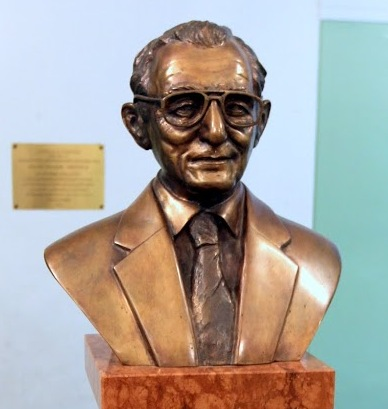
Bust of János Balogh in Fasori Gimnázium, Budapest

János Balogh (19 February 1913, Lonka, Austro-Hungarian Empire – 15 August 2002, Budapest) was a Hungarian zoologist, ecologist, and professor, a recipient of the Kossuth and Széchenyi Prizes, and member of the Hungarian Academy of Sciences.

He specialized in arachnology, and made major contributions to the knowledge of spiders and oribatid mites, as well as zoocenology, the study of animal communities.
