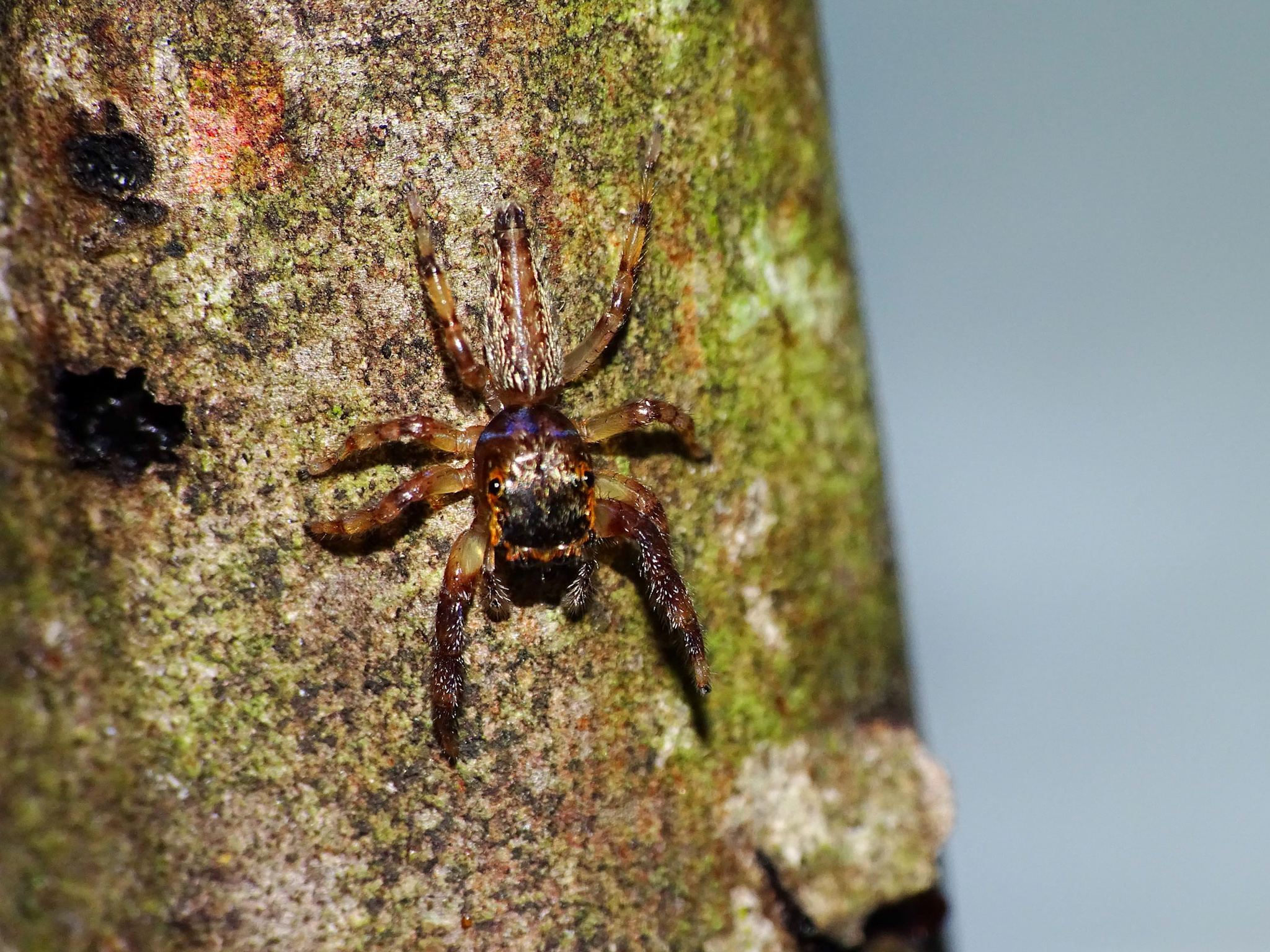
- Piranthus sp.

Scientific classification
- Kingdom: Animalia
- Phylum: Arthropoda
- Subphylum: Chelicerata
- Class: Arachnida
- Order: Araneae
- Infraorder: Araneomorphae
- Family: Salticidae
- Subfamily: Salticinae
- Genus: Piranthus; Thorell, 1895

Type species
- Piranthus decorus Thorell, 1895

Species
- Piranthus casteti Simon, 1900 – India; Piranthus decorus Thorell, 1895 – Burma; see text

Diversity
- 2 species

= Piranthus =

Genus of spiders

Piranthus is a genus of jumping spiders first described in 1895 by Tamerlan Thorell, who derived the name from Greek mythology. As of February 2019 this genus contains only two species.

The first male was described in June 2020. These spiders are mostly black with some white pubescence on the sides of the cephalothorax. The longish abdomen has a dark median stripe in the middle of a wide light median band. The legs are reddish-brown with black rings and very short, with the first pair much more robust than the others. The palps of females are yellowish white and the female P. decorus is about 9 millimetres (1/3 in) long. Eugène Simon compared this genus with Padilla.
