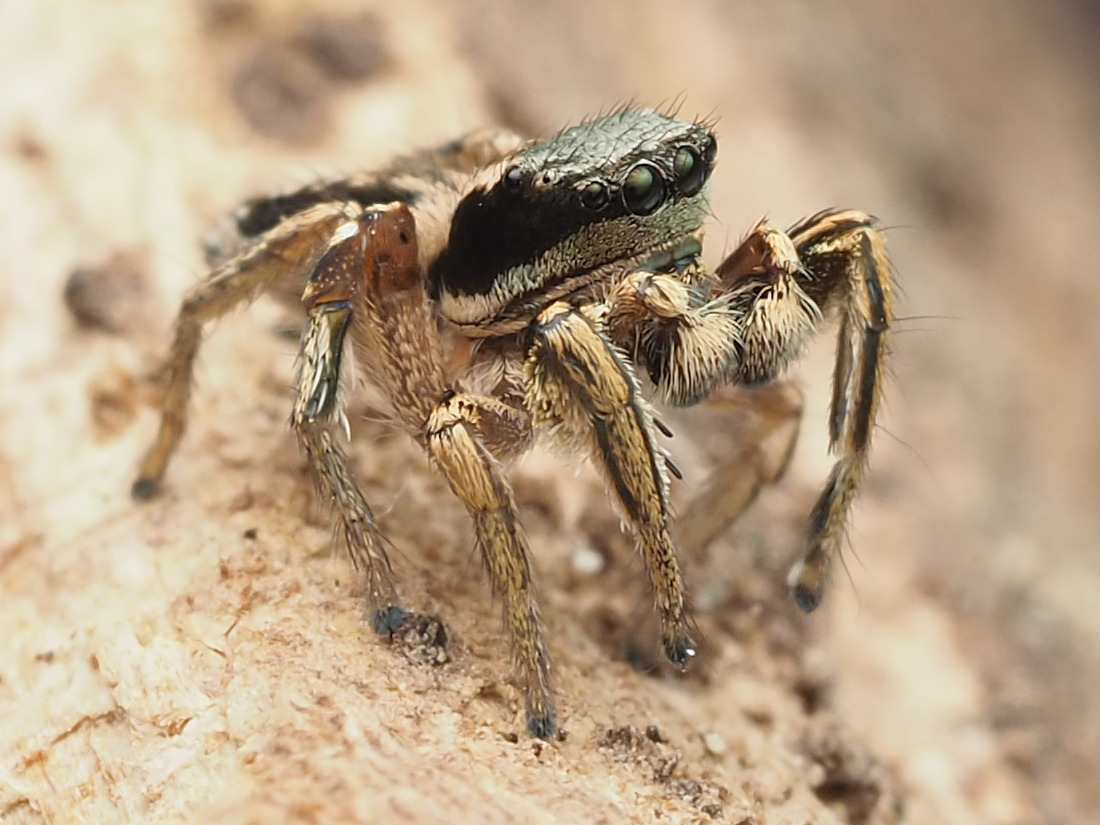
- Male in Belize
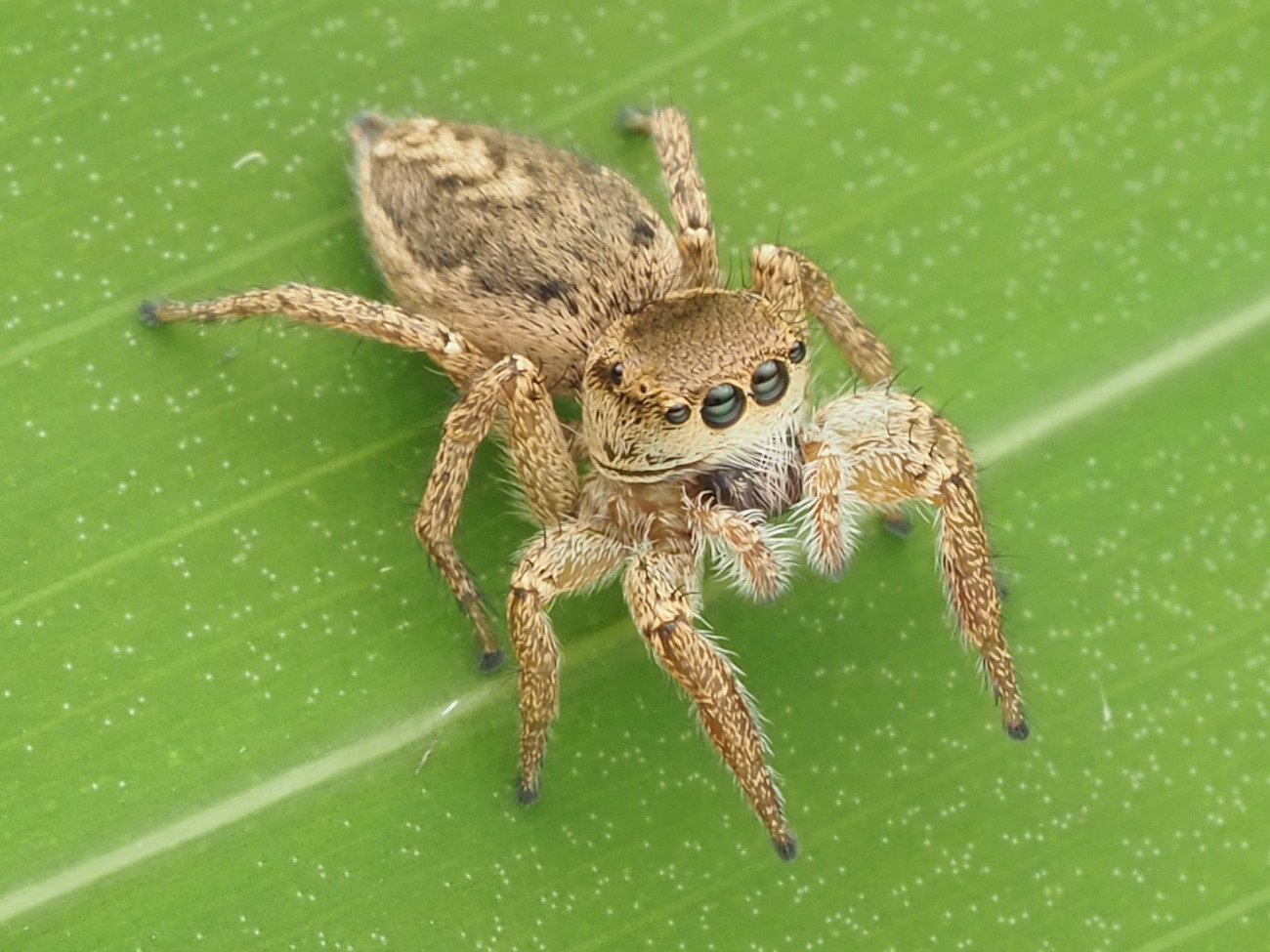
- Female in Belize

Scientific classification
- Kingdom: Animalia
- Phylum: Arthropoda
- Subphylum: Chelicerata
- Class: Arachnida
- Order: Araneae
- Infraorder: Araneomorphae
- Family: Salticidae
- Genus: Habronattus
- Species: H. mexicanus

Binomial name
- Habronattus mexicanus (Peckham & Peckham, 1896)

= Habronattus mexicanus =

Species of spider

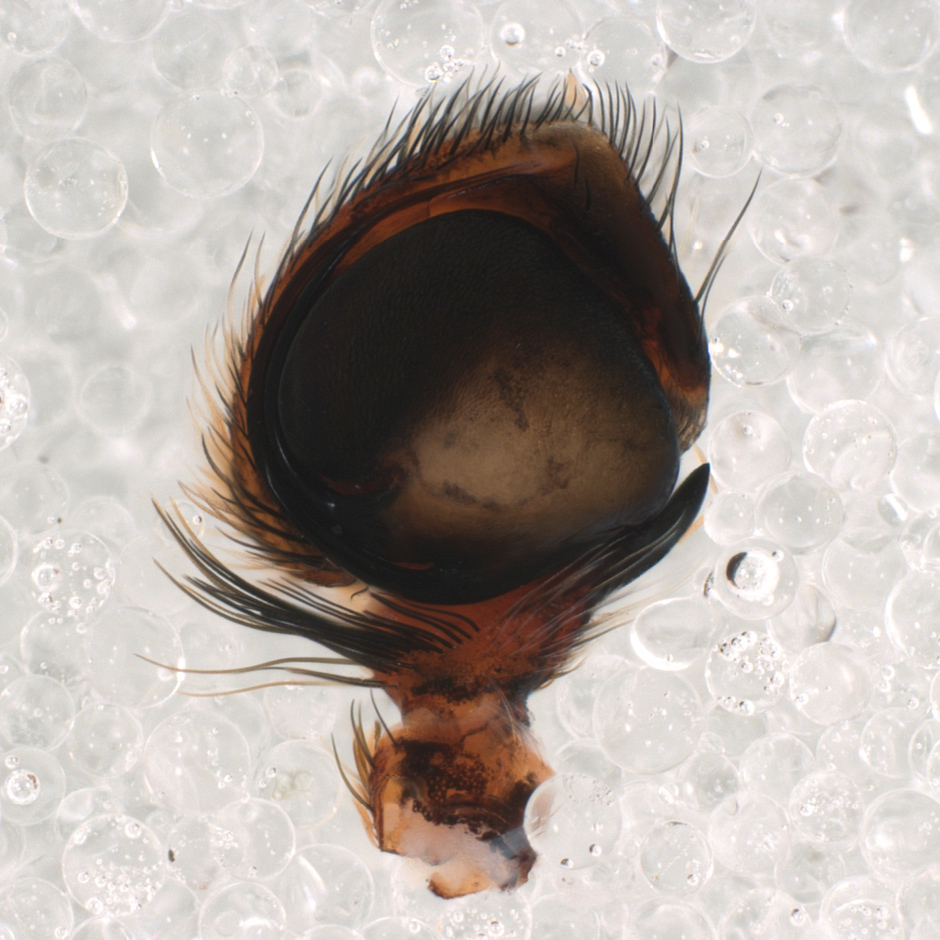
Male pedipalp

Habronattus mexicanus is a species of jumping spider in the genus Habronattus. The species was first identified in 1896 in Mexico, after which it is named, originally allocated to the genus Habrocestum. The species has subsequently been identified in locations in North and Central America, as well as islands in the Caribbean Sea. The spider is small, but displays one of the most complex sexual displays, including sophisticated vibratory song patterns.

== Description ==
Habronattus mexicanus is a small brown jumping spider. The male and female are generally similar in size and appearance. It is distinguished by the iridescent scales on its clypeus and more scales evenly distributed on its chelicerae. At the end of the pedipalp, the palpal bulb of the male spider has an embolus that sticks out at 200 degrees. The spiders undertake complex vibratory song patterns as part of their courtship, which is one of the most complicated sexual displays amongst all animals.

== Taxonomy ==
Habronattus mexicanus is a species of jumping spider. The species was named in honour of the country of Mexico. The species was originally named Habrocestum mexicanum by George and Elizabeth Peckham in 1896 but was transferred by Frederick Octavius Pickard-Cambridge to Pellenes in 1901 and subsequently to Habronattus by Jerzy Prószyński in 1976. It is the type species of that genus.

== Distribution ==
The species was first identified in Mexico from specimens collected in the areas around Refugio and Reynosa. When first described, it was believed to be restricted to Mexico. Similar spiders found in Guatemala were known as Habrocestum belligerum and Habrocestum latens in Honduras. Although originally thought of as three separate species, they were brought together in 1987, thus vastly expanding the species range. It has also been found across other areas of North America, Central America and the Caribbean, including Cuba and Texas, as well across Mexican states from Chiapas to Yucatan.

== Synonyms ==
According to the World Spider Catalog, the following are also synonyms:

- Habrocestum belligerum Peckham & Peckham, 1896
- Habrocestum latens Peckham & Peckham, 1896
- Habronattus belligerus F. O. Pickard-Cambridge, 1901
- Habronattus latens F. O. Pickard-Cambridge, 1901
- Pellenes latens Peckham & Peckham, 1901
- Pellenes belligerus Peckham & Peckham, 1901
- Pellenes hondurasus Roewer, 1951
