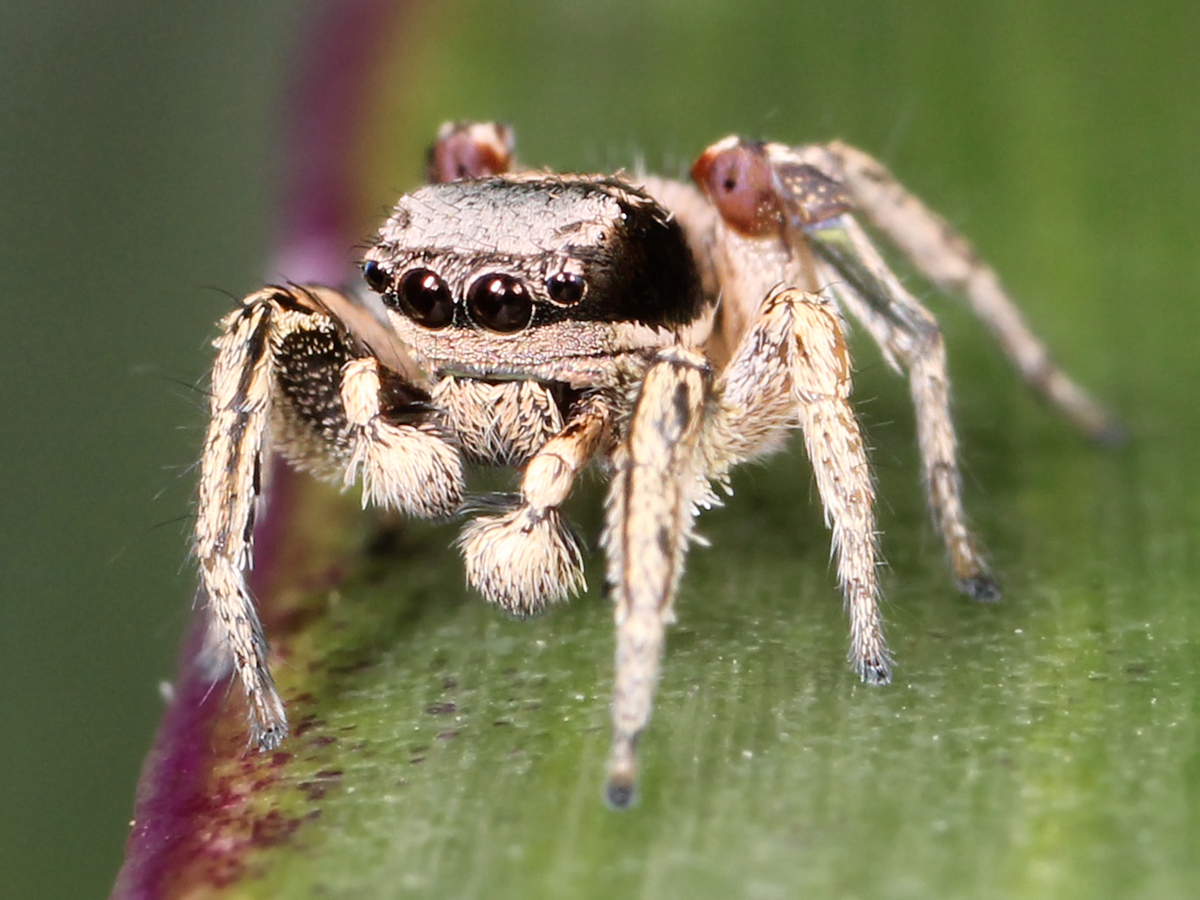
- Adult male Habronattus mexicanus

Scientific classification
- Kingdom: Animalia
- Phylum: Arthropoda
- Subphylum: Chelicerata
- Class: Arachnida
- Order: Araneae
- Infraorder: Araneomorphae
- Family: Salticidae
- Subfamily: Salticinae
- Clade: Salticoida; Maddison & Hedin, 2003

Tribes
- See text.

= Salticoida =

Clade of spiders

Salticoida is an unranked clade of the jumping spider family Salticidae. It is the larger and more widespread of the two subdivisions of the "typical" jumping spiders (subfamily Salticinae), occurring effectively world-wide. Its sister clade is Amycoida, which is also very diverse ecologically but has a mostly South American distribution.

== Systematics and evolution ==
Salticoida includes the bulk of extant jumping spider diversity, with over 400 genera organized phylogenetically into 18 tribes according to Wayne Maddison's 2015 proposal.

The age and origin of the Salticoida are not well determined. Certainly, by the late Paleogene the major lineages were recognizably distinct as indicated by the fossil evidence and molecular phylogeny. Thus, the salticoids presumably originated during or around the PETM or a bit earlier, but no corresponding fossils have been found yet. Their sister lineage, the Amycoida, probably originated by dispersal across the ocean to South America, which at the end of the Mesozoic was closest to Africa, Antarctica and North America. The major clades of salticoids are spread globally and for the most part replace each other geographically, so little can be inferred from them.

However, a comprehensive fossil record of jumping spiders from erstwhile Gondwana is only known from long after the supercontinent's breakup in the late Mesozoic, even though fossils of ancient jumping spiders are not infrequently found on the northern continents. Thus, if the Amycoida originated by dispersal over a fairly short stretch of open ocean, the Salticoida are almost certainly of North American origin. On the other hand, spiders, even if they spin no webs, are excellent at dispersing across extreme ranges by ballooning along the atmospheric circulation as juveniles. Some of these spiderlings can travel for almost a month at altitudes of several kilometres above sea level, and many species occur all around Earth in a band around one particular latitude. Dispersal from southeast Asia or Australasia all across the Pacific is thus another viable hypothesis for the amycoid-salticoid split despite the massive distance involved.

Indeed, a few minor, unusual and possibly very ancient and basal lineages of salticoids are found in and around Southeast Asia, and might be considered relicts in the ancestral range. But their relationships are not yet robustly enough determined: The Agoriini (genera Agorius, Synagelides and maybe Pseudosynagelides) are most unusual ant mimics whose relationships are entirely obscure; they are so highly autapomorphic it is hard to tell if they are truly ancient among the salticoids, or are a very strongly divergent offshoot of one of the more conventional tribes – ant mimicry has evolved convergently 5 to 10 times in the salticoids. The Baviini (Bavia, Stagetillus and possibly Piranthus) have a far less unusual appearance and at a casual glance resemble Marpissoida, which are mostly found in and around North America; the yellow-green Itata from South America are singular marpissoids of tribe Dendryphantini which except in the tell-tale synapomorphic details look almost like baviines. Whether this is similarity is superficial, atavistic or genuinely plesiomorphic is also still unresolved.
