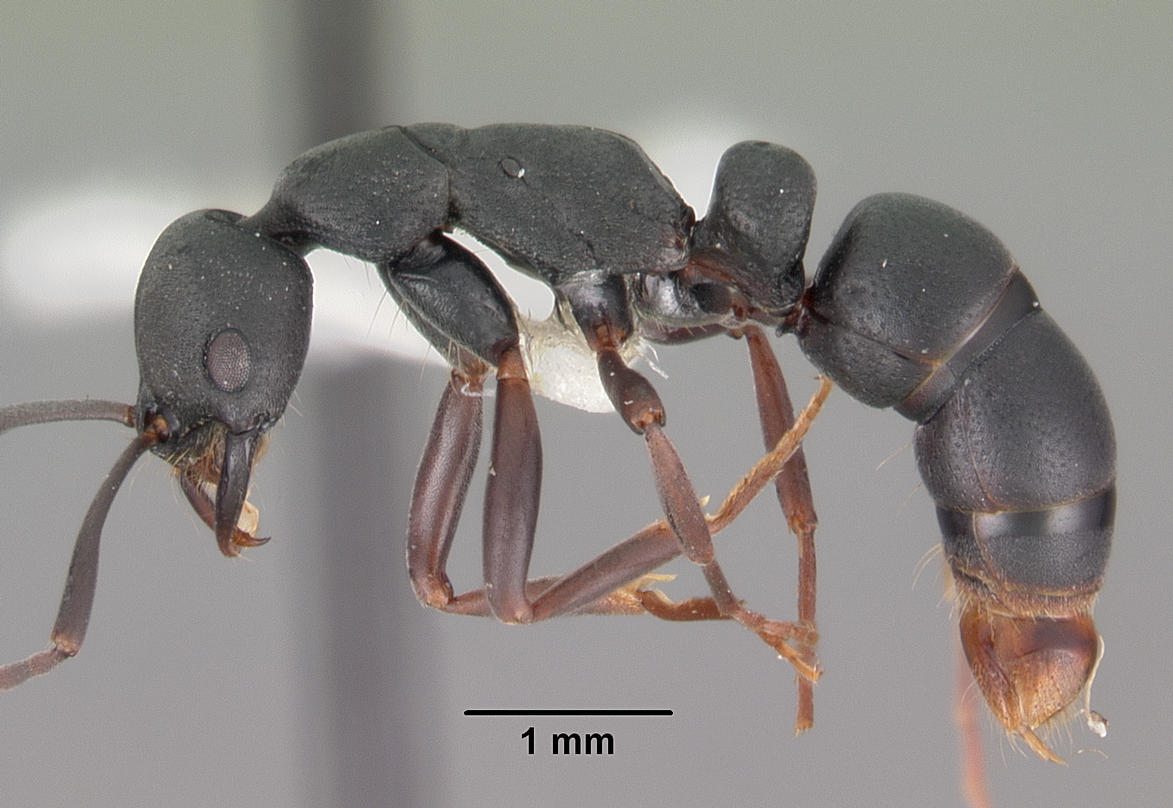
- L. maxillosa worker from the Seychelles

Scientific classification
- Kingdom: Animalia
- Phylum: Arthropoda
- Class: Insecta
- Order: Hymenoptera
- Family: Formicidae
- Subfamily: Ponerinae
- Tribe: Ponerini
- Genus: Leptogenys; Roger, 1861

Type species
- Leptogenys falcigera Roger, 1861

Diversity
- 324 species

Synonyms
- Dorylozelus Forel, 1915; Lobopelta Mayr, 1862; Machaerogenys Emery, 1911; Microbolbos Donisthorpe, 1948; Odontopelta Emery, 1911; Prionogenys Emery, 1895

= Leptogenys =

Genus of ants

Leptogenys is a genus of ants in the subfamily Ponerinae. Leptogenys is the most diverse ponerine ant genus in the world; it is widespread throughout tropical and subtropical regions and there are over 260 extant species described. Most species have ergatoid queens, and many have falcate, bowed mandibles and are specialists on isopod prey.

== Description ==
The ant genus Leptogenys is one of the most diverse and abundant ponerines throughout the tropical and subtropical regions . The genus has attracted attention due to its wide variety of social organizations and colony structures as well as its remarkably diverse range of behaviors. Leptogenys range from large-eyed epigaeic (living or foraging primarily above ground) species to small-eyed cryptobiotic species that inhabit the soil layers or forage through the leaf litter. Such variation occurs across the geographical distribution of the genus. The maxillosa species-group includes widespread species that have expanded well beyond their native ranges. The worker caste of the genus can be distinguished largely by the distinct pectinate ventral margin of the tarsal claws.

== Taxonomy ==
The taxonomic history of the genus Leptogenys includes several junior synonyms as a result of the remarkable morphological diversity in the group. Several genera and subgenera were described by earlier ant taxonomists based on variation in the shape of the mandible, the number of mandibular teeth, the form of the clypeus, the presence of teeth on the anterior clypeal margin, and the number of peg-like teeth on the ventral margin of the tarsal claws. Leptogenys now includes the following junior synonyms: Prionogenys, Lobopelta, Odontopelta, Machaerogenys, Dorylozelus, and Microbolbos. These genera originally were in their own tribe, Leptogenyini, but the morphological features used to separate this group were eventually considered insufficient, and Brown (1963) synonymized the tribe with Ponerini. A molecular phylogenetic study of the Ponerinae by Schmidt (2013) corroborates the placement of Leptogenys in the Ponerini.

== See also ==
- List of Leptogenys species
