= Hypoponera taprobanae =

Scientific classification
- Kingdom: Animalia
- Phylum: Arthropoda
- Clade: Pancrustacea
- Class: Insecta
- Order: Hymenoptera
- Family: Formicidae
- Genus: Hypoponera
- Species: H. taprobanae

Binomial name
- Hypoponera taprobanae (Forel, 1913)

Species of ant

Hypoponera taprobanae is a species of ant of the subfamily Ponerinae, which can be found in Sri Lanka.
