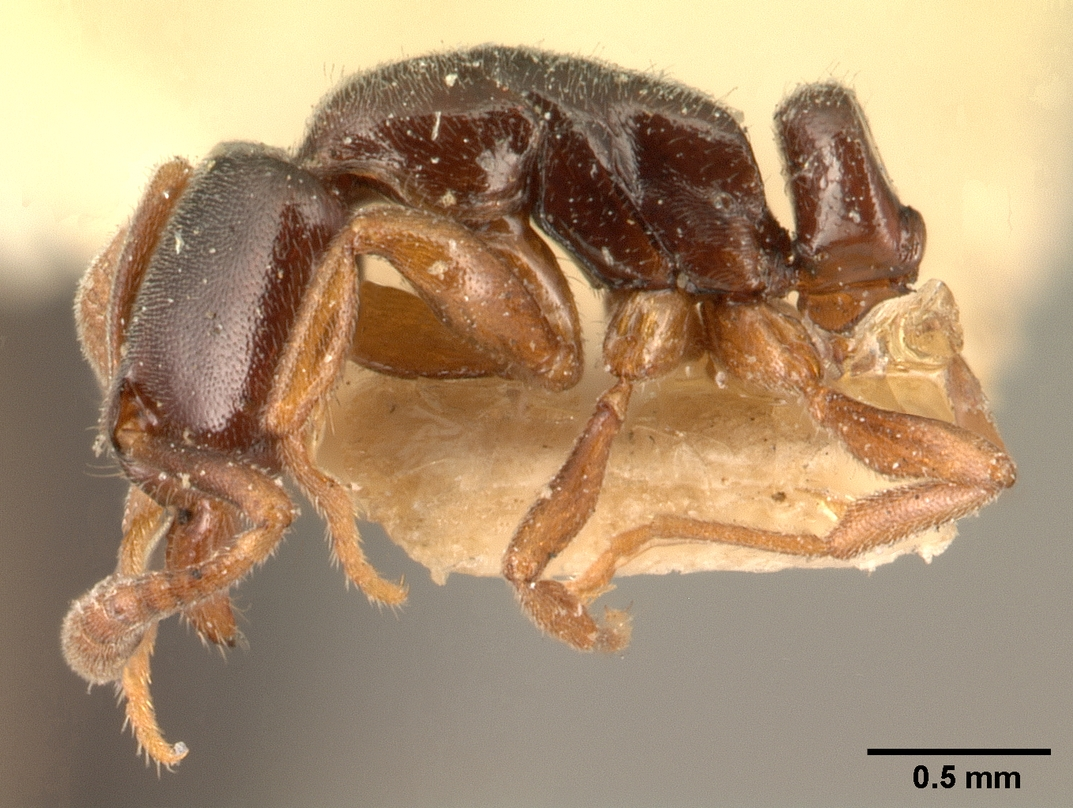

Scientific classification
- Kingdom: Animalia
- Phylum: Arthropoda
- Class: Insecta
- Order: Hymenoptera
- Family: Formicidae
- Alliance: Hypoponera genus group
- Genus: Hypoponera
- Species: H. punctatissima

Binomial name
- Hypoponera punctatissima (Roger, 1859)

= Hypoponera punctatissima =

Species of ant

Hypoponera punctatissima, or Roger's ant, is a species of Ponerine ant native to Africa but now found worldwide as a tramp species. The ant is hypothesized to have spread so effectively due to humanity's use of horses as draft animals. The ant is closely related to Hypoponera ergatandria and bears several similarities, such as colony size and appearance.

== Distribution and habitat ==
Hypoponera punctatissima is a tramp species that has invaded many countries past its native range, where it resides in heated buildings, and outdoor heated habitats such as animal waste and fermenting waste.

The ant is considered native in the Gulf of Guinea, Kenya, Uganda, Rwanda, Tanzania and Kenya. The ant is also native to much of southern Africa, with a native presence in Angola, Zambia, Mozambique, Botswana and South Africa. The species range also extends north to include Egypt, Sudan, Ethiopia, Central African Republic and the DRC.

Hypoponera punctatissima is considered invasive in much of Western Europe, some of the southern U.S.A states and California, much of the Middle East, the Yucatán peninsula, Panama and Venezuela. The ant retains an invasive presence in New Zealand, North Australia and the island of New Guinea. The species has also invaded Sri Lanka, Madagascar and the Philippines, as well as a scattered presence across other tropical regions.

The species is restricted to heated buildings and greenhouses in much of Eastern and Northern Europe, Ireland, some of southern Canada, some northern U.S. states and in areas of central Russia.

== Biology ==
Hypoponera punctatissima constructs nests across a variety of mediums, with the minimum temperature to successfully establish a colony theorized to be 21 °C. In their natural climate range, H. punctatissima nests commonly in soil, rotting wood, gardens and various disturbed habitats; however, in cooler areas, the species is known to nest in houses, greenhouses, heated buildings and manure/compost piles.

It is thought that the species' range is probably largely due to humanities' use of horses as draft animals, with their stables and dung being a suitable environment for the species' colonies. This also has led to the species being widely distributed in Great Britain, yet locally rare, most commonly found in horse stables, therefore making stables a suitable location to find and collect the ant. The species' theorized relationship with horses and other large herbivores has led to the hypothesis of the ant's local range being in the horse's natural range in Eastern Asia.

Colonies have been recorded to be polydomous, with ~200 workers. The most likely way this species is encountered is by the alate gynes above ground.

== Description ==
Hypoponera punctatissima is a yellowish-brown to dark-brown colored ant measuring 2.5-3.2mm, with short, stiff setae coating its head and body. The ant's mandibles are triangular in shape and its antennae have 12 total segments. The ant has a single-segmented petiole, as it is a member of the ponerinae sub-family where all members features single-segmented petioles. The ant's gaster has a constriction between the first two segments, with the first two segments also being twice the length of longer than remaining segments. As the ant nears the larger end of its size range, the colour can darken and as the ant approaches its smaller range it can be a lighter, more yellowish colour however the correlation is not a very consistent rule.

Queens of the species are very similar to the working caste, however are slightly larger and bear wings for flight, as well as having the remanent of their enlarged wing muscles. Queens also are slightly larger, measuring 3.5-3.8mm. Ergatoid males of this species fall into two categories, the first group being smaller, yellower and eyeless and the second being larger, darker colored and retaining their eyes. Alate males have not yet been observed and are assumed to not be present in this species. Males are typically slightly smaller than queens but larger than workers, measuring 3.4-3.6mm.

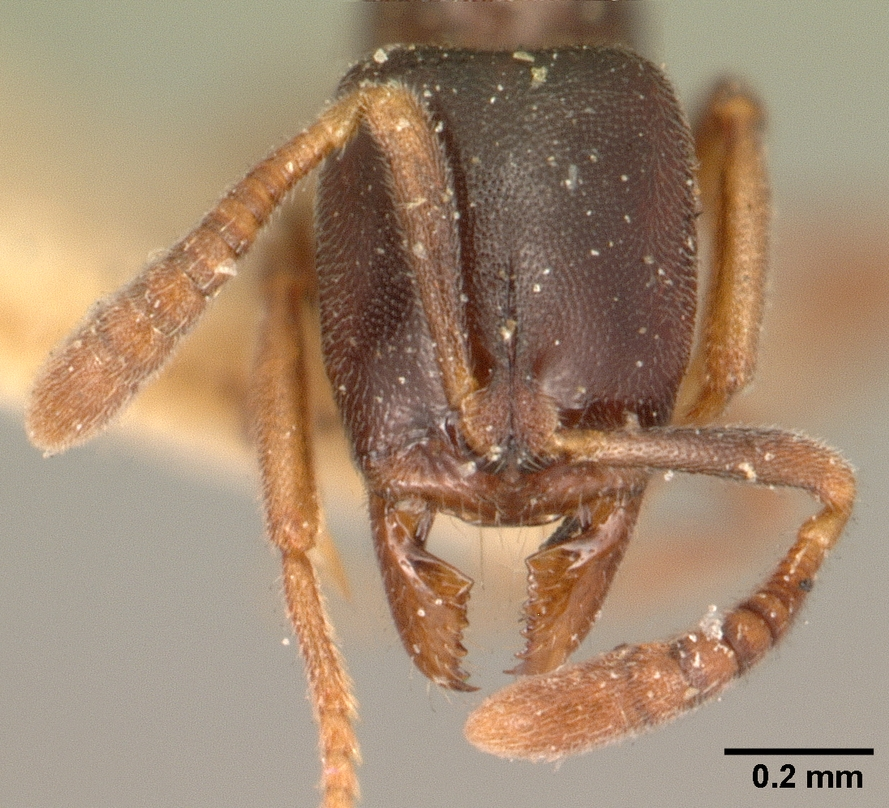
Hypoponera punctatissima indefferens head

== Subspecies ==
These three subspecies belong to the species Hypoponera punctatissima:

- Hypoponera punctatissima indifferens (Forel, 1895)^{i c g}
- Hypoponera punctatissima jugata (Forel, 1892)^{i g}
- Hypoponera punctatissima punctatissima (Roger, 1859)^{i c g}

Data sources: i = ITIS, c = Catalogue of Life, g = GBIF
