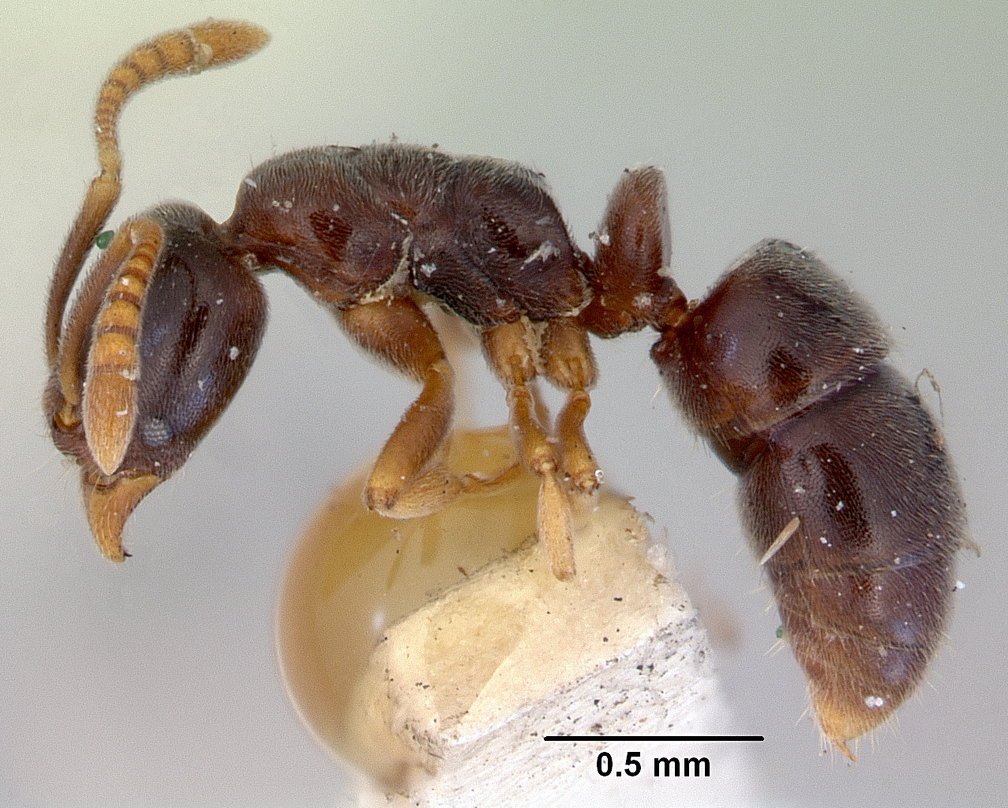
- Hypoponera eduardi worker

Scientific classification
- Kingdom: Animalia
- Phylum: Arthropoda
- Clade: Pancrustacea
- Class: Insecta
- Order: Hymenoptera
- Family: Formicidae
- Subfamily: Ponerinae
- Tribe: Ponerini
- Alliance: Hypoponera genus group
- Genus: Hypoponera; Santschi, 1938

Type species
- Ponera abeillei

Diversity
- 154 (living), 2 (extinct)

= Hypoponera =

Genus of ants

Hypoponera is a genus of ants in the subfamily Ponerinae. The genus has a worldwide distribution and is found in all continents except Antarctica, as well as lacking a presence in taiga or tundra biomes, and central Asia.

== Description ==
The genus has stout, triangular mandibles and 12 segmented anntennae. Species in this genus typically do not have eyes, and when present are always very small; however, queen's typically have large eyes, with setae between the ommatidia. When viewed in profile, the petiole is usually more slender and often more tapered dorsally than in workers. Males typically have large eyes, with setae protruding between the ommatidia and 13 segmented antennae. Ergatoid males are extremely worker-like, with male genitalia present. Antennae are either 12 or 13 segmented and eyes can be either present or absent.

== Species ==
- Hypoponera abeillei (André, 1881)
- Hypoponera agilis (Borgmeier, 1934)
- Hypoponera albopubescens (Menozzi, 1939)
- Hypoponera aliena (Smith, 1858)
- Hypoponera angustata (Santschi, 1914)
- Hypoponera aprora Bolton & Fisher, 2011
- Hypoponera argentina (Santschi, 1922)
- Hypoponera assmuthi (Forel, 1905)
- †Hypoponera atavia (Mayr, 1868)
- Hypoponera austra Bolton & Fisher, 2011
- Hypoponera beebei (Wheeler, 1924)
- Hypoponera beppin Terayama, 1999
- Hypoponera biroi (Emery, 1900)
- Hypoponera blanda Bolton & Fisher, 2011
- Hypoponera boerorum (Forel, 1901)
- Hypoponera bugnioni (Forel, 1912)
- Hypoponera bulawayensis (Forel, 1913)
- Hypoponera butteli (Forel, 1913)
- Hypoponera camerunensis (Santschi, 1914)
- Hypoponera ceylonensis (Mayr, 1897)
- Hypoponera clavatula (Emery, 1906)
- Hypoponera coeca (Santschi, 1914)
- Hypoponera collegiana (Santschi, 1925)
- Hypoponera comis Bolton & Fisher, 2011
- Hypoponera confinis (Roger, 1860)
- Hypoponera congrua (Wheeler, 1934)
- Hypoponera convexiuscula (Forel, 1900)
- Hypoponera creola (Menozzi, 1931)
- Hypoponera decora (Clark, 1934)
- Hypoponera defessa Bolton & Fisher, 2011
- Hypoponera dema Bolton & Fisher, 2011
- Hypoponera dis Bolton & Fisher, 2011
- Hypoponera distinguenda (Emery, 1890)
- Hypoponera dulcis (Forel, 1907)
- Hypoponera eduardi (Forel, 1894)
- †Hypoponera electrocacica Fiorentino et al., 2026
- Hypoponera elliptica (Forel, 1900)
- Hypoponera emeryi (Donisthorpe, 1943)
- Hypoponera ergatandria (Forel, 1893)
- Hypoponera eutrepta (Wilson, 1958)
- Hypoponera exigua Bolton & Fisher, 2011
- Hypoponera exoecata (Wheeler, 1928)
- Hypoponera faceta (Menozzi, 1931)
- Hypoponera faex Bolton & Fisher, 2011
- Hypoponera fatiga Bolton & Fisher, 2011
- Hypoponera fenestralis (Gallardo, 1918)
- Hypoponera fiebrigi (Forel, 1908)
- Hypoponera foeda (Forel, 1893)
- Hypoponera foreli (Mayr, 1887)
- Hypoponera gibbinota (Forel, 1912)
- Hypoponera grandidieri (Santschi, 1921)
- Hypoponera hawkesi Bolton & Fisher, 2011
- Hypoponera hebes Bolton & Fisher, 2011
- Hypoponera herbertonensis (Forel, 1915)
- Hypoponera idelettae (Santschi, 1923)
- Hypoponera ignavia Bolton & Fisher, 2011
- Hypoponera ignigera (Menozzi, 1927)
- Hypoponera iheringi (Forel, 1908)
- Hypoponera importuna Bolton & Fisher, 2011
- Hypoponera inaudax (Santschi, 1919)
- Hypoponera indigens (Forel, 1895)
- Hypoponera inexorata (Wheeler, 1903)
- Hypoponera javana (Forel, 1905)
- Hypoponera jeanneli (Santschi, 1935)
- Hypoponera jocosa Bolton & Fisher, 2011
- Hypoponera johannae (Forel, 1891)
- Hypoponera juxta Bolton & Fisher, 2011
- Hypoponera kashmirensis Bharit, 2015
- Hypoponera lassa Bolton & Fisher, 2011
- Hypoponera lea (Santschi, 1937)
- Hypoponera leninei (Santschi, 1925)
- Hypoponera lepida Bolton & Fisher, 2011
- Hypoponera longiceps (Forel, 1913)
- Hypoponera leveillei (Emery, 1890 incertae sedis)
- Hypoponera ludovicae (Forel, 1892)
- Hypoponera lumpurensis (Forel, 1907)
- Hypoponera mackayensis (Forel, 1900)
- Hypoponera macradelphe (Wilson, 1958)
- Hypoponera madecassa (Santschi, 1938)
- Hypoponera malayana (Wheeler, 1929)
- Hypoponera massiliensis (Bondroit, 1920)
- Hypoponera menozzii (Santschi, 1932)
- Hypoponera meridia Bolton & Fisher, 2011
- Hypoponera mesoponeroides (Radchenko, 1993)
- Hypoponera mixta Bolton & Fisher, 2011
- Hypoponera molesta Bolton & Fisher, 2011
- Hypoponera monticola (Mann, 1921)
- Hypoponera natalensis (Santschi, 1914)
- Hypoponera neglecta (Santschi, 1923)
- Hypoponera nippona (Santschi, 1937)
- Hypoponera nitidula (Emery, 1890)
- Hypoponera nivariana (Santschi, 1908)
- Hypoponera nubatama Terayama & Hashimoto, 1996
- Hypoponera obtunsa Bolton & Fisher, 2011
- Hypoponera occidentalis (Bernard, 1953)
- Hypoponera odiosa Bolton & Fisher, 2011
- Hypoponera opaciceps (Mayr, 1887)
- Hypoponera opacior (Forel, 1893)
- Hypoponera orba (Emery, 1915)
- Hypoponera pallidula (Emery, 1900)
- Hypoponera papuana (Emery, 1900)
- Hypoponera parva (Forel, 1909)
- Hypoponera perparva Bolton & Fisher, 2011
- Hypoponera perplexa (Mann, 1922)
- Hypoponera pia (Forel, 1901)
- Hypoponera producta Bolton & Fisher, 2011
- Hypoponera pruinosa (Emery, 1900)
- Hypoponera pulchra Bolton & Fisher, 2011
- Hypoponera punctatissima (Roger, 1859)
- Hypoponera punctiventris (Emery, 1901)
- Hypoponera pygmaea (Forel, 1907)
- Hypoponera quaestio Bolton & Fisher, 2011
- Hypoponera queenslandensis (Forel, 1900)
- Hypoponera ragusai (Emery, 1894)
- Hypoponera rectidens (Clark, 1934)
- Hypoponera regis Bolton & Fisher, 2011
- Hypoponera reichenspergeri (Santschi, 1923)
- Hypoponera rigida Bolton & Fisher, 2011
- Hypoponera rylin Fisher, 2025
- Hypoponera sabronae (Donisthorpe, 1941)
- Hypoponera sakalava (Forel, 1891)
- Hypoponera sauteri Onoyama, 1989
- Hypoponera schmalzi (Emery, 1896)
- Hypoponera schmidti (Bharti, 2015)
- Hypoponera schwebeli (Forel, 1913)
- Hypoponera scitula (Clark, 1934)
- Hypoponera segnis Bolton & Fisher, 2011
- Hypoponera shattucki (Bharti,2015)
- Hypoponera silvestrii (Donisthorpe, 1947)
- Hypoponera sinuosa (Bernard, 1953)
- Hypoponera siremps (Forel, 1901)
- Hypoponera sororcula (Wilson, 1958)
- Hypoponera spei (Forel, 1910)
- Hypoponera stoica (Santschi, 1912)
- Hypoponera sulcatinasis (Santschi, 1914)
- Hypoponera sulciceps (Clark, 1928)
- Hypoponera surda Bolton & Fisher, 2011
- Hypoponera taprobanae (Forel, 1913)
- Hypoponera tecta Bolton & Fisher, 2011
- Hypoponera tenella (Emery, 1901)
- Hypoponera traegaordhi (Santschi, 1914)
- Hypoponera transvaalensis (Arnold, 1947)
- Hypoponera trigona (Mayr, 1887)
- Hypoponera tristis Bolton & Fisher, 2011
- Hypoponera truncata (Smith, 1860)
- Hypoponera turaga (Mann, 1921)
- Hypoponera ursa (Santschi, 1924)
- Hypoponera vanreesi (Forel, 1912)
- Hypoponera veltan Fisher, 2025
- Hypoponera venusta Bolton & Fisher, 2011
- Hypoponera vernacula (Kempf, 1962)
- Hypoponera viri (Santschi, 1923)
- Hypoponera vitiensis (Mann, 1921)
- Hypoponera wilsoni (Santschi, 1925)
- Hypoponera wroughtonii (Forel,1900)
- Hypoponera zwaluwenburgi (Wheeler, 1933)
