= Hypoponera ceylonensis =

Scientific classification
- Kingdom: Animalia
- Phylum: Arthropoda
- Clade: Pancrustacea
- Class: Insecta
- Order: Hymenoptera
- Family: Formicidae
- Genus: Hypoponera
- Species: H. ceylonensis

Binomial name
- Hypoponera ceylonensis (Mayr, 1897)

Species of ant

Hypoponera ceylonensis is a species of ant of the subfamily Ponerinae, which can be found from Sri Lanka, and China.
