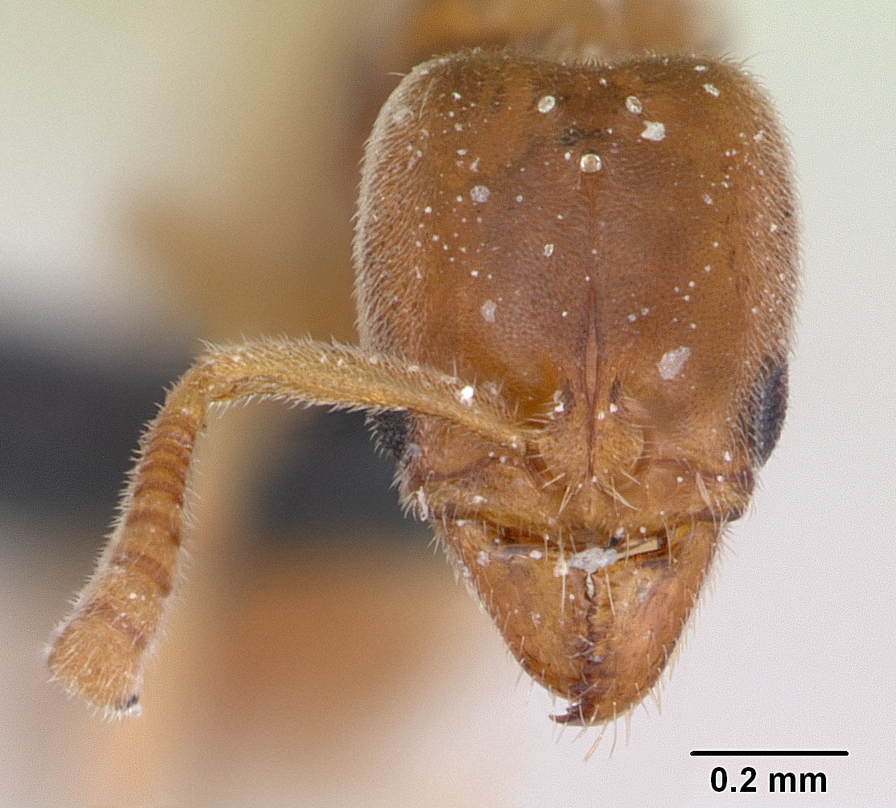

Scientific classification
- Kingdom: Animalia
- Phylum: Arthropoda
- Class: Insecta
- Order: Hymenoptera
- Family: Formicidae
- Genus: Hypoponera
- Species: H. ergatandria

Binomial name
- Hypoponera ergatandria Forel, 1893

Synonyms
- Hypoponera schauinslandi

= Hypoponera ergatandria =

Species of ant

Hypoponera ergatandria is a species of ant closely related to Hypoponera punctatissima and native to Tanzania, South Africa, Kenya and Zimbabwe; however, it is also present in western Europe as an indoor-only species, present exclusively within heated buildings and greenhouses.

== Distribution and habitat ==
Hypoponera ergatandria is native to South Africa, Zimbabwe, Kenya and Tanzania, though is also present in some areas of Europe, inhabiting greenhouses and heated buildings. Its European population is present in the UK, France, Spain, Germany, Norway, Czech Republic, Slovakia, Switzerland, Poland and the lowland countries.

The ant has an invasive presence in much of the Caribbean, the Yucatan Peninsula, the eastern Mexican coast, Costa Rica, Paraguay, Peru, California, Hawaii and the island of Java.

== Description ==
Hypoponera ergatandria is overall a brown colour, with single petiole and a constriction between the first and second segments of the gaster. It is slightly smaller than Hypoponera punctatissima and the easiest way to differentiate between gynes is measuring head and scape length.

== Biology ==
Hypoponera ergatandria is known to be polydomous, with their colonies containing of several queens, a few wingless males and around 200 workers.

Workers are known to forage for very small soil living arthropods.

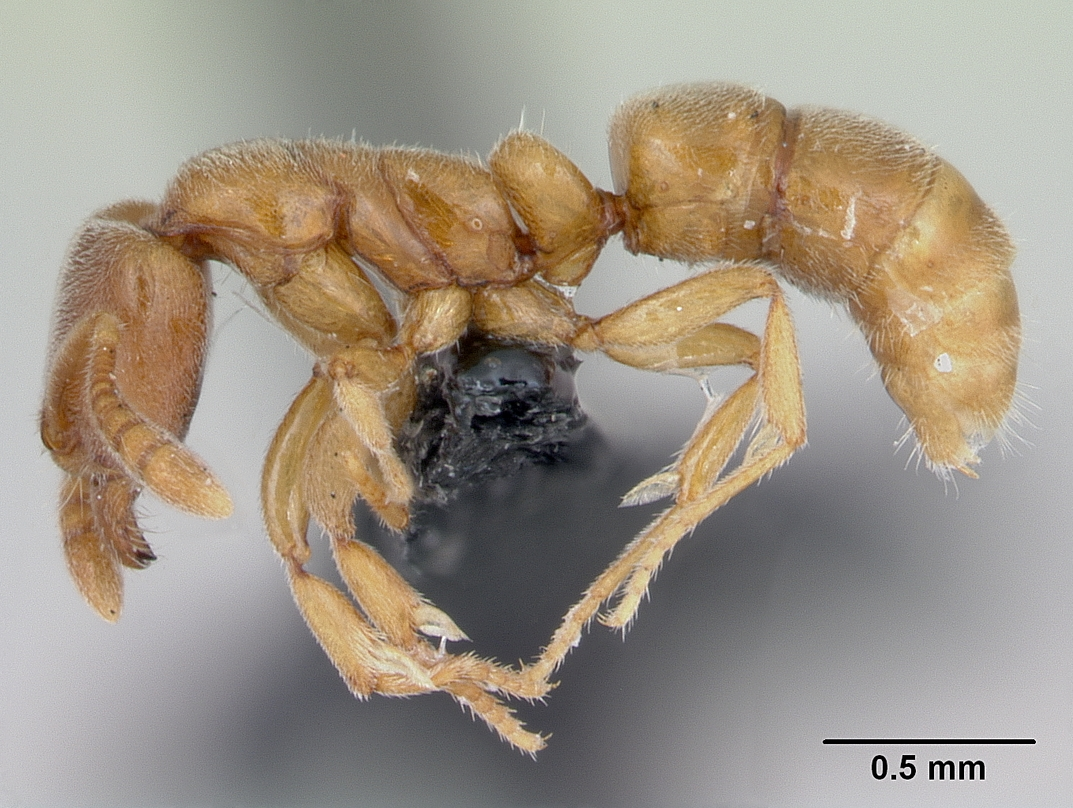
Hypoponera ergatandria profile view

The species is largely underground, and only the alate gynes are likely to be seen above ground.

In Britain, their flight period was observed to be November – February, which is very unusual for most ant species. This unusual flight is thought to be because of shorter day length, despite some sites have observed winged gynes emerging as early as August.
