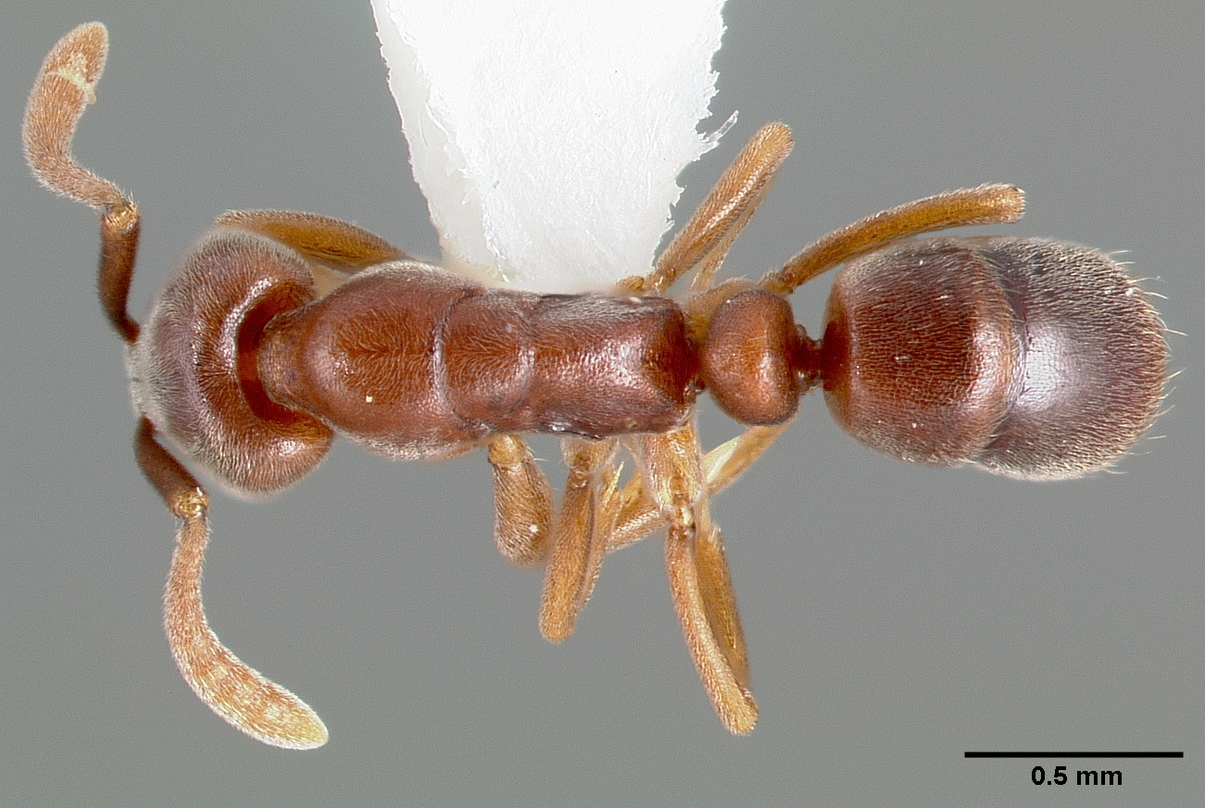

Scientific classification
- Domain: Eukaryota
- Kingdom: Animalia
- Phylum: Arthropoda
- Class: Insecta
- Order: Hymenoptera
- Family: Formicidae
- Genus: Hypoponera
- Species: H. opaciceps

Binomial name
- Hypoponera opaciceps (Mayr, 1887)

= Hypoponera opaciceps =

Species of ant

Hypoponera opaciceps is a species of ant in the family Formicidae.

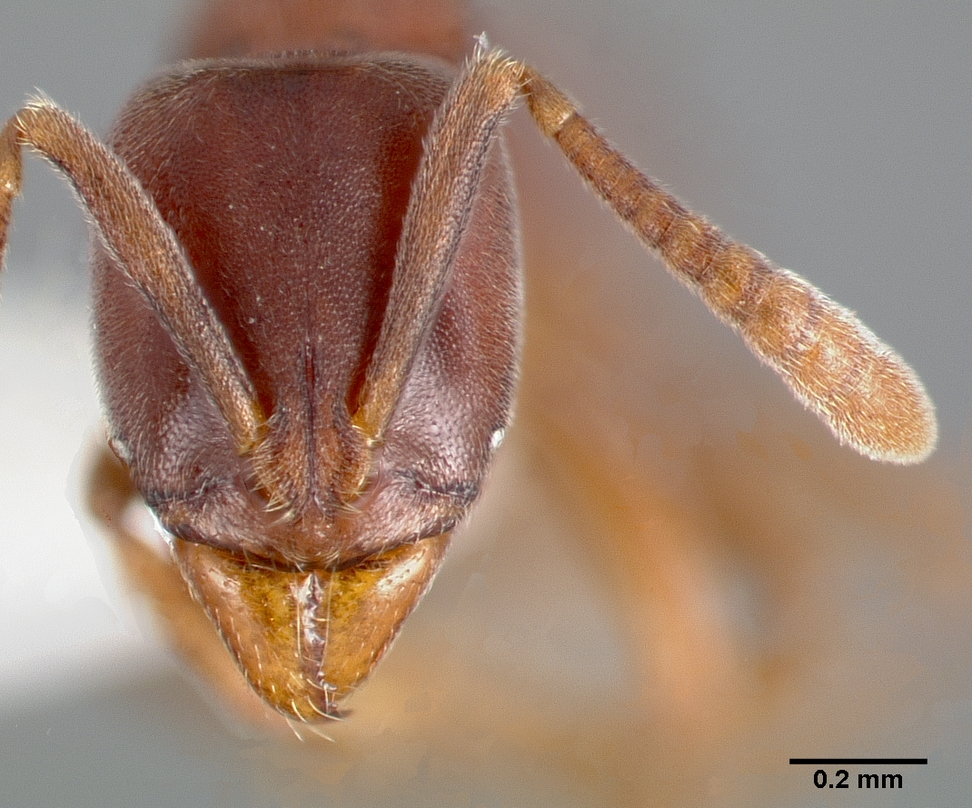

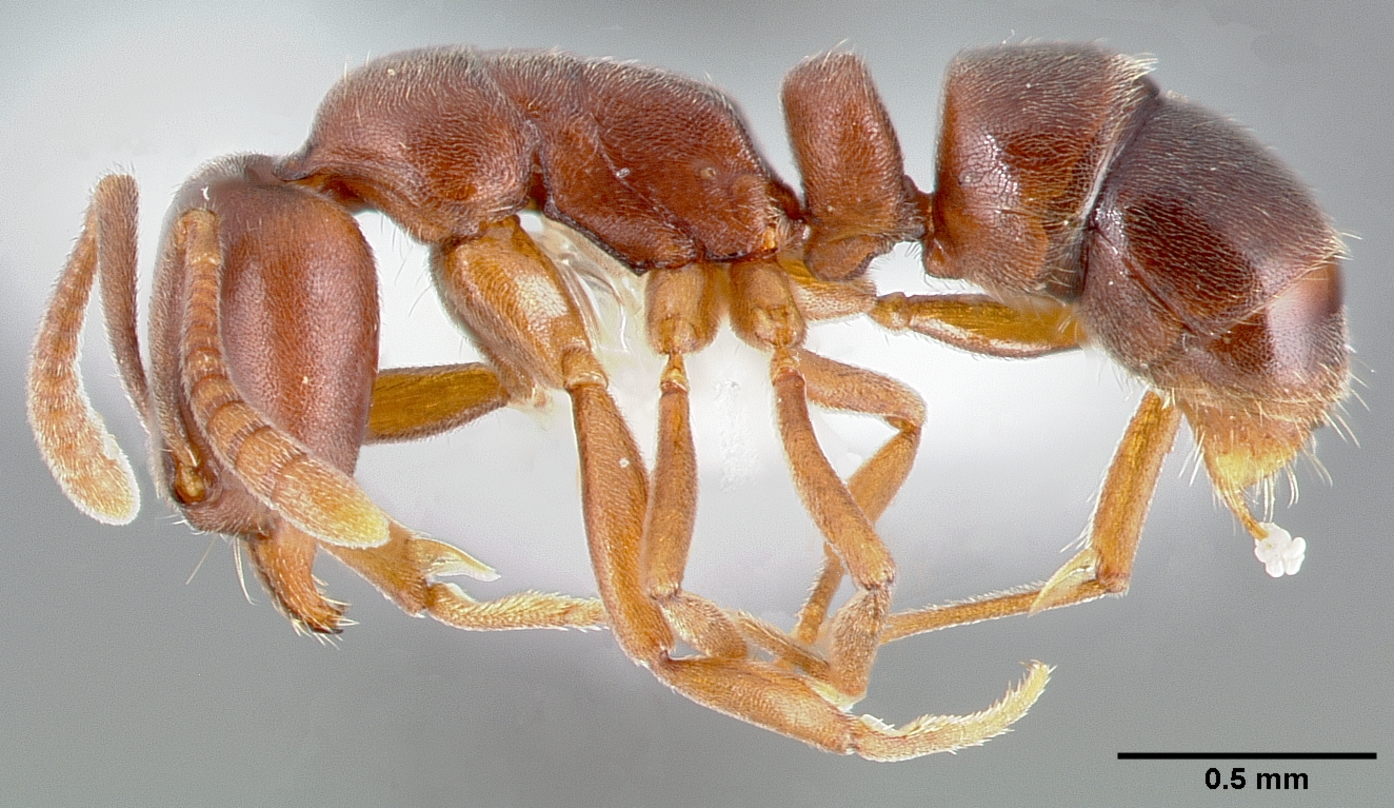

== Subspecies ==
These seven subspecies belong to the species Hypoponera opaciceps:

- Hypoponera opaciceps cubana (Santschi, 1930)^{i c}
- Hypoponera opaciceps gaigei (Forel, 1914)^{i c g}
- Hypoponera opaciceps gibbinota (Forel, 1912)^{i c}
- Hypoponera opaciceps jamaicensis (Aguayo, 1932)^{i c g}
- Hypoponera opaciceps opaciceps (Mayr, 1887)^{i c g}
- Hypoponera opaciceps pampana (Santschi, 1925)^{i c}
- Hypoponera opaciceps postangustata (Forel, 1908)^{i c g}

Data sources: i = ITIS, c = Catalogue of Life, g = GBIF, b = Bugguide.net
