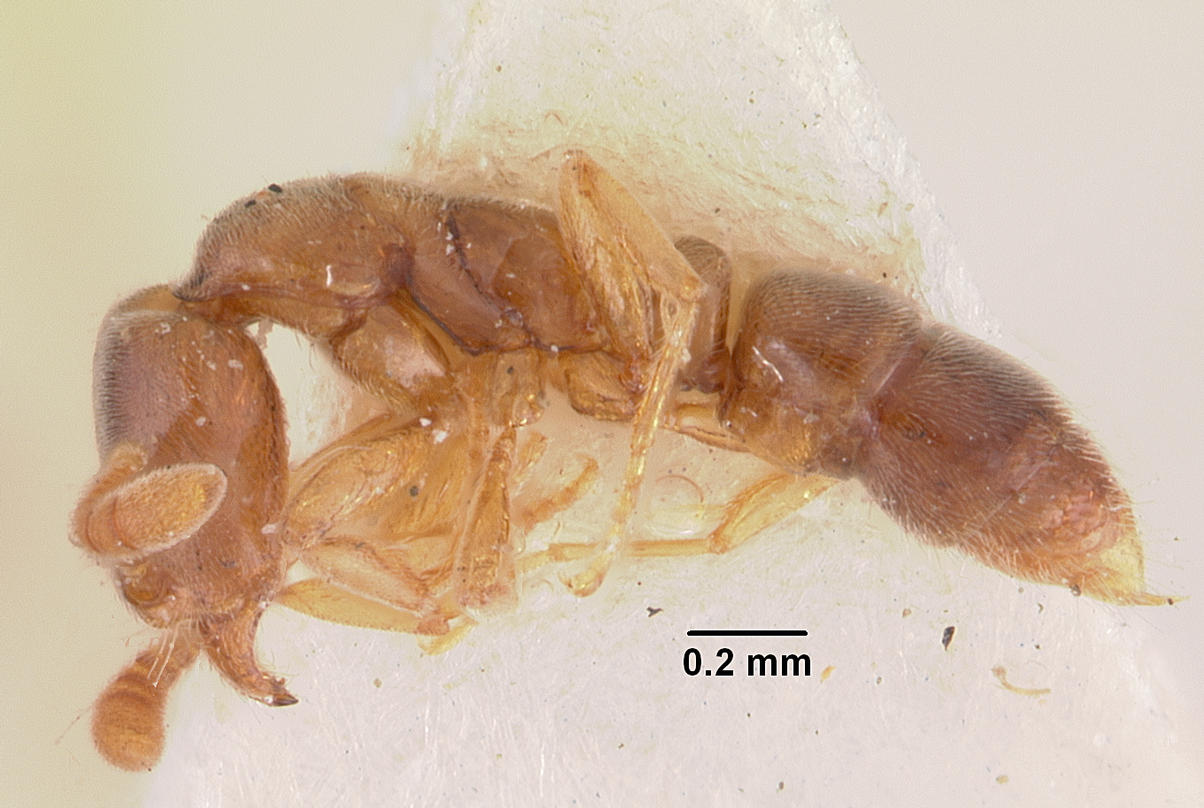

Scientific classification
- Kingdom: Animalia
- Phylum: Arthropoda
- Clade: Pancrustacea
- Class: Insecta
- Order: Hymenoptera
- Family: Formicidae
- Genus: Hypoponera
- Species: H. ragusai

Binomial name
- Hypoponera ragusai (Emery, 1894)

Synonyms
- Ponera gleadowi Forel, 1895; Ponera gleadowi aethiopica Forel, 1907; Ponera gleadowii decipiens Forel, 1899; Ponera gyptis Santschi, 1921; Ponera japonica formosae Forel, 1913; Ponera lesnei Bondroit, 1916; Ponera massiliensis Bondroit, 1920; Ponera oblongiceps Smith, M.R., 1939; Ponera parva Bondroit, 1918; Ponera ragusai santschii Emery, 1909

= Hypoponera ragusai =

Species of ant

Hypoponera ragusai, is a species of ant of the subfamily Ponerinae, which can be found in many Asian and Oceanian countries.
