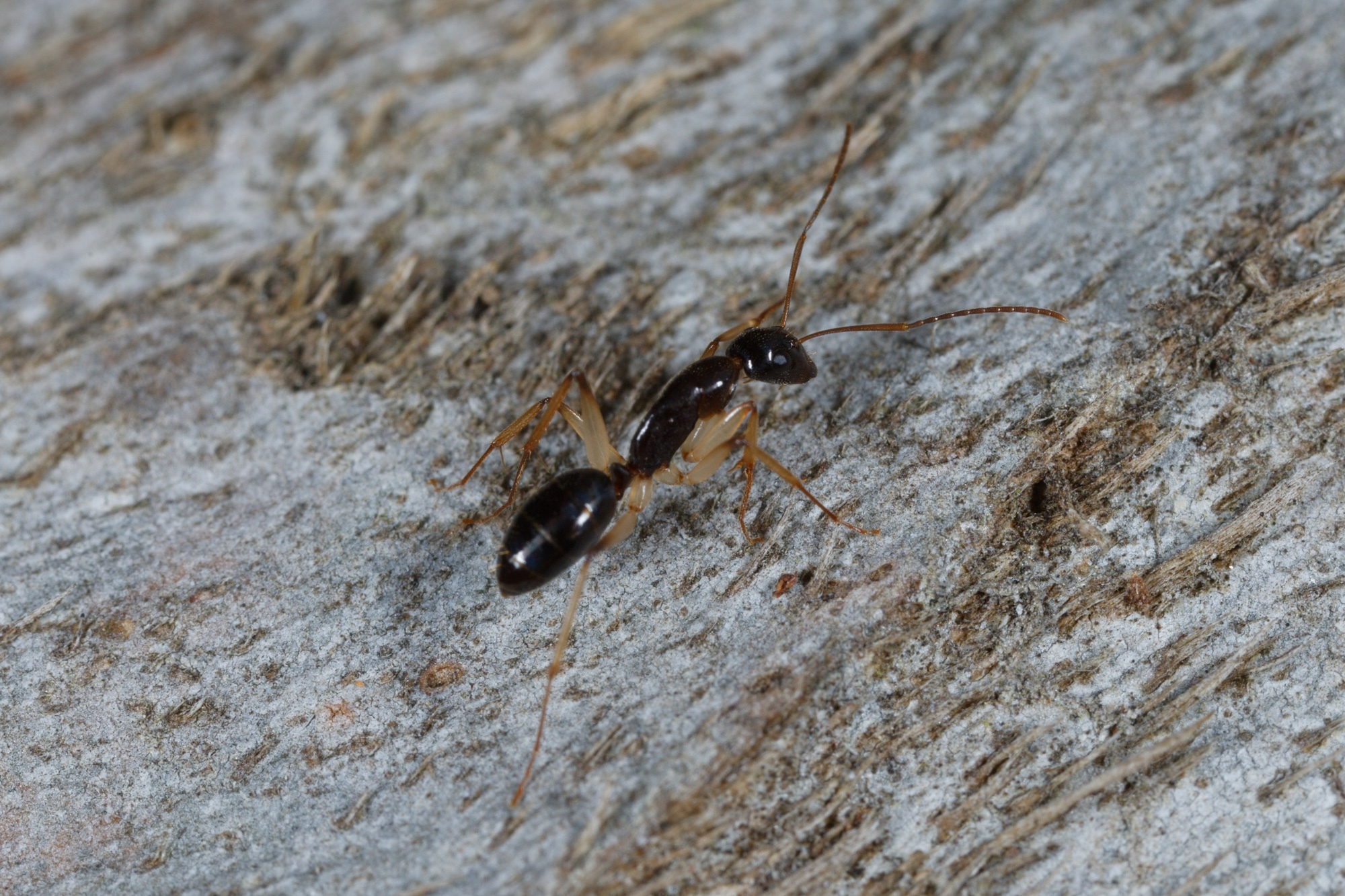

Scientific classification
- Kingdom: Animalia
- Phylum: Arthropoda
- Clade: Pancrustacea
- Class: Insecta
- Order: Hymenoptera
- Family: Formicidae
- Subfamily: Formicinae
- Genus: Camponotus
- Subgenus: Myrmophyma
- Species: C. elegans

Binomial name
- Camponotus elegans Forel, 1902

Synonyms
- Camponotus claripes elegans (Forel, 1902)

= Camponotus elegans =

Species of ant

Camponotus elegans is a species of carpenter ants found in South East Queensland and Western Australia.

== See also ==
- List of Camponotus species
- List of ants of Australia
