= Camponotus altivagans =

Scientific classification
- Kingdom: Animalia
- Phylum: Arthropoda
- Clade: Pancrustacea
- Class: Insecta
- Order: Hymenoptera
- Family: Formicidae
- Subfamily: Formicinae
- Genus: Camponotus
- Subgenus: Myrmeurynota
- Species: C. altivagans

Binomial name
- Camponotus altivagans Wheeler, 1936

Species of ant

Camponotus altivagans is a species of carpenter ant (genus Camponotus) found in Haiti and the Greater Antilles.
