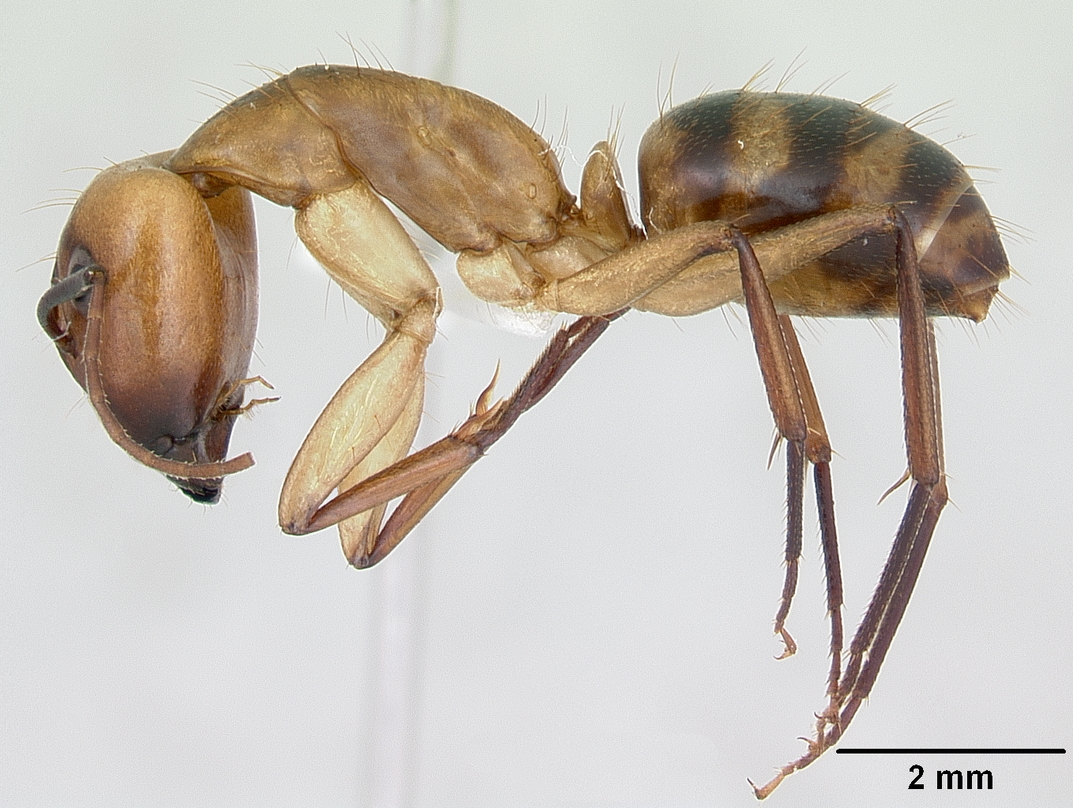

Scientific classification
- Domain: Eukaryota
- Kingdom: Animalia
- Phylum: Arthropoda
- Class: Insecta
- Order: Hymenoptera
- Family: Formicidae
- Subfamily: Formicinae
- Genus: Camponotus
- Subgenus: Tanaemyrmex
- Species: C. conspicuus

Binomial name
- Camponotus conspicuus (Smith, F., 1858)

= Camponotus conspicuus =

Species of ant

Camponotus conspicuus is a species of carpenter ant native to Mexico, Central America, the Caribbean, Ecuador, and Colombia.
