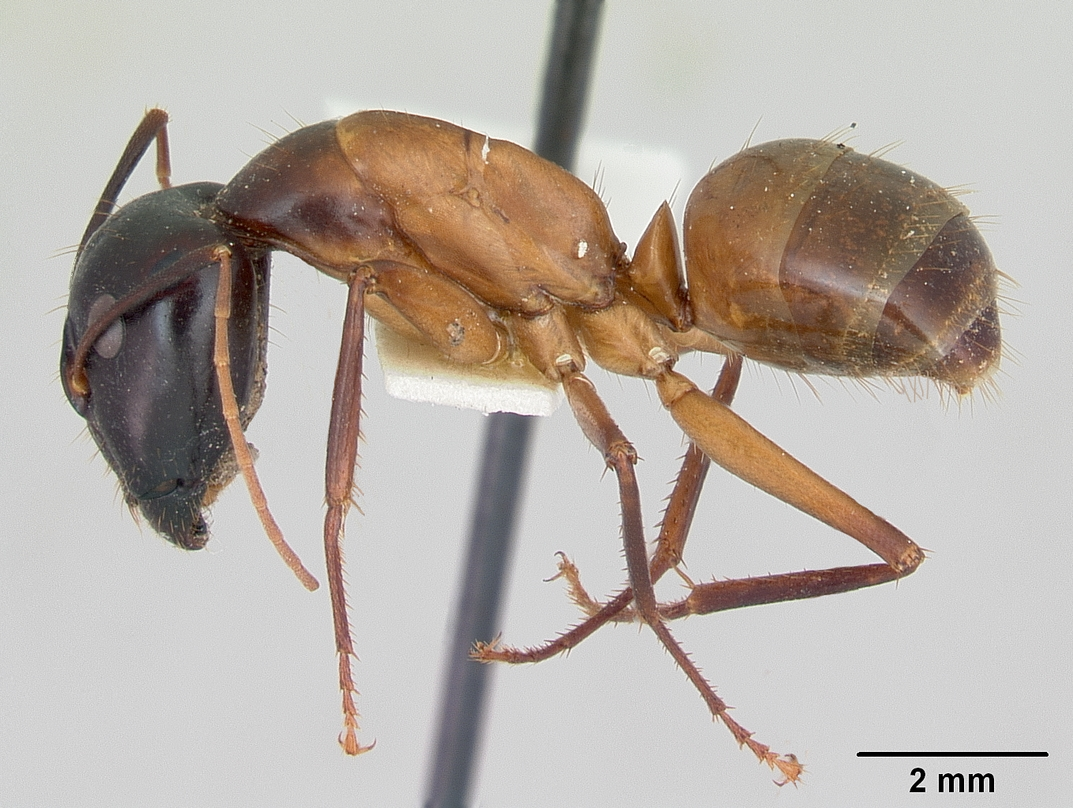

Scientific classification
- Kingdom: Animalia
- Phylum: Arthropoda
- Clade: Pancrustacea
- Class: Insecta
- Order: Hymenoptera
- Family: Formicidae
- Subfamily: Formicinae
- Genus: Camponotus
- Subgenus: Tanaemyrmex
- Species: C. acutirostris

Binomial name
- Camponotus acutirostris Wheeler, W.M., 1910

Synonyms
- C. acutirostris clarigaster Wheeler, W.M., 1915

= Camponotus acutirostris =

Species of ant

Camponotus acutirostris is a species of carpenter ant native to Utah, Arizona, New Mexico, Texas, Chihuahua, and Baja California.
