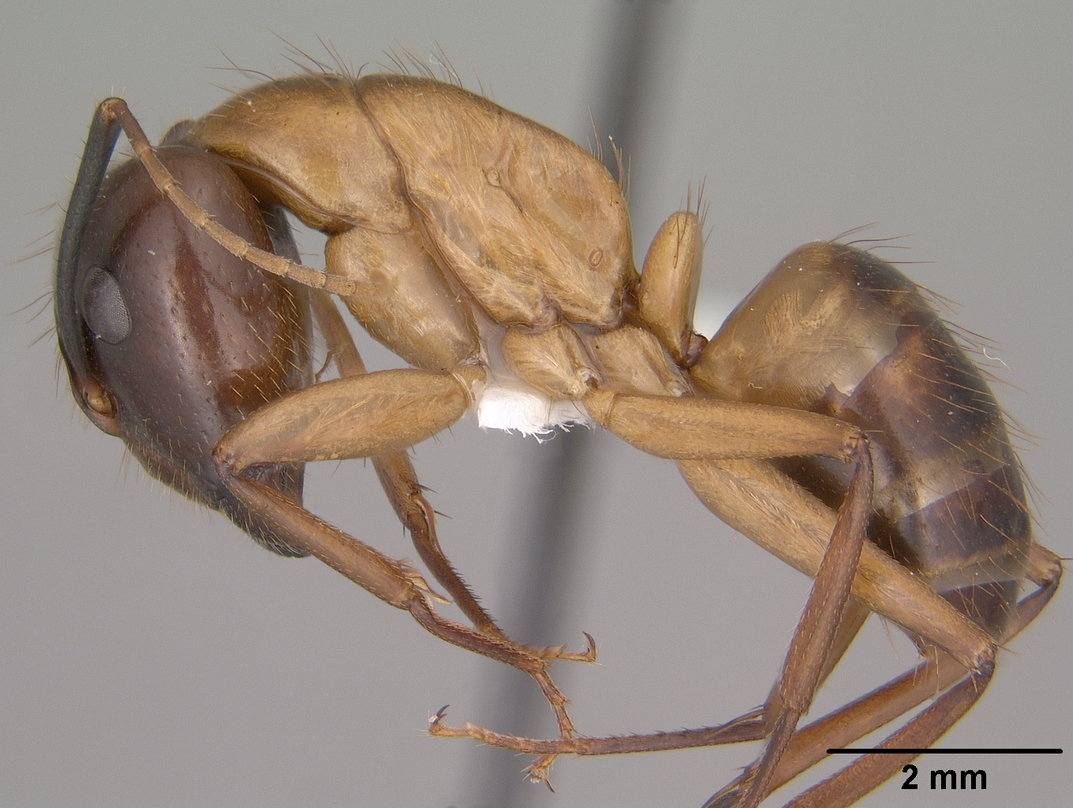

Scientific classification
- Domain: Eukaryota
- Kingdom: Animalia
- Phylum: Arthropoda
- Class: Insecta
- Order: Hymenoptera
- Family: Formicidae
- Subfamily: Formicinae
- Genus: Camponotus
- Subgenus: Tanaemyrmex
- Species: C. vafer

Binomial name
- Camponotus vafer Wheeler, 1910

= Camponotus vafer =

Species of ant

Camponotus vafer is a species of carpenter ant native to northern Mexico, Texas, New Mexico, Oklahoma, Arizona, and possibly Wyoming.
