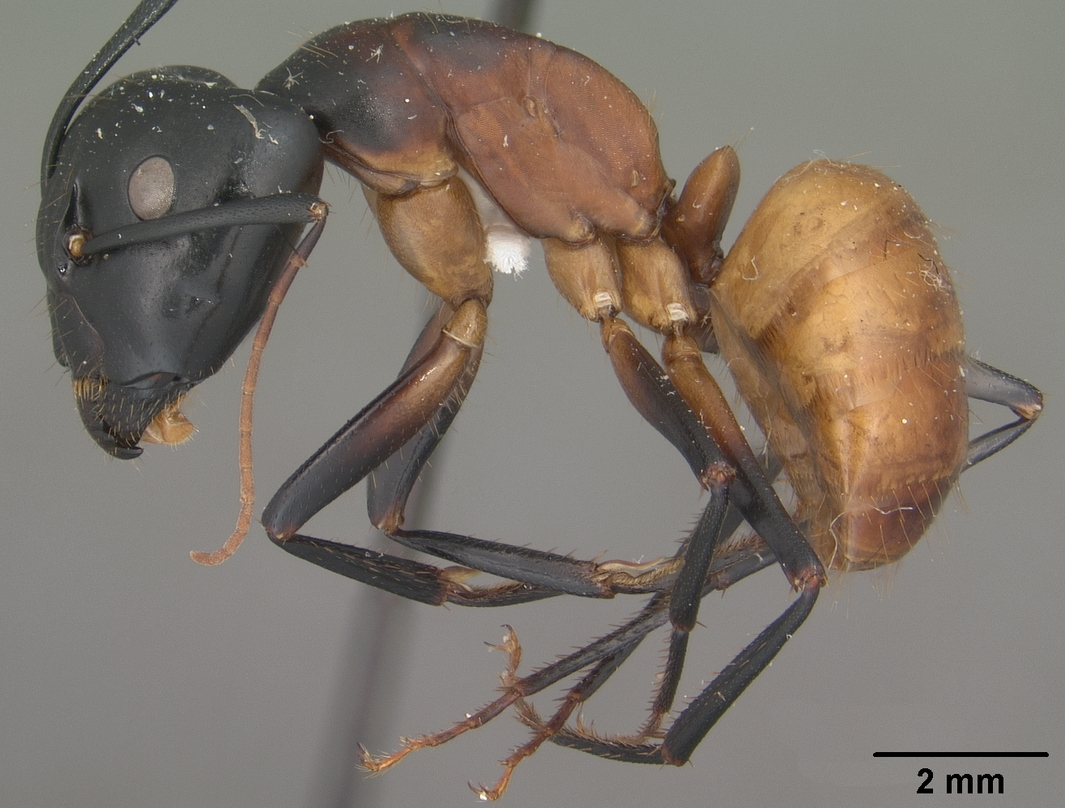

Scientific classification
- Domain: Eukaryota
- Kingdom: Animalia
- Phylum: Arthropoda
- Class: Insecta
- Order: Hymenoptera
- Family: Formicidae
- Subfamily: Formicinae
- Genus: Camponotus
- Subgenus: Tanaemyrmex
- Species: C. ocreatus

Binomial name
- Camponotus ocreatus Emery, 1893

Synonyms
- Camponotus acutirostris primipilaris Wheeler, W.M., 1910

= Camponotus ocreatus =

Species of ant

Camponotus ocreatus is a species of carpenter ant native to northern Mexico and the southwestern United States.
