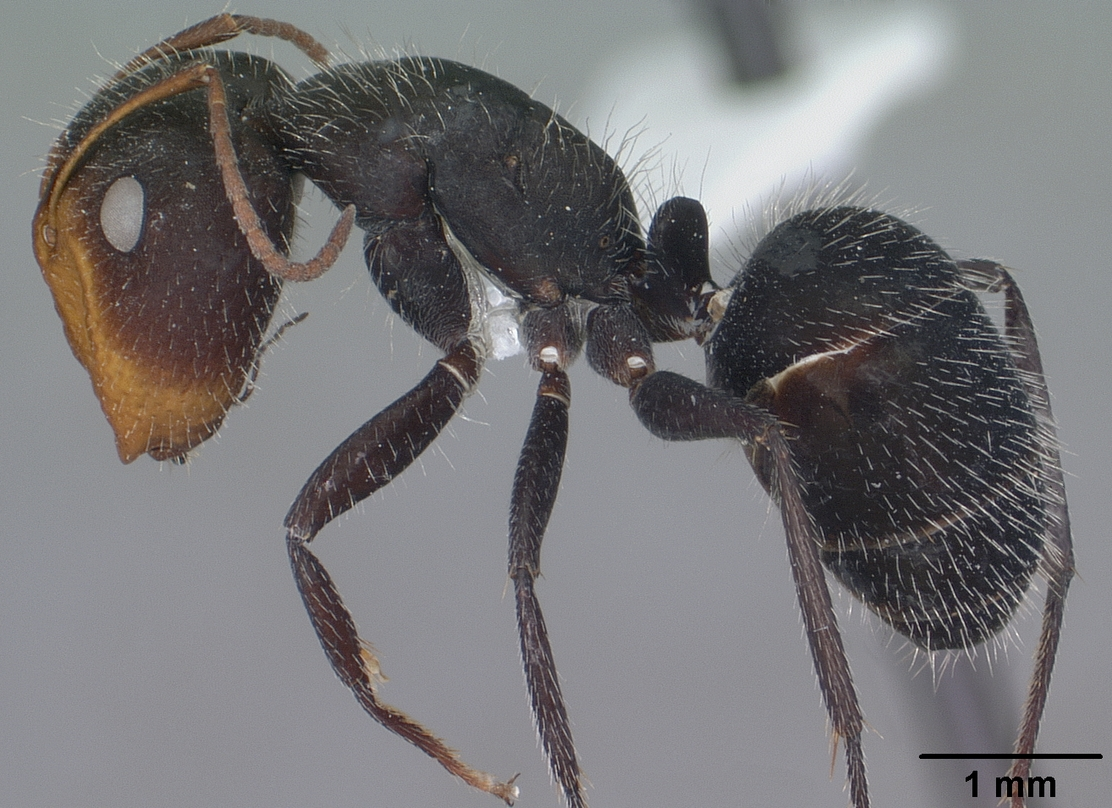

Scientific classification
- Domain: Eukaryota
- Kingdom: Animalia
- Phylum: Arthropoda
- Class: Insecta
- Order: Hymenoptera
- Family: Formicidae
- Subfamily: Formicinae
- Genus: Camponotus
- Subgenus: Hypercolobopsis
- Species: C. ulcerosus

Binomial name
- Camponotus ulcerosus Wheeler, 1910

Synonyms
- Camponotus bruesi Wheeler, 1910

= Camponotus ulcerosus =

Species of ant

Camponotus ulcerosus is a species of carpenter ant native to Mexico, Texas, New Mexico, and Arizona.
