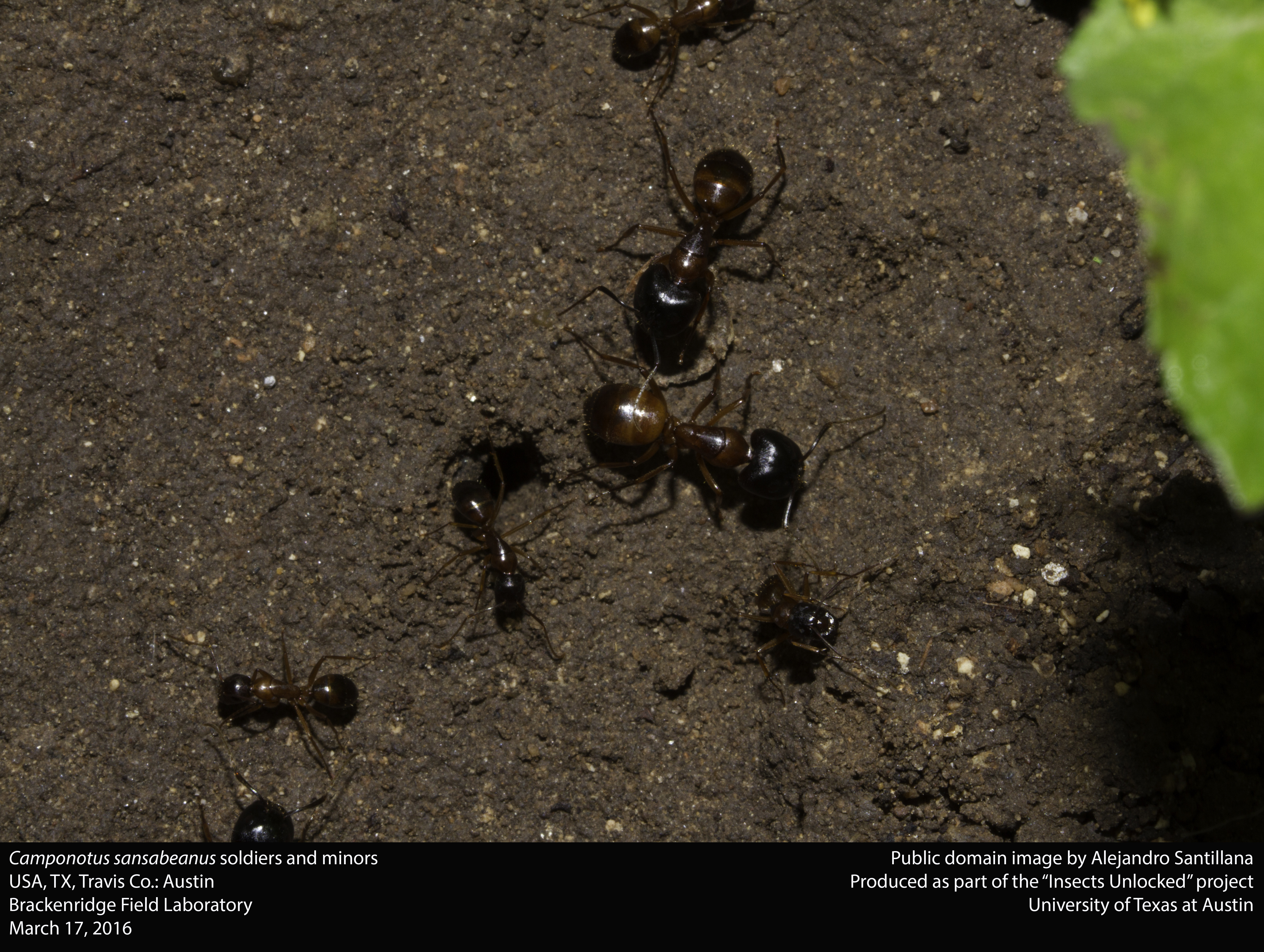

Scientific classification
- Kingdom: Animalia
- Phylum: Arthropoda
- Clade: Pancrustacea
- Class: Insecta
- Order: Hymenoptera
- Family: Formicidae
- Subfamily: Formicinae
- Genus: Camponotus
- Subgenus: Camponotus
- Species: C. sansabeanus

Binomial name
- Camponotus sansabeanus (Buckley, 1866)

= Camponotus sansabeanus =

Species of ant

Camponotus sansabeanus is a species of carpenter ant native to the western United States, northern Mexico, Missouri, Arkansas, and Louisiana.
