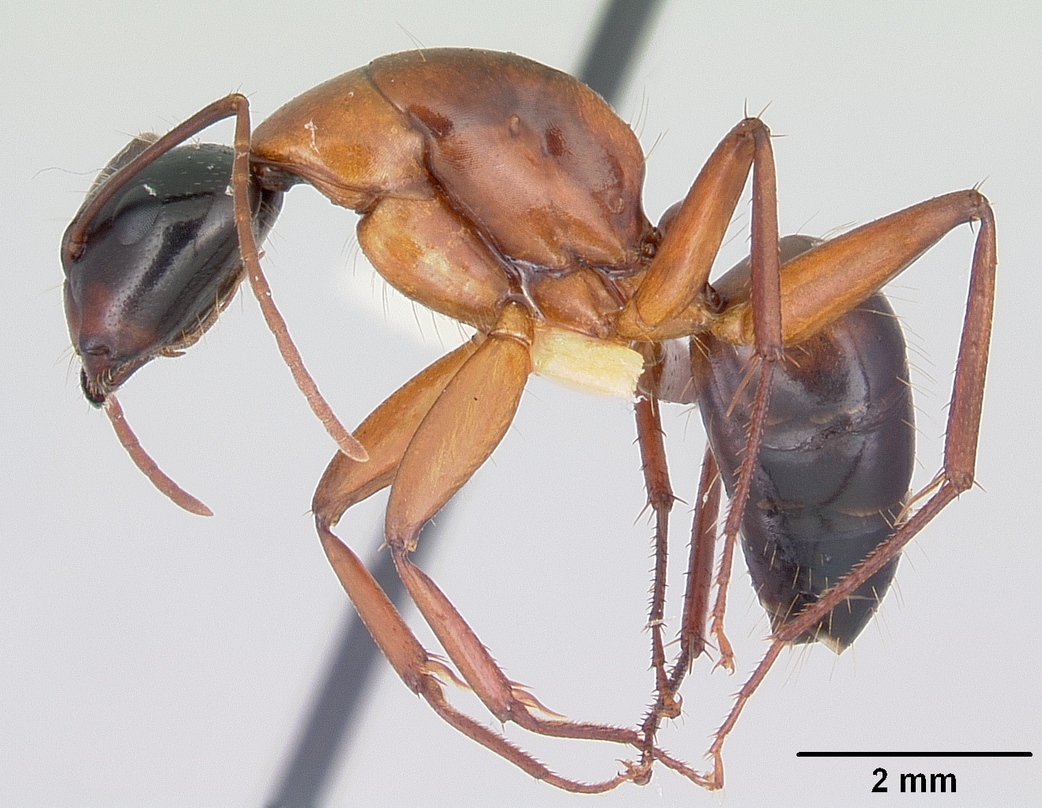

Scientific classification
- Kingdom: Animalia
- Phylum: Arthropoda
- Clade: Pancrustacea
- Class: Insecta
- Order: Hymenoptera
- Family: Formicidae
- Subfamily: Formicinae
- Genus: Camponotus
- Subgenus: Camponotus
- Species: C. texanus

Binomial name
- Camponotus texanus Wheeler, 1903

= Camponotus texanus =

Species of ant

Camponotus texanus is a species of carpenter ant native to Texas, Nuevo Leon, and possibly Arizona.
