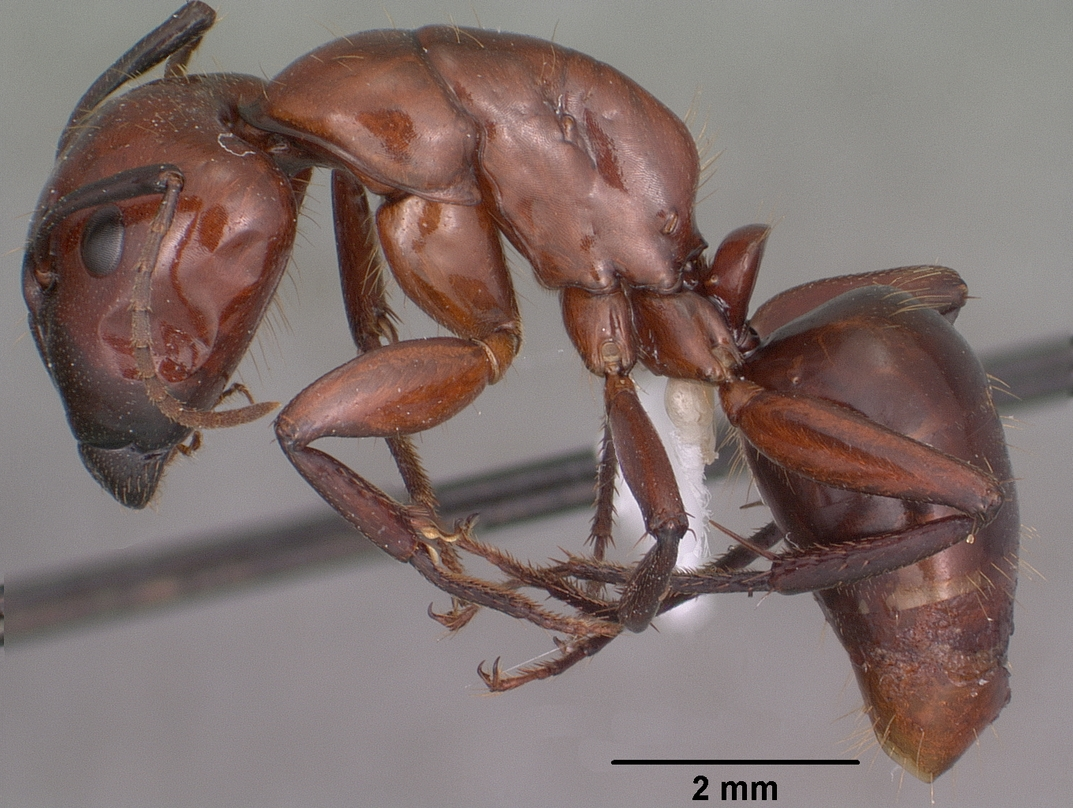

Scientific classification
- Kingdom: Animalia
- Phylum: Arthropoda
- Clade: Pancrustacea
- Class: Insecta
- Order: Hymenoptera
- Family: Formicidae
- Subfamily: Formicinae
- Genus: Camponotus
- Subgenus: Camponotus
- Species: C. schaefferi

Binomial name
- Camponotus schaefferi Wheeler, 1909

= Camponotus schaefferi =

Species of ant

Camponotus schaefferi is a species of carpenter ant native to Arizona, New Mexico, and possibly Venezuela.
