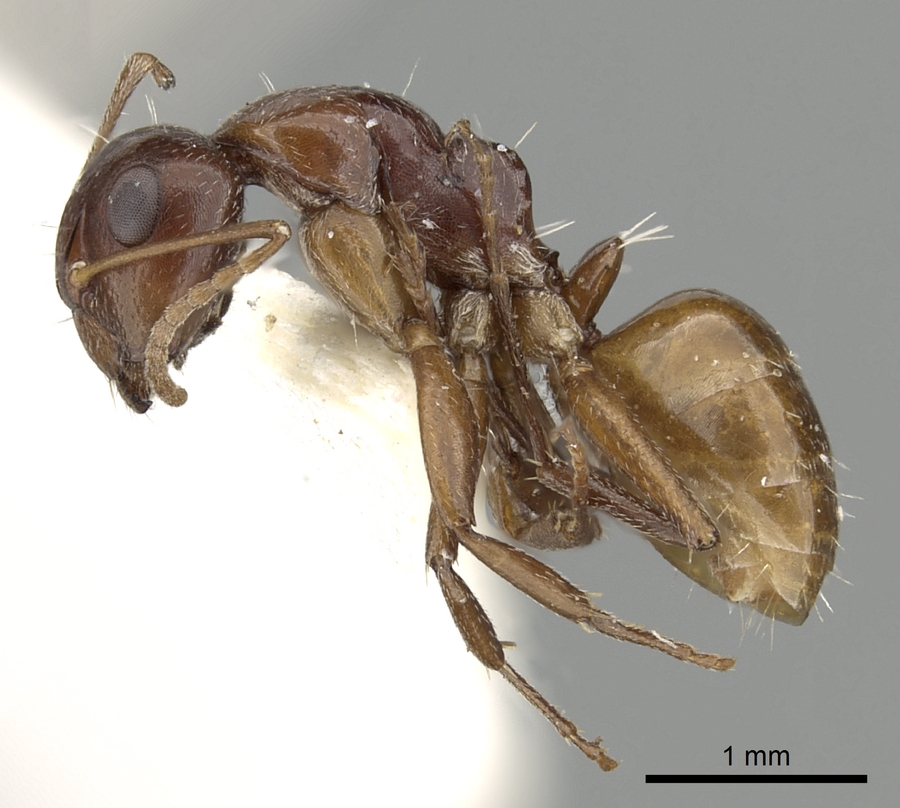

Scientific classification
- Domain: Eukaryota
- Kingdom: Animalia
- Phylum: Arthropoda
- Class: Insecta
- Order: Hymenoptera
- Family: Formicidae
- Subfamily: Formicinae
- Genus: Camponotus
- Subgenus: Myrmotrema
- Species: C. fayfaensis

Binomial name
- Camponotus fayfaensis Collingwood, 1985

= Camponotus fayfaensis =

Species of ant

Camponotus fayfaensis is a species of carpenter ant (genus Camponotus) found in coastal regions of Yemen, Saudi Arabia, and the UAE.
