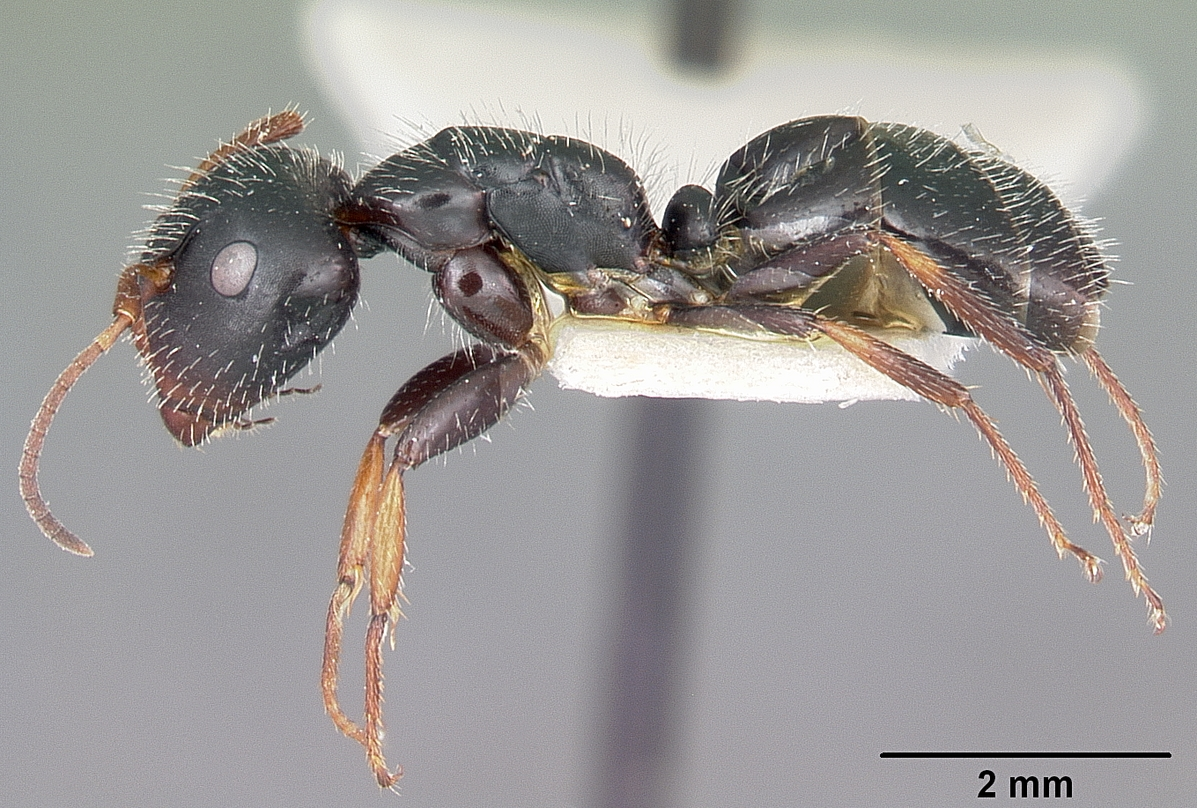

Scientific classification
- Domain: Eukaryota
- Kingdom: Animalia
- Phylum: Arthropoda
- Class: Insecta
- Order: Hymenoptera
- Family: Formicidae
- Subfamily: Formicinae
- Genus: Camponotus
- Subgenus: Myrmobrachys
- Species: C. trepidulus

Binomial name
- Camponotus trepidulus Creighton, 1965

= Camponotus trepidulus =

Species of ant

Camponotus trepidulus is a species of carpenter ant native to Arizona, New Mexico, Baja California, Nayarit, Aguascalientes, and the State of Mexico.
