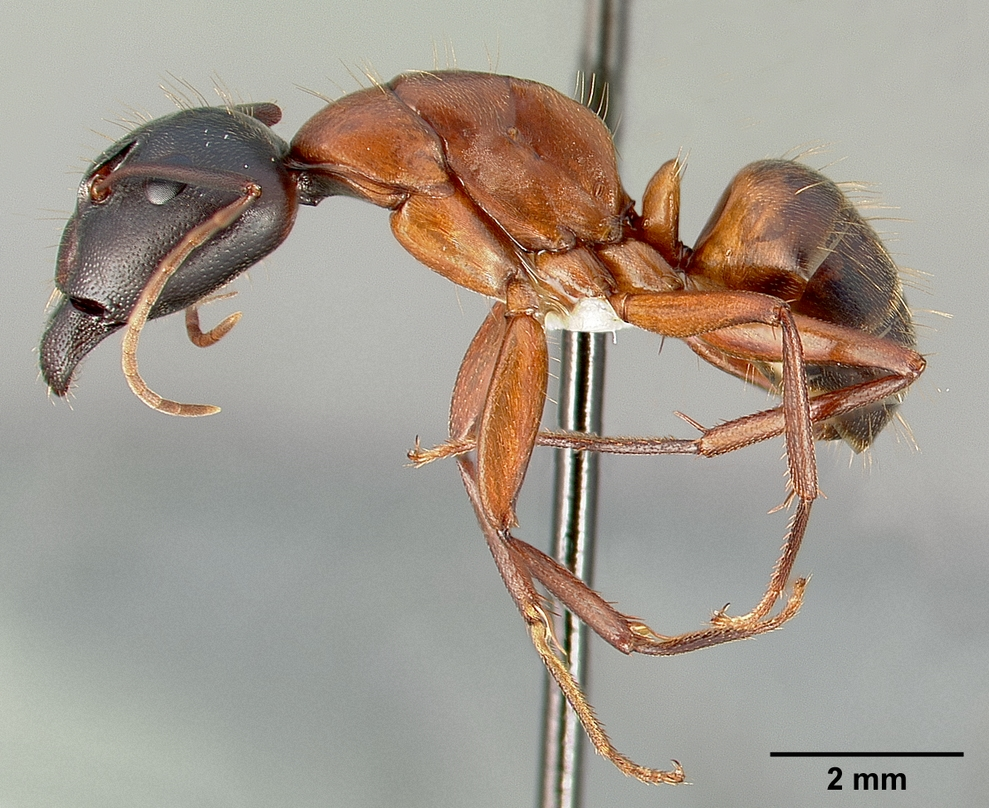

Scientific classification
- Domain: Eukaryota
- Kingdom: Animalia
- Phylum: Arthropoda
- Class: Insecta
- Order: Hymenoptera
- Family: Formicidae
- Subfamily: Formicinae
- Genus: Camponotus
- Subgenus: Tanaemyrmex
- Species: C. semitestaceus

Binomial name
- Camponotus semitestaceus Snelling, 1970

= Camponotus semitestaceus =

Species of ant

Camponotus semitestaceus is a species of carpenter ant native to the western United States, British Columbia, Baja California, and possibly Veracruz.
