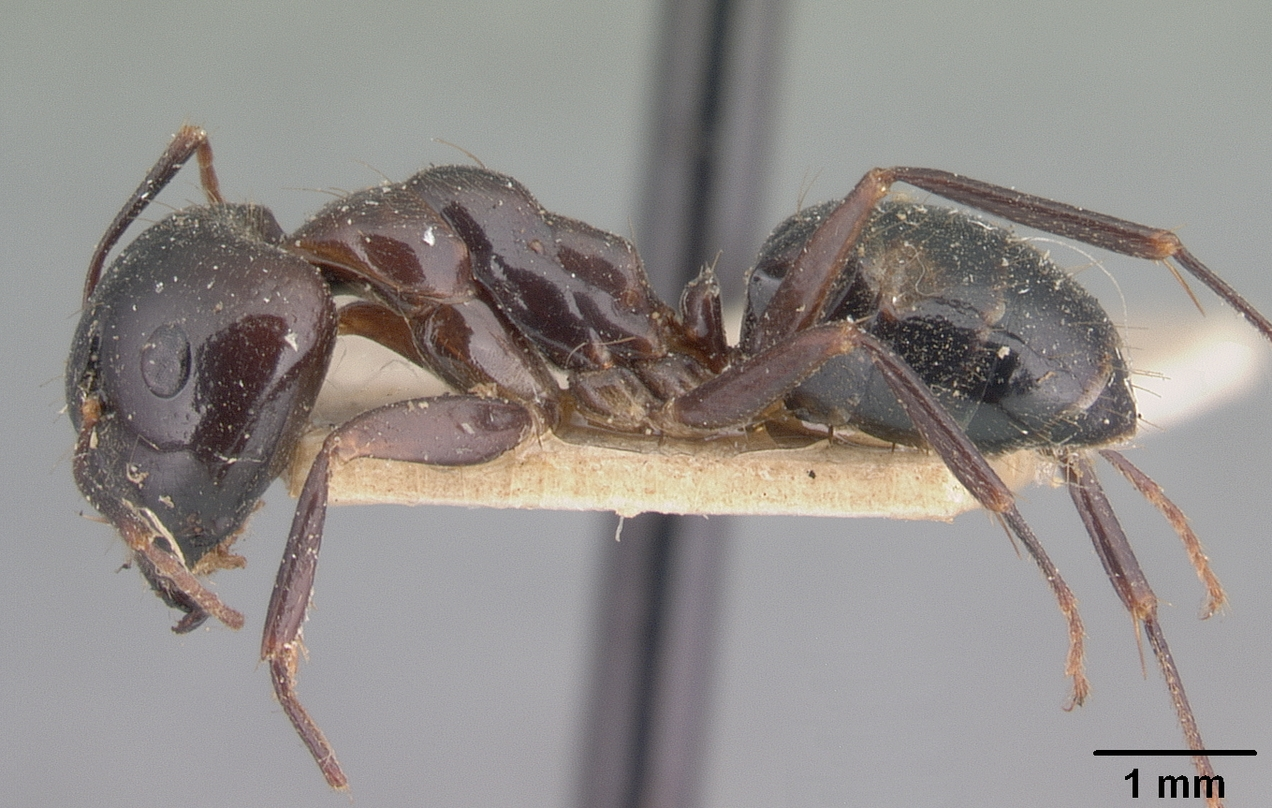

Scientific classification
- Kingdom: Animalia
- Phylum: Arthropoda
- Clade: Pancrustacea
- Class: Insecta
- Order: Hymenoptera
- Family: Formicidae
- Subfamily: Formicinae
- Genus: Camponotus
- Subgenus: Myrmosaga
- Species: C. gibber

Binomial name
- Camponotus gibber Forel, 1891

= Camponotus gibber =

Species of ant

Camponotus gibber is a species of carpenter ant (genus Camponotus) found in Madagascar.
