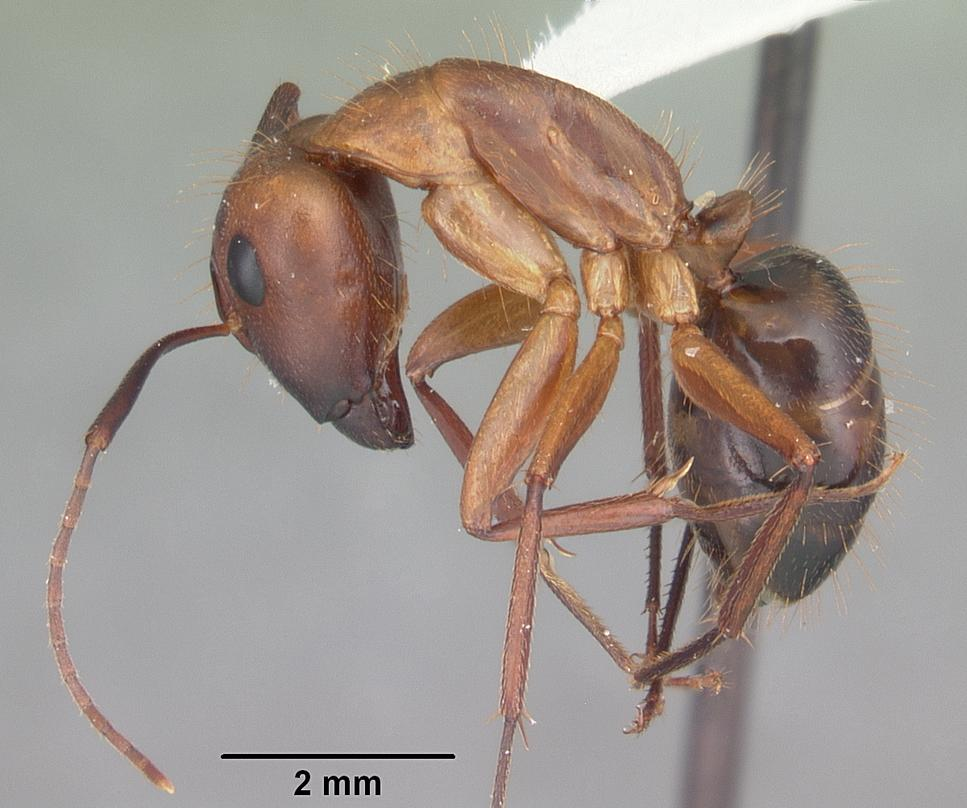

Scientific classification
- Domain: Eukaryota
- Kingdom: Animalia
- Phylum: Arthropoda
- Class: Insecta
- Order: Hymenoptera
- Family: Formicidae
- Subfamily: Formicinae
- Genus: Camponotus
- Subgenus: Tanaemyrmex
- Species: C. inaequalis

Binomial name
- Camponotus inaequalis Roger, 1863

Synonyms
- Camponotus tortuganus Deyrup, 2017; C. conspicuus tortuganus Forel, 1914; C. landolti zonatus var. eburneus Wheeler, 1913

= Camponotus inaequalis =

Species of ant

Camponotus inaequalis is a species of carpenter ant native to Florida, the Bahamas, and Cuba.
