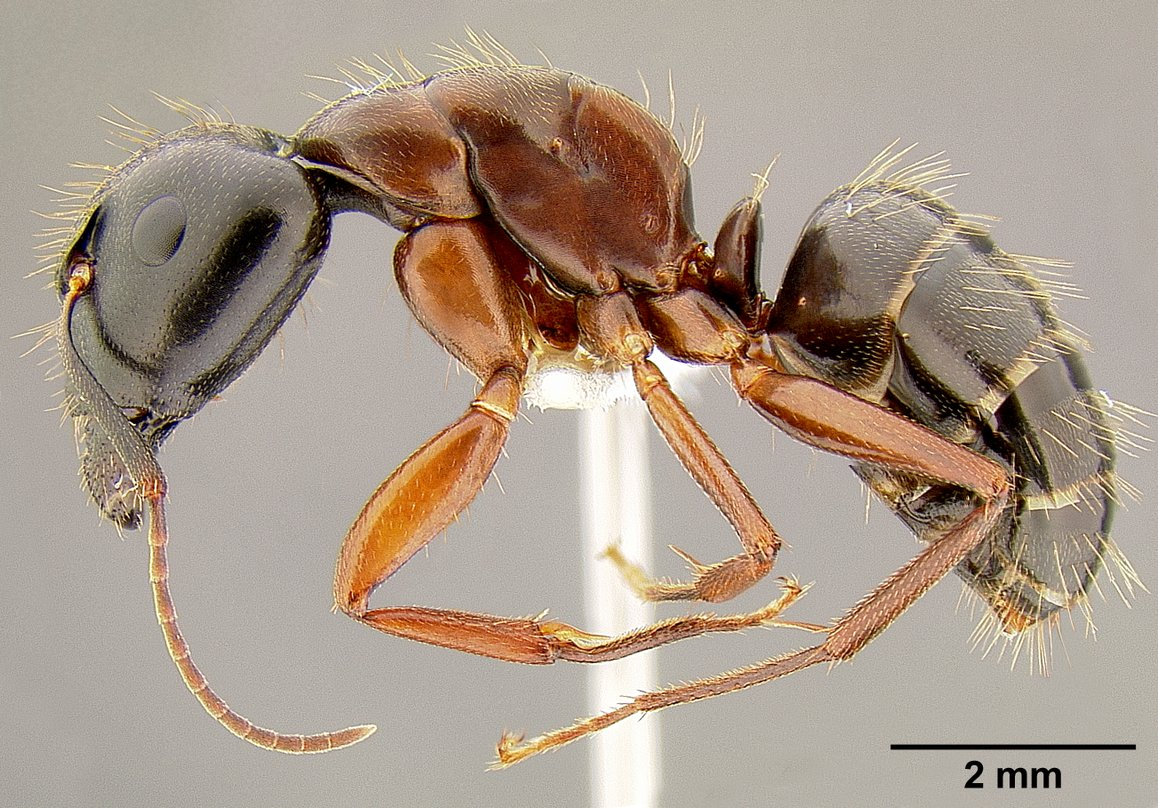

Scientific classification
- Domain: Eukaryota
- Kingdom: Animalia
- Phylum: Arthropoda
- Class: Insecta
- Order: Hymenoptera
- Family: Formicidae
- Subfamily: Formicinae
- Genus: Camponotus
- Subgenus: Tanaemyrmex
- Species: C. maritimus

Binomial name
- Camponotus maritimus Ward, 2005

= Camponotus maritimus =

Species of ant

Camponotus maritimus is a species of carpenter ant native to California.
