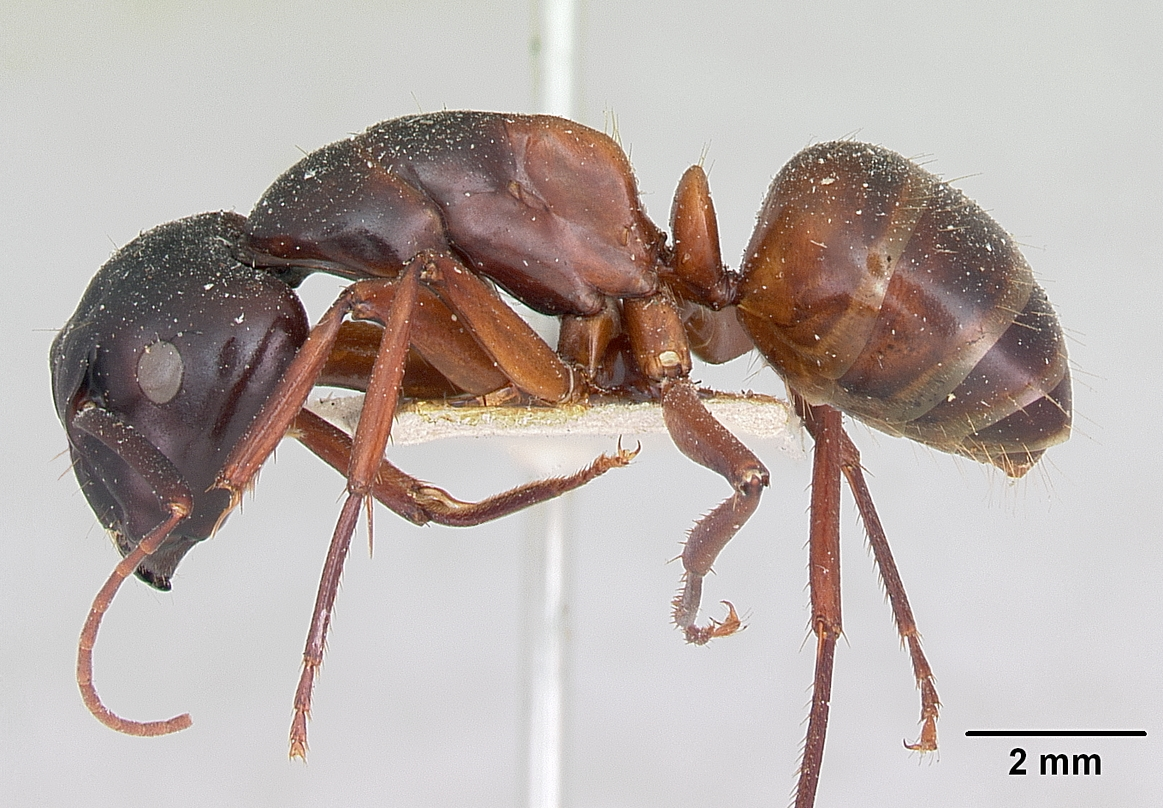

Scientific classification
- Kingdom: Animalia
- Phylum: Arthropoda
- Clade: Pancrustacea
- Class: Insecta
- Order: Hymenoptera
- Family: Formicidae
- Subfamily: Formicinae
- Genus: Camponotus
- Subgenus: Tanaemyrmex
- Species: C. maccooki

Binomial name
- Camponotus maccooki Forel, 1879

Synonyms
- C. sylvaticus maccooki Forel, 1885; C. rubripes maccooki Forel, 1886; C. maculatus maccooki Emery, 1893; C. sansabeanus maccooki Emery, 1920

= Camponotus maccooki =

Species of ant

Camponotus maccooki is a species of carpenter ant native to the western United States, British Columbia, Baja California, and possibly Colorado, Oklahoma, and Texas.
