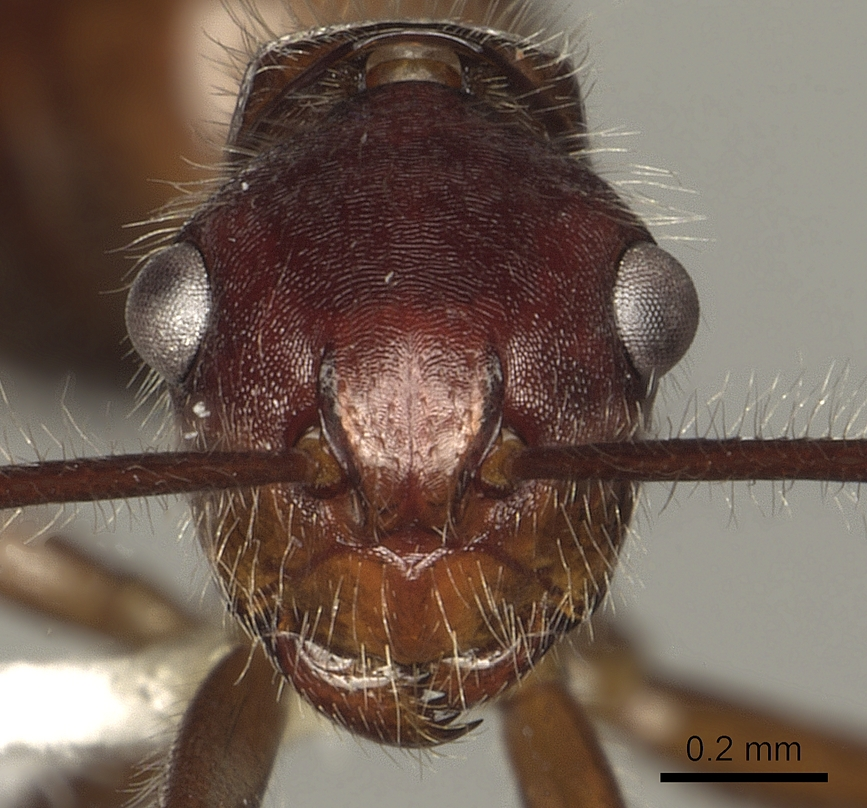
- Camponotus chartifex

Scientific classification
- Kingdom: Animalia
- Phylum: Arthropoda
- Clade: Pancrustacea
- Class: Insecta
- Order: Hymenoptera
- Family: Formicidae
- Subfamily: Formicinae
- Genus: Camponotus
- Subgenus: Dendromyrmex; Emery, 1925

Species
- 6 species

= Camponotus (Dendromyrmex) =

Subgenus of insects

Dendromyrmex is a subgenus of carpenter ants.

== Species ==
- Camponotus apicalis
- Camponotus chartifex
- Camponotus fabricii
- Camponotus madeirensis
- Camponotus nidulans
- Camponotus traili
