= Camponotus bishamon =

Scientific classification
- Kingdom: Animalia
- Phylum: Arthropoda
- Class: Insecta
- Order: Hymenoptera
- Family: Formicidae
- Subfamily: Formicinae
- Genus: Camponotus
- Subgenus: Myrmamblys
- Species: C. bishamon

Binomial name
- Camponotus bishamon Terayama, 1999

Species of Japanese carpenter ant

Camponotus bishamon (ホソウメマツオオアリ, Hoso Umematsu Ōari) is a species of carpenter ant endemic to Japan.

== Description ==
The major workers of this species have a head that is almost as wide as it is long, with subparallel sides and an almost straight posterior margin in full view. The Anterior margin clypeus is slightly convex. The Mandible has five teeth and the eyes are flat. Antenae scrape extends past the posterior margin by about 1/5 of its length.

== Distribution ==
This species of ant is endemic to Japan, and is particularly common around the Nansei Islands.

== Ecology ==
Camponotus bishamon is an arboreal, or tree-dwelling, species of carpenter ant.
