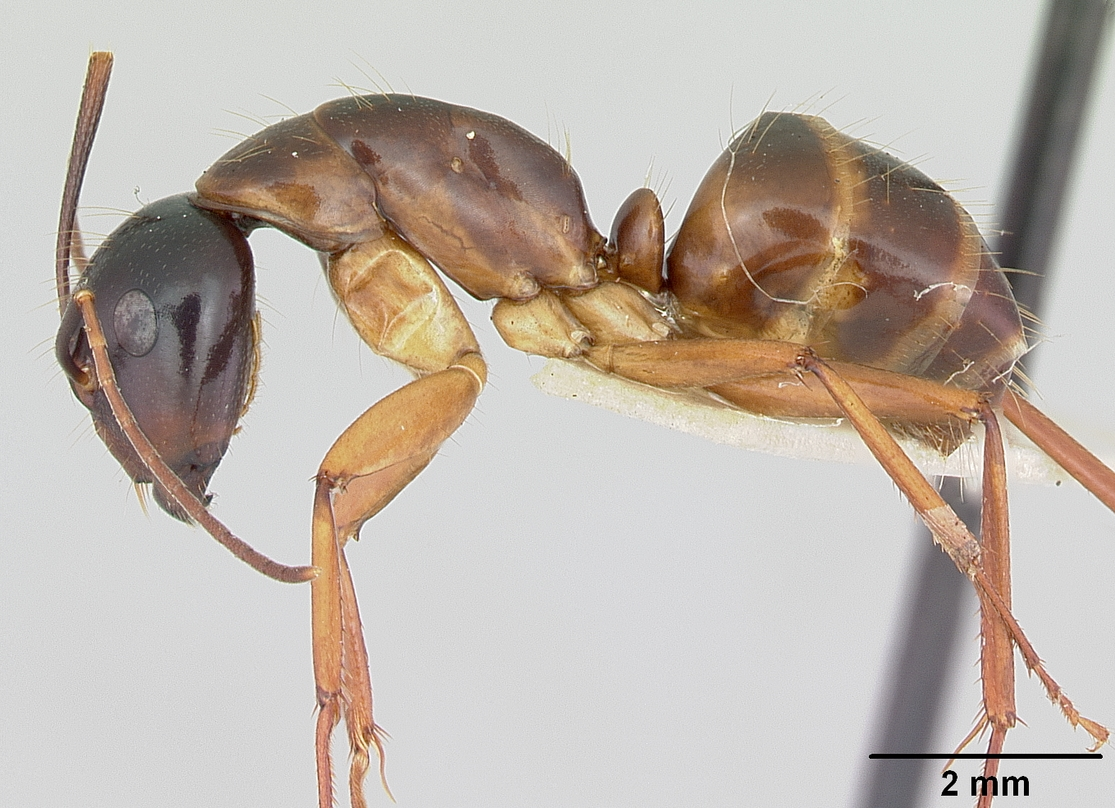
- Camponotus americanus worker

Scientific classification
- Domain: Eukaryota
- Kingdom: Animalia
- Phylum: Arthropoda
- Class: Insecta
- Order: Hymenoptera
- Family: Formicidae
- Subfamily: Formicinae
- Genus: Camponotus
- Subgenus: Camponotus
- Species: C. americanus

Binomial name
- Camponotus americanus Mayr, 1862

= Camponotus americanus =

Species of carpenter ant

Camponotus americanus is a species of carpenter ant. The ant is above average in length with worker ants being 7–10 mm (0.28–0.39 in) long. Despite normally nesting in soil, it is known that the species may nest under stones, under litter, or in rotten logs.
