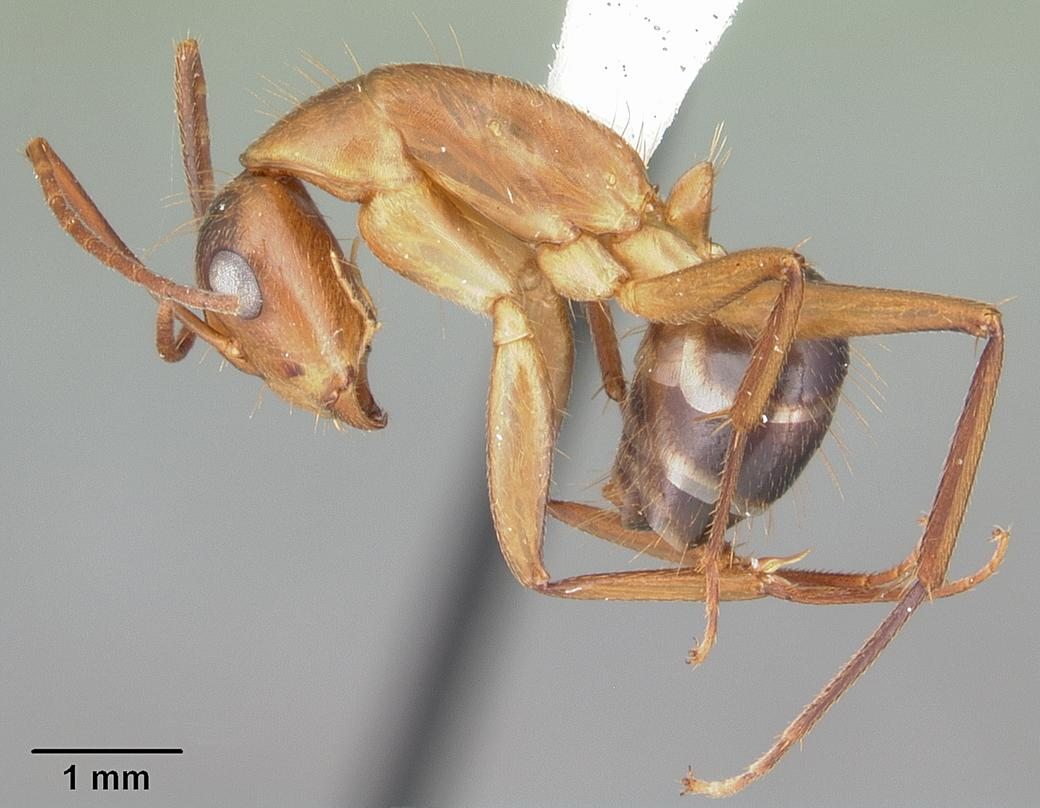

Scientific classification
- Domain: Eukaryota
- Kingdom: Animalia
- Phylum: Arthropoda
- Class: Insecta
- Order: Hymenoptera
- Family: Formicidae
- Subfamily: Formicinae
- Genus: Camponotus
- Species: C. tortuganus

Binomial name
- Camponotus tortuganus Emery, 1895

= Camponotus tortuganus =

Species of carpenter ant

Camponotus tortuganus is a species of ant in the family Formicidae.
