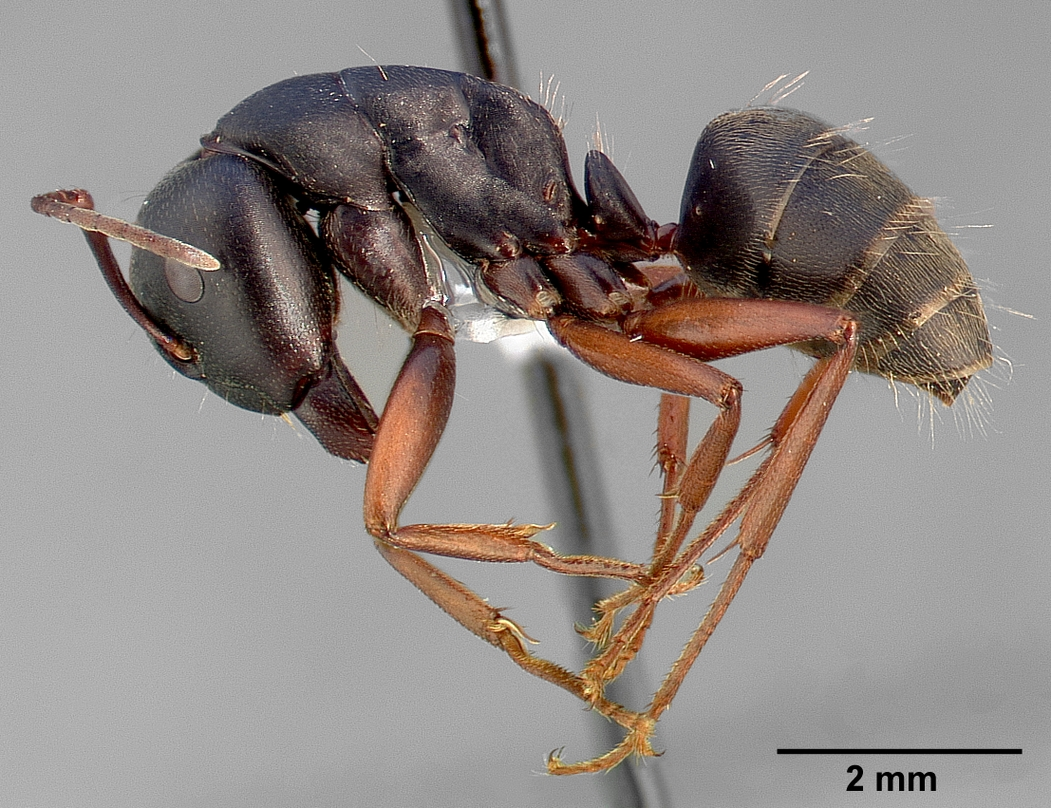
- Camponotus modoc worker

Scientific classification
- Kingdom: Animalia
- Phylum: Arthropoda
- Clade: Pancrustacea
- Class: Insecta
- Order: Hymenoptera
- Family: Formicidae
- Subfamily: Formicinae
- Genus: Camponotus
- Subgenus: Camponotus
- Species: C. modoc

Binomial name
- Camponotus modoc Wheeler, W. M., 1910

= Camponotus modoc =

Western carpenter ant

Camponotus modoc or western black carpenter ant is a black carpenter ant with dark red legs. Workers range in size from 7 to 13 mm (0.28 to 0.51 in).

== Habitat ==
It occurs in Western North America, where it makes nests in dead wood, including dead logs in the forests, as well as human houses.

== As pests ==
Carpenter ants will damage homes by nesting in them. They will dig out tunnels in wood to expand their living spaces which can lead to structural damage. The infestation in the home usually is a satellite colony, with the main one within a hundred yards or more in a stump or other decayed wood. When colonies start to establish themselves in homes, they may start small (a few hundred members) but can grow to several tens of thousands. There can be 20 or more satellite colonies.
