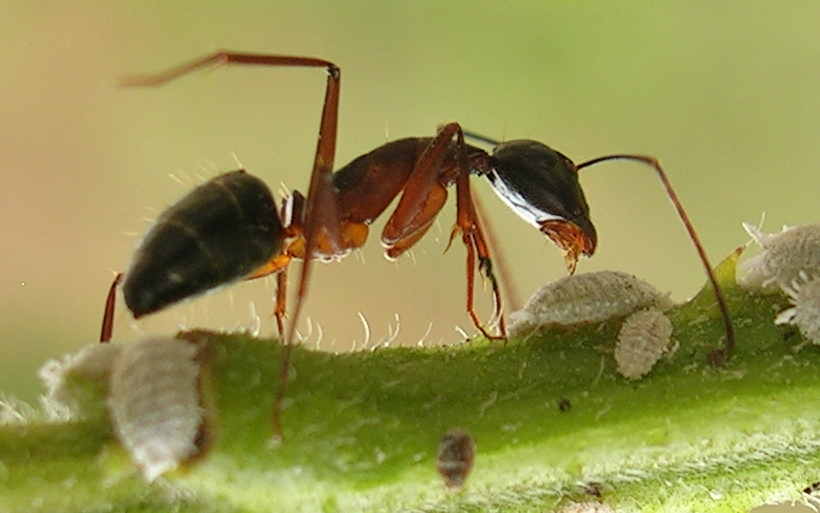
- Camponotus compressus tending soft scale insects

Scientific classification
- Kingdom: Animalia
- Phylum: Arthropoda
- Clade: Pancrustacea
- Class: Insecta
- Order: Hymenoptera
- Family: Formicidae
- Subfamily: Formicinae
- Genus: Camponotus
- Subgenus: Tanaemyrmex
- Species: C. compressus

Binomial name
- Camponotus compressus (Fabricius, 1787)

= Camponotus compressus =

Species of Asian carpenter ant

Camponotus compressus, sometimes known as the Indian black ant, is a type of ground-nesting species of ant found in India and Southeast Asia. It is a frequent visitor to toilets as it consumes urea. It is one of the many species which tends plant-sap-sucking insects like aphids and tree hoppers. They add nutrients into the soil through their discarded waste piles These ants stroke their antenna on the hind parts of these insects stimulating them to excrete a sugar rich liquid, called honeydew, which the ants consume. In return, they are known to protect the insects from predators like ladybugs. These ants range from red to black and some times appear slightly yellow in colour. It is known to be the main food of the Indian pangolin.
