= Camponotus triodiae =

Scientific classification
- Kingdom: Animalia
- Phylum: Arthropoda
- Class: Insecta
- Order: Hymenoptera
- Family: Formicidae
- Subfamily: Formicinae
- Genus: Camponotus
- Species: C. triodiae

Binomial name
- Camponotus triodiae A. J. McArthur, 2009

Species of carpenter ant

Camponotus triodiae is a species of ant found in Australia, originally discovered in northern South Australia. The ants' nests have a distinctive entrance created from a combination of a long tube of spinifex grass and red outback soil.
