= Camponotus monju =

Scientific classification
- Kingdom: Animalia
- Phylum: Arthropoda
- Class: Insecta
- Order: Hymenoptera
- Family: Formicidae
- Subfamily: Formicinae
- Genus: Camponotus
- Subgenus: Tanaemyrmex
- Species: C. monju

Binomial name
- Camponotus monju Terayama, 1999

Species of Asian carpenter ant

Camponotus monju is a species of carpenter ant known from Japan and Taiwan.
