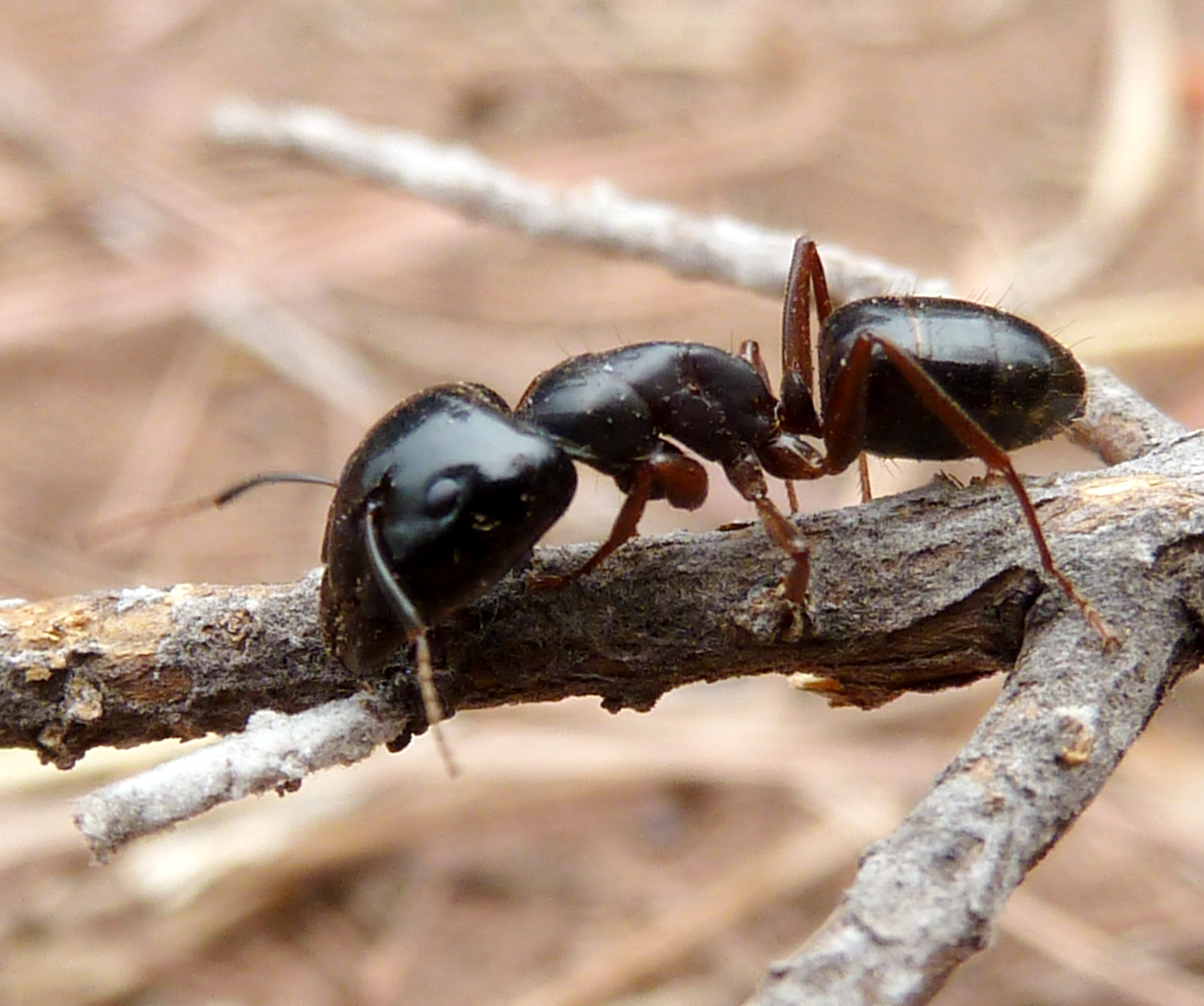

Scientific classification
- Kingdom: Animalia
- Phylum: Arthropoda
- Clade: Pancrustacea
- Class: Insecta
- Order: Hymenoptera
- Family: Formicidae
- Subfamily: Formicinae
- Genus: Camponotus
- Subgenus: Tanaemyrmex
- Species: C. empedocles

Binomial name
- Camponotus empedocles Emery, 1920

Synonyms
- C. maculatus r. thales var. empedocles Forel, 1913; C. thales var. empedocles Emery, 1920; C. maculatus ssp. empedocles Arnold, 1922

= Camponotus empedocles =

Species of carpenter ant

Camponotus empedocles is a large and dark species of carpenter ant with an extensive range in the Afrotropics.

== Range ==
It is native to the Afrotropics and is known to occur in the United Arab Emirates, Yemen, Zimbabwe (type locality) and South Africa.

== Description ==
It is one of the larger, black carpenter ant species of the Afrotropics, with a head width of 3.3 to 3.4 mm. As with other carpenter ants, they have 12 segmented antennae with the antennal insertions distant from the clypeal margin, a rounded pronotum without teeth anteriorly and the petiole entire.

It is uniformly blackish brown with paler legs, and the alitrunk has a continuous, uninterrupted outline. The shiny, uniformly coloured gaster has sparse pubescence, while the duller body is somewhat sculptured. The gula (or medioventral head sclerite) has hairs, but the occiput (back of head) is nearly hairless. The hind tibiae are channeled with a few spiny hairs on the flexor (or inner) surface, with short decumbent (or upward flexing) pubescence evenly covering the whole appendage.
