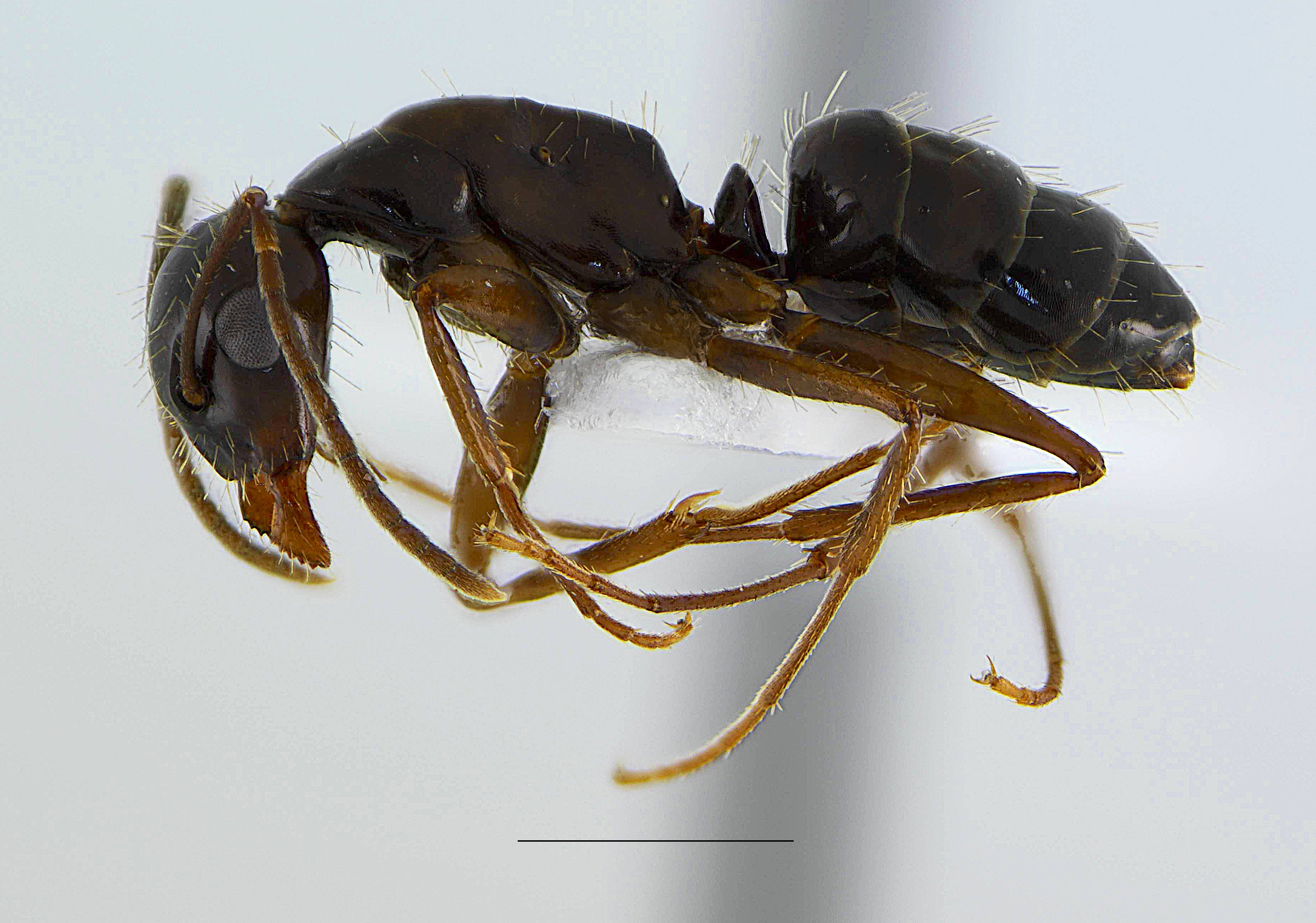
- Camponotus universitatis

Conservation status
- Vulnerable (IUCN 2.3)

Scientific classification
- Kingdom: Animalia
- Phylum: Arthropoda
- Clade: Pancrustacea
- Class: Insecta
- Order: Hymenoptera
- Family: Formicidae
- Subfamily: Formicinae
- Genus: Camponotus
- Subgenus: Tanaemyrmex
- Species: C. universitatis

Binomial name
- Camponotus universitatis Forel, 1890

= Camponotus universitatis =

Species of carpenter ant

Camponotus universitatis is a species of ant in the genus Camponotus, the carpenter ants. It is native to Eurasia, where it has been recorded in Spain, France, Italy, Switzerland, Albania, Bulgaria, and Turkey.

This species is a parasite of other carpenter ants, such as Camponotus aethiops and Camponotus pilicornis.
