= Camponotus daitoensis =

Scientific classification
- Domain: Eukaryota
- Kingdom: Animalia
- Phylum: Arthropoda
- Class: Insecta
- Order: Hymenoptera
- Family: Formicidae
- Subfamily: Formicinae
- Genus: Camponotus
- Subgenus: Myrmamblys
- Species: C. daitoensis

Binomial name
- Camponotus daitoensis Terayama, 1999

Species of carpenter ant

Camponotus daitoensis (ダイトウオオアリ, Daitō Ōari) is a species of carpenter ant, endemic to the Daitō Islands, Japan. The species make nests in trees.
