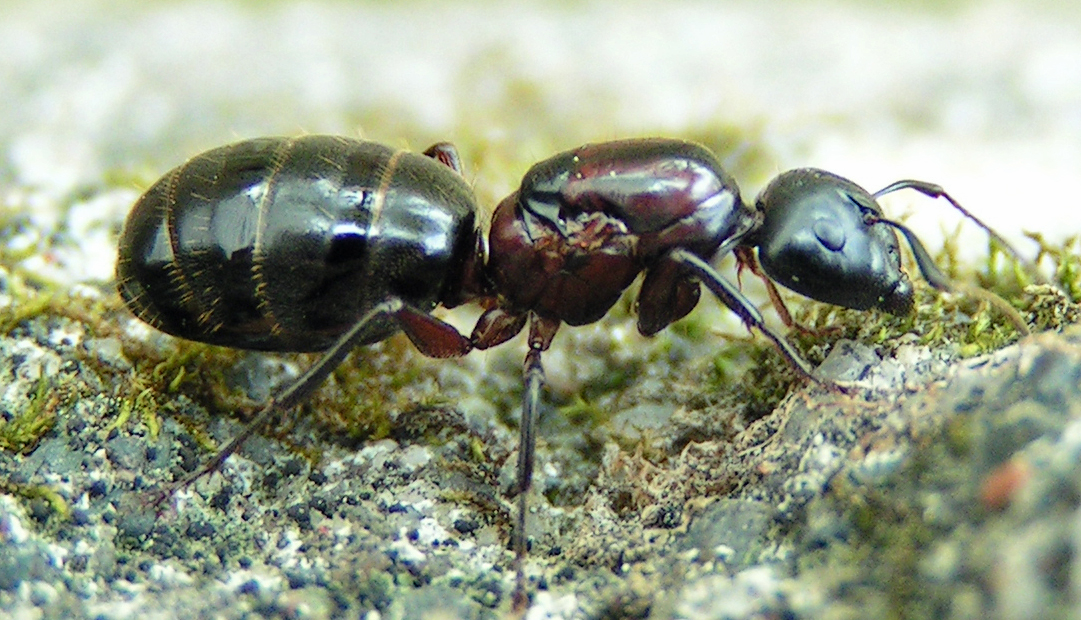

Scientific classification
- Kingdom: Animalia
- Phylum: Arthropoda
- Class: Insecta
- Order: Hymenoptera
- Family: Formicidae
- Subfamily: Formicinae
- Genus: Camponotus
- Subgenus: Camponotus
- Species: C. novaeboracensis

Binomial name
- Camponotus novaeboracensis (Fitch, 1855)

Synonyms
- Formica novaeboracensis Fitch, 1855

= Camponotus novaeboracensis =

New York carpenter ant

Camponotus novaeboracensis, the New York carpenter ant, is a species of carpenter ant native to the United States, Canada, possibly found in Costa Rica, Malaysia, and invasive in Bermuda.

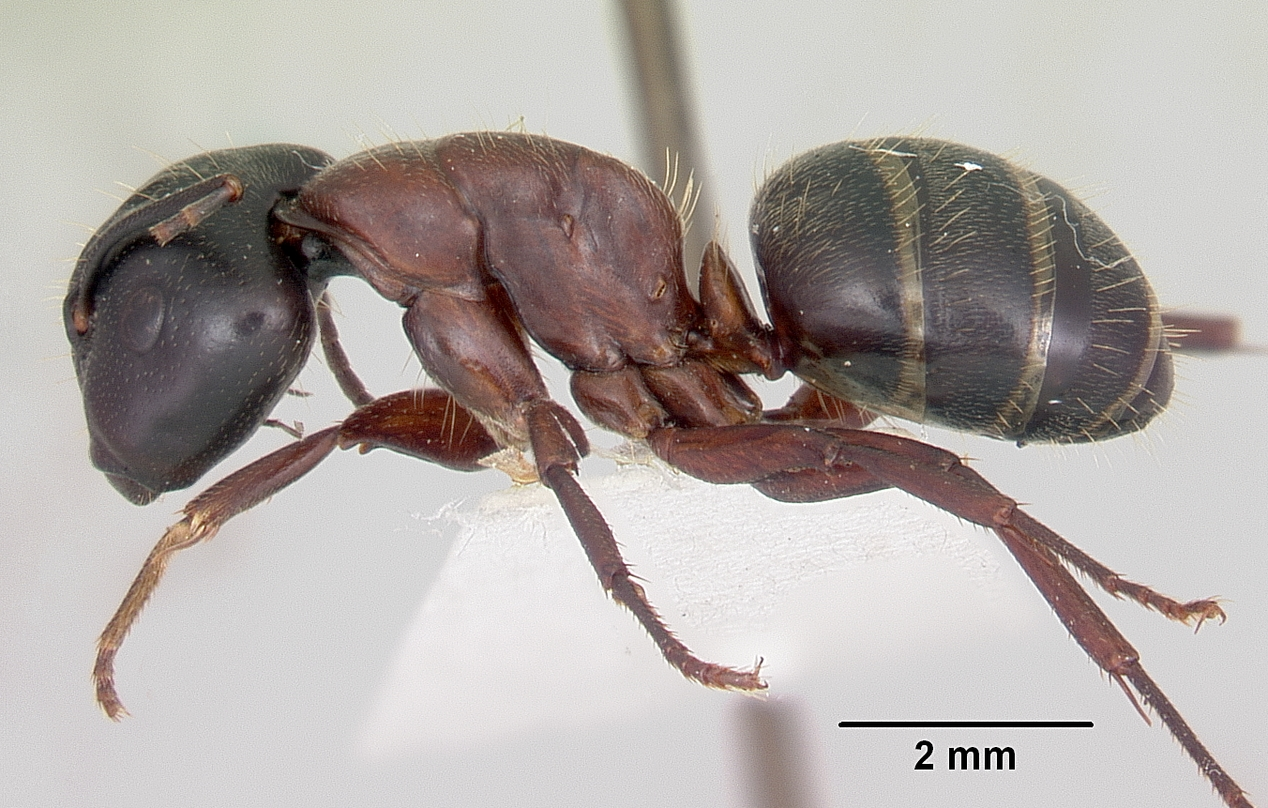
C. novaeboracensis antweb.org specimen
