= Manniella (subgenus) =

Scientific classification
- Kingdom: Animalia
- Phylum: Arthropoda
- Class: Insecta
- Order: Hymenoptera
- Family: Formicidae
- Subfamily: Formicinae
- Genus: Camponotus
- Subgenus: Manniella; Wheeler, W.M., 1921

Species
- See text

Subgenus of insects

Manniella, or Mann's carpenter ants, is a subgenus of Camponotus, the carpenter ants.

== Species ==
- Camponotus micrositus
- Camponotus sphaericus
