= Camponotus silvestrii =

Scientific classification
- Domain: Eukaryota
- Kingdom: Animalia
- Phylum: Arthropoda
- Class: Insecta
- Order: Hymenoptera
- Family: Formicidae
- Subfamily: Formicinae
- Genus: Camponotus
- Subgenus: Myrmaphaenus
- Species: C. silvestrii

Binomial name
- Camponotus silvestrii Emery, 1906

Species of carpenter ant

Camponotus silvestrii is a species of carpenter ant in the genus Camponotus native to northern Brazil.
