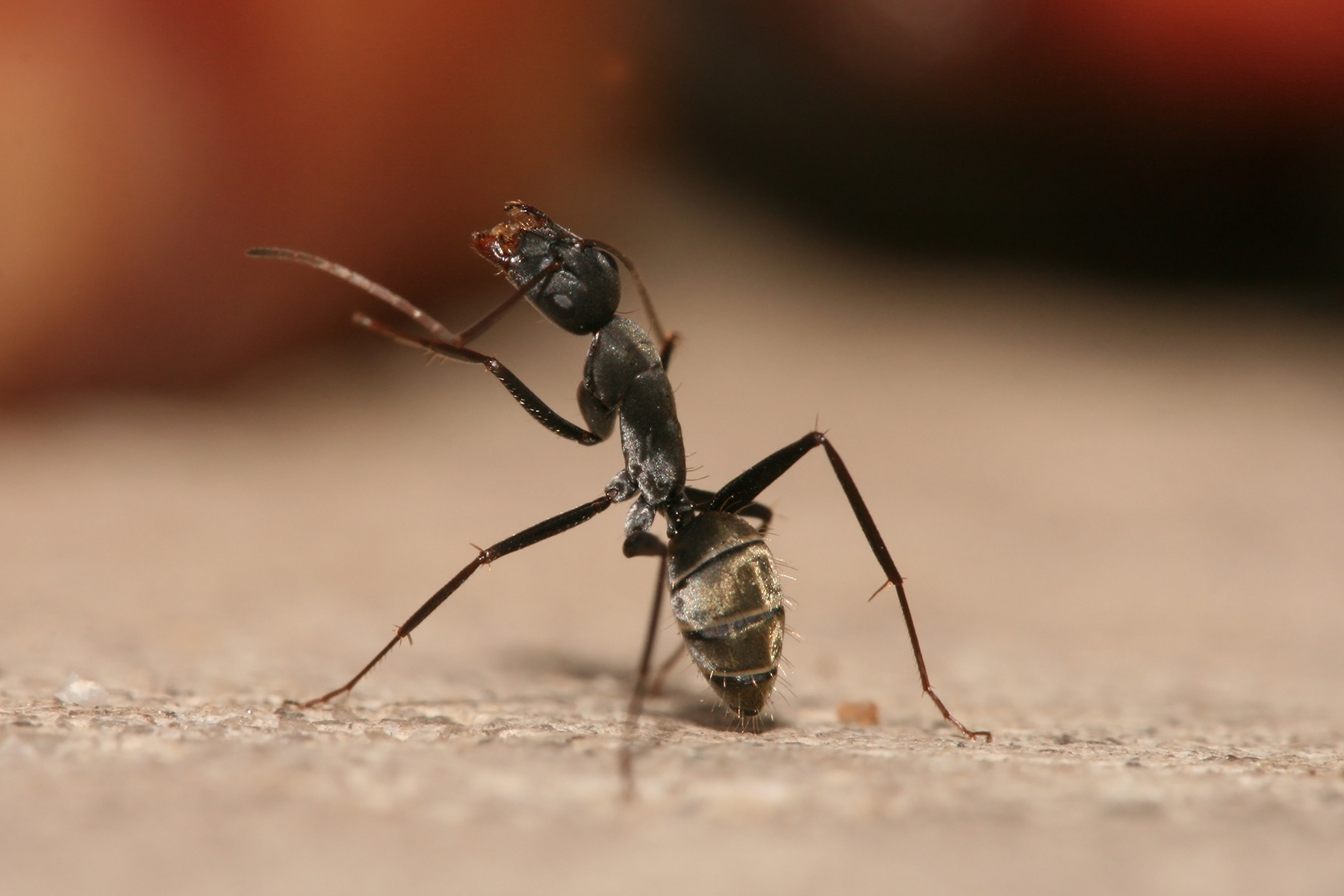

Scientific classification
- Domain: Eukaryota
- Kingdom: Animalia
- Phylum: Arthropoda
- Class: Insecta
- Order: Hymenoptera
- Family: Formicidae
- Subfamily: Formicinae
- Genus: Camponotus
- Subgenus: Myrmosericus
- Species: C. flavomarginatus

Binomial name
- Camponotus flavomarginatus (Mayr, 1862)

= Camponotus flavomarginatus =

Species of carpenter ant

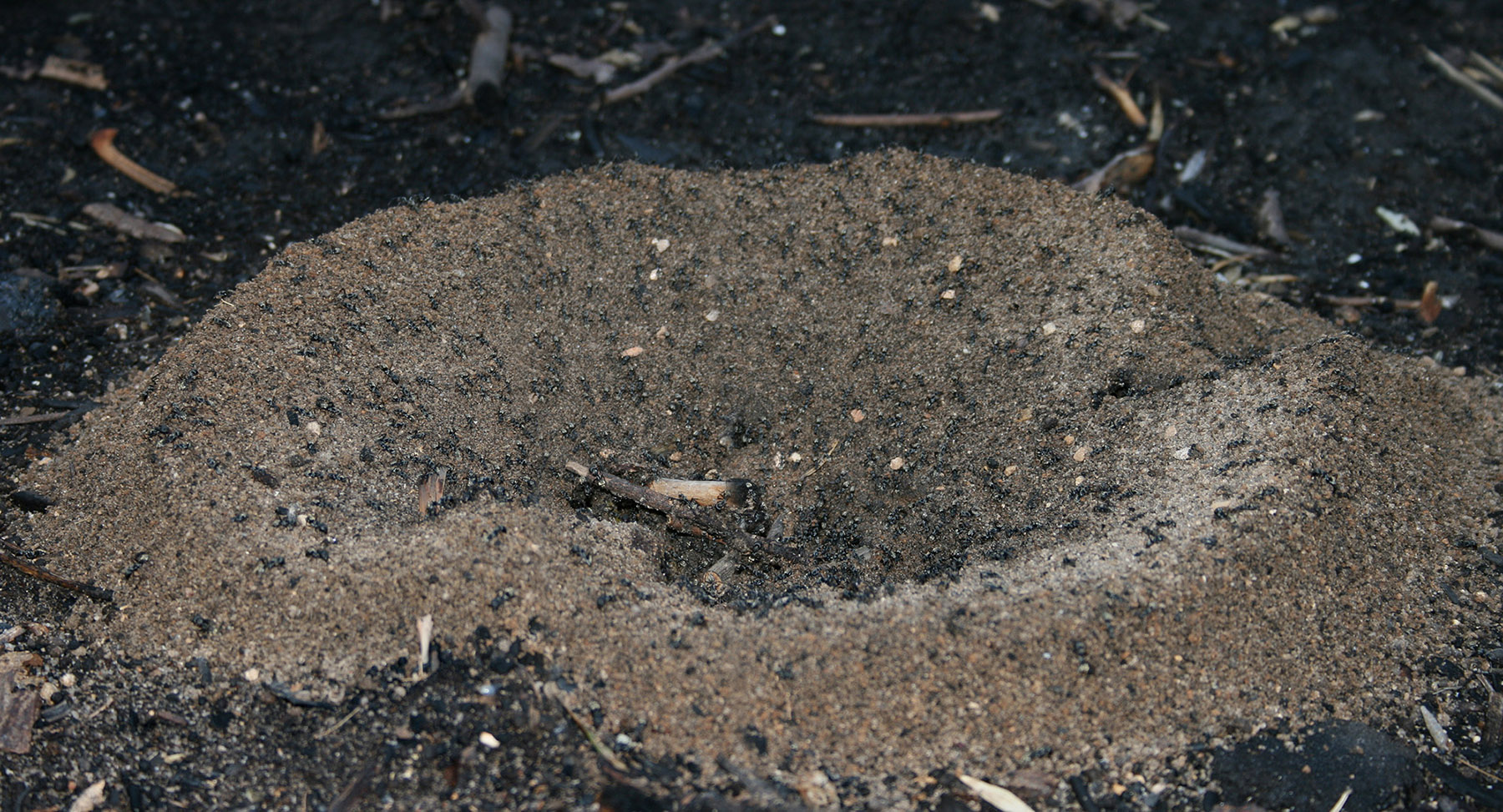
Burrow of the ants

Camponotus flavomarginatus is a black coloured ant with coarse erect hairs on the abdomen. It is fairly common especially on isolated ground where it nests in the soil. It forages widely across the ground and on native herbaceous vegetation. It is found in Africa, particularly in Cameroon.
