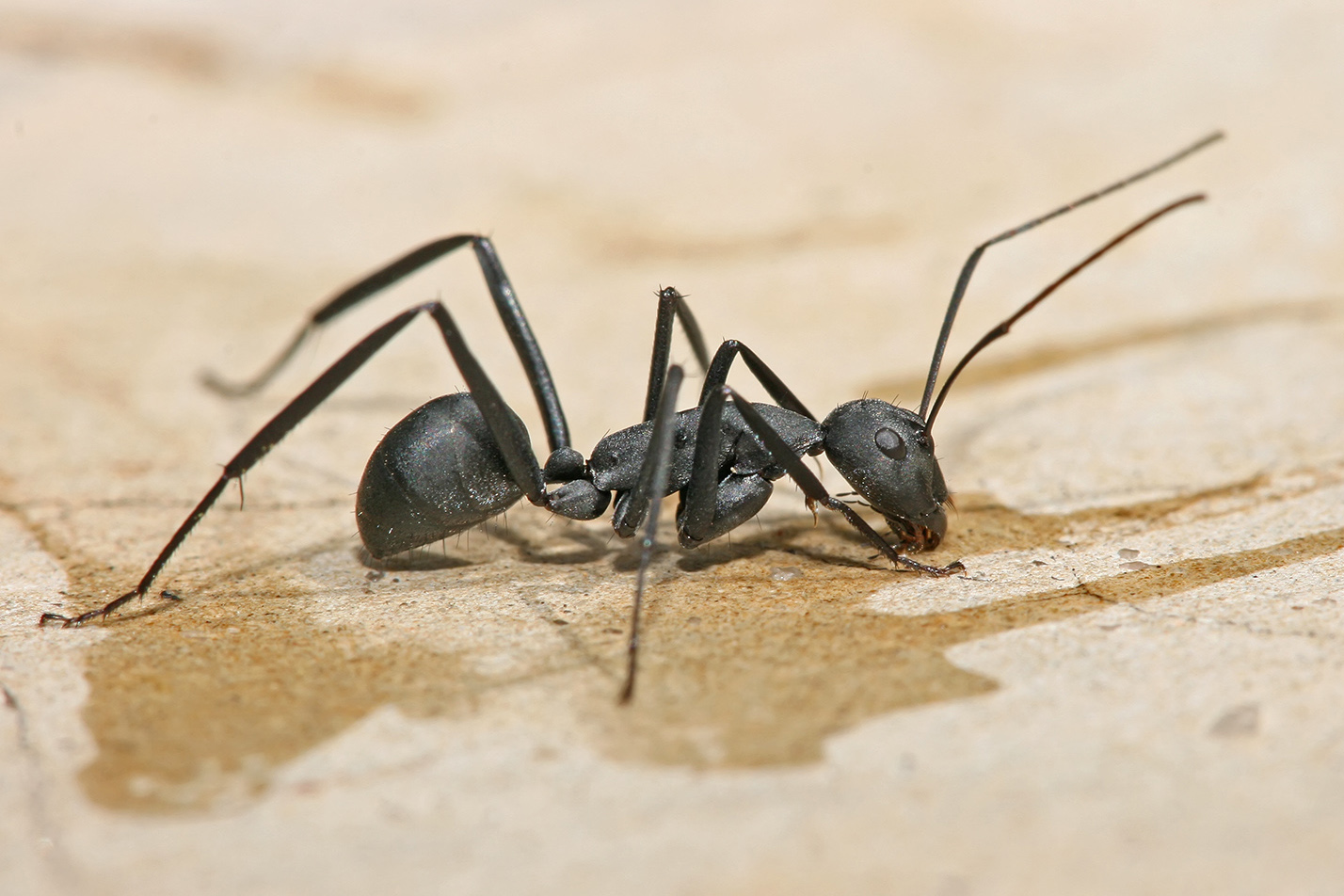
- Camponotus cf. eugeniae (minor worker)

Scientific classification
- Kingdom: Animalia
- Phylum: Arthropoda
- Clade: Pancrustacea
- Class: Insecta
- Order: Hymenoptera
- Family: Formicidae
- Subfamily: Formicinae
- Tribe: Camponotini
- Genus: Camponotus; Mayr, 1861

Type species
- Formica ligniperda Latreille, 1802

Diversity
- 1101 species

Synonyms
- Condylomyrma Santschi, 1928; Dolophra Wu, J. & Wang, 1994; Myrmocamelus Forel, 1914; Myrmolophus Emery, 1920; Myrmoturba Forel, 1912; Neocolobopsis Borgmeier, 1928; Neomyrmamblys Wheeler, W.M., 1921; Orthonotus Ashmead, 1905; Paleosminthurus Pierce & Gibron, 1962; Paracolobopsis Emery, 1920; Shanwangella Zhang, J., 1989

= Carpenter ant =

Carpenter ant Temporal range: Eocene – Recent 52.2–0 Ma

Genus of ants (Camponotus sp.)

Camponotus, the carpenter ants, are a genus of ants in the subfamily Formicinae found nearly worldwide except in Antarctica and a few islands. This genus is the most species-rich genus of ants in terms of described species, comprising over 1,500 described species as of 2025. Although they are commonly referred to as carpenter ants, only a few members, mostly in the subgenera Camponotus (this page) and Myrmentoma, nest in wood.

True carpenter ants build nests inside wood, consisting of galleries chewed out with their mandibles or jaws, preferably in dead, damp wood. However, unlike termites, they do not consume wood, but instead discard a material that resembles sawdust outside their nest. Sometimes, carpenter ants hollow out sections of trees. They also commonly infest wooden buildings and structures, causing a widespread problem: they are a major cause of structural damage. Nevertheless, their ability to excavate wood helps in forest decomposition. The genus includes over 1,000 species. They also farm aphids. In their farming, the ants protect the aphids from predators (usually other insects) while they excrete a sugary fluid called honeydew, which the ants get by stroking the aphids with their antennae.

== Description ==
Carpenter ants are generally large ants: workers are usually 4–7 mm long in small species and 7–13 mm in large species, queens are 9–20 mm long and males are 5–13 mm long. The bases of the antennae are separated from the clypeal border by a distance of at least the antennal scape's maximum diameter. The mesosoma in profile usually forms a continuous curve from the pronotum through to the propodeum.

== Phylogeny ==
For a period, Colobopsis (including the "exploding ants" in the Colobopsis cylindrica group) was considered a subgenus of Camponotus. A 2015 phylogenomic study found it to be the sister group to all the remaining Camponotini. Consequently, since 2016, Colobopsis has been treated as a separate genus again.

== Habitat ==
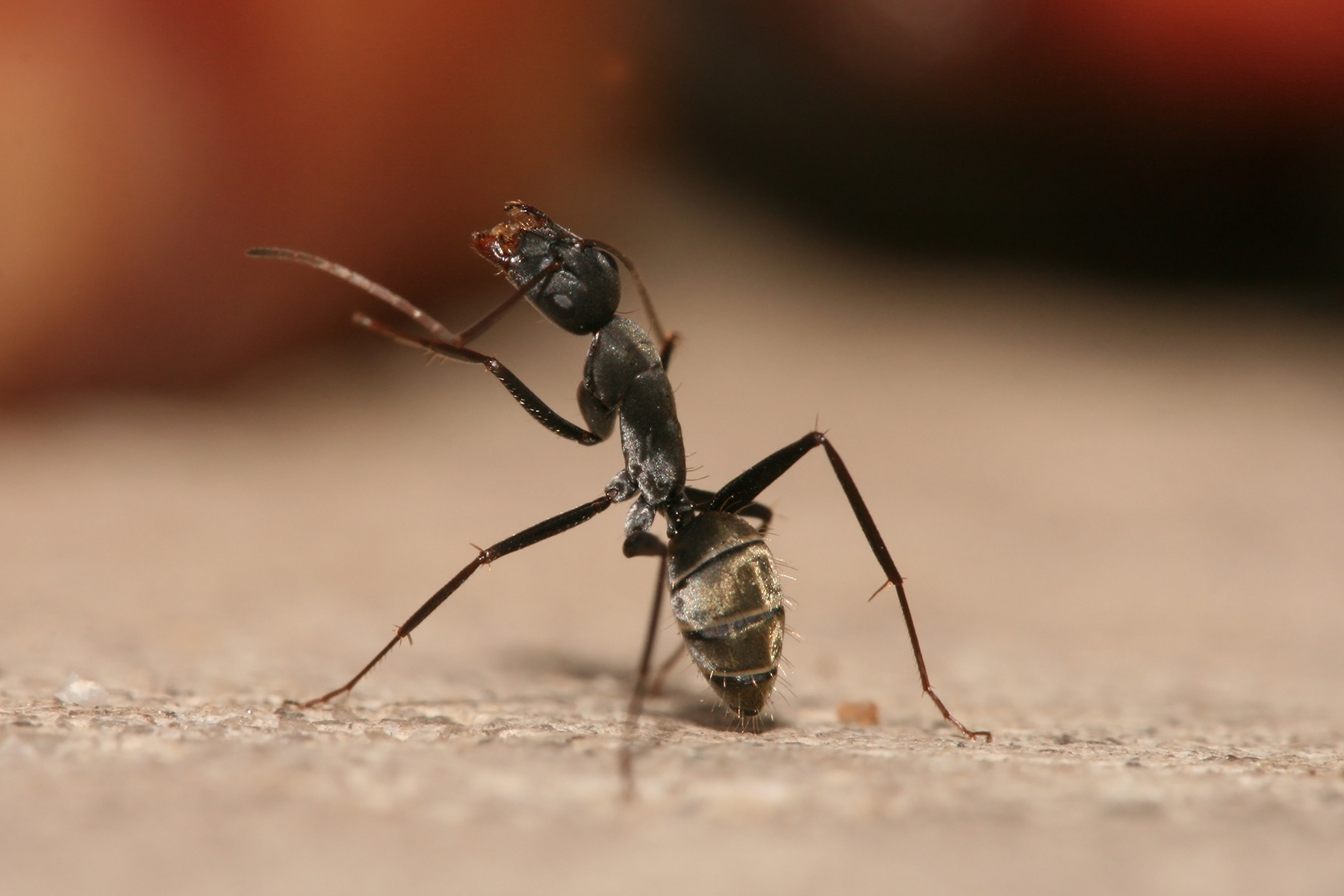
Carpenter ant cleaning antennae

Carpenter ant species reside both outdoors and indoors in moist, decaying, or hollow wood, most commonly in forest environments. They cut "galleries" into the wood grain to provide passageways to allow for movement between different sections of the nest. Certain parts of a house, such as around and under windows, roof eaves, decks and porches, are more likely to be infested by carpenter ants because these areas are most vulnerable to moisture. Carpenter ants have been known to construct extensive underground tunneling systems. These systems often end at some food source – often aphid colonies, where the ants extract and feed on honeydew. These tunneling systems also often exist in trees. The colonies typically include a central "parent" colony surrounded and supplemented by smaller satellite colonies.

=== Food ===
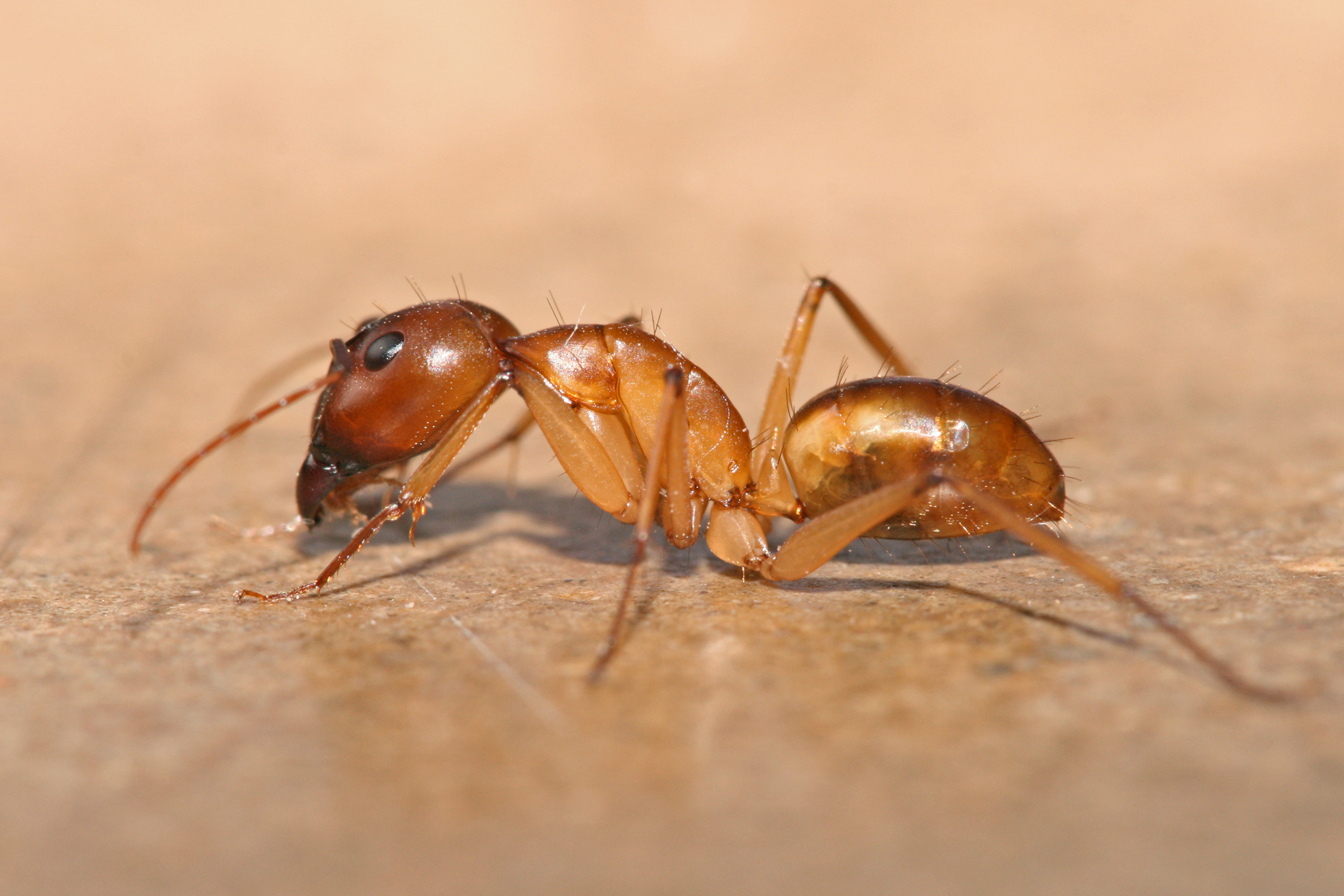
A major worker of Camponotus spp.

Carpenter ants are considered both predators and scavengers. These ants are foragers that typically eat parts of other dead insects or substances derived from other insects. Common foods for them include insect parts, "honeydew" produced by aphids, and extrafloral nectar from plants. They are also known for eating other sugary liquids such as honey, syrup, or juices and engaging in trophallaxis. Carpenter ants can increase the survivability of aphids when they tend them.

Most species of carpenter ants forage at night. When foraging, they usually collect and consume dead insects. Some species less commonly collect live insects. When they discover a dead insect, workers surround it and extract its body fluids to be carried back to the nest. The remaining chitin-based shell is left behind. Occasionally, the ants bring the chitinous head of the insect back to the nest, where they also extract its inner tissue. The ants can forage individually or in small or large groups, though they often opt to do so individually. Different colonies in close proximity may have overlapping foraging regions, although they typically do not assist each other in foraging. Their main food sources normally include proteins and carbohydrates. Instances of carpenter ants bleeding Chinese elm trees for the sap have been observed in northern Arizona. These instances may be rare, as the colonies vastly exceeded the typical size of carpenter ant colonies elsewhere. When workers find food sources, they communicate this information to the rest of the nest. They use biochemical pheromones to mark the shortest path that can be taken from the nest to the source. When a sizable number of workers follows this trail, the strength of the cue increases and a foraging trail is established. This ends when the food source is depleted. The workers will then feed the queen and the larvae by consuming the food they have found, and regurgitating the food at the nest. Foraging trails can be either under or above ground.

Although carpenter ants do not tend to be extremely aggressive, they have developed mechanisms to maximize what they take from a food source when that same food source is also visited by competing organisms. This is accomplished in different ways. Sometimes they colonize an area near a relatively static food supply. More often, they develop a systemic way to visit the food source, with alternating trips by different individual ants or groups. This allows them to decrease the gains of intruders because the intruders tend to visit in a scattered, random, and unorganized manner. The ants, however, visit the sources systematically so that they reduce the average crop remaining. They tend to visit more resource-dense food areas in an attempt to minimize resource availability for others. That is, the more systematic the foraging behavior of the ants, the more random that of its competitors.

Contrary to popular belief, carpenter ants do not actually eat wood, as they are unable to digest cellulose. They only create tunnels and nests within it.

Some carpenter ant species can obtain nitrogen by feeding on urine or urine-stained sand. This may be beneficial in nitrogen-limited environments.

=== Symbionts ===
All ants in this genus, and some related genera, possess an obligate bacterial endosymbiont called Blochmannia. This bacterium has a small genome, and retains genes to biosynthesize essential amino acids and other nutrients. This suggests the bacterium plays a role in ant nutrition. Many Camponotus species are also infected with Wolbachia, another endosymbiont that is widespread across insect groups. Wolbachia is associated with the nurse cells in the queen's ovaries in the species Camponotus textor, which results in the worker larva being infected.

== Behavior and ecology ==
=== Nesting ===
Carpenter ant colony in an old fir stump

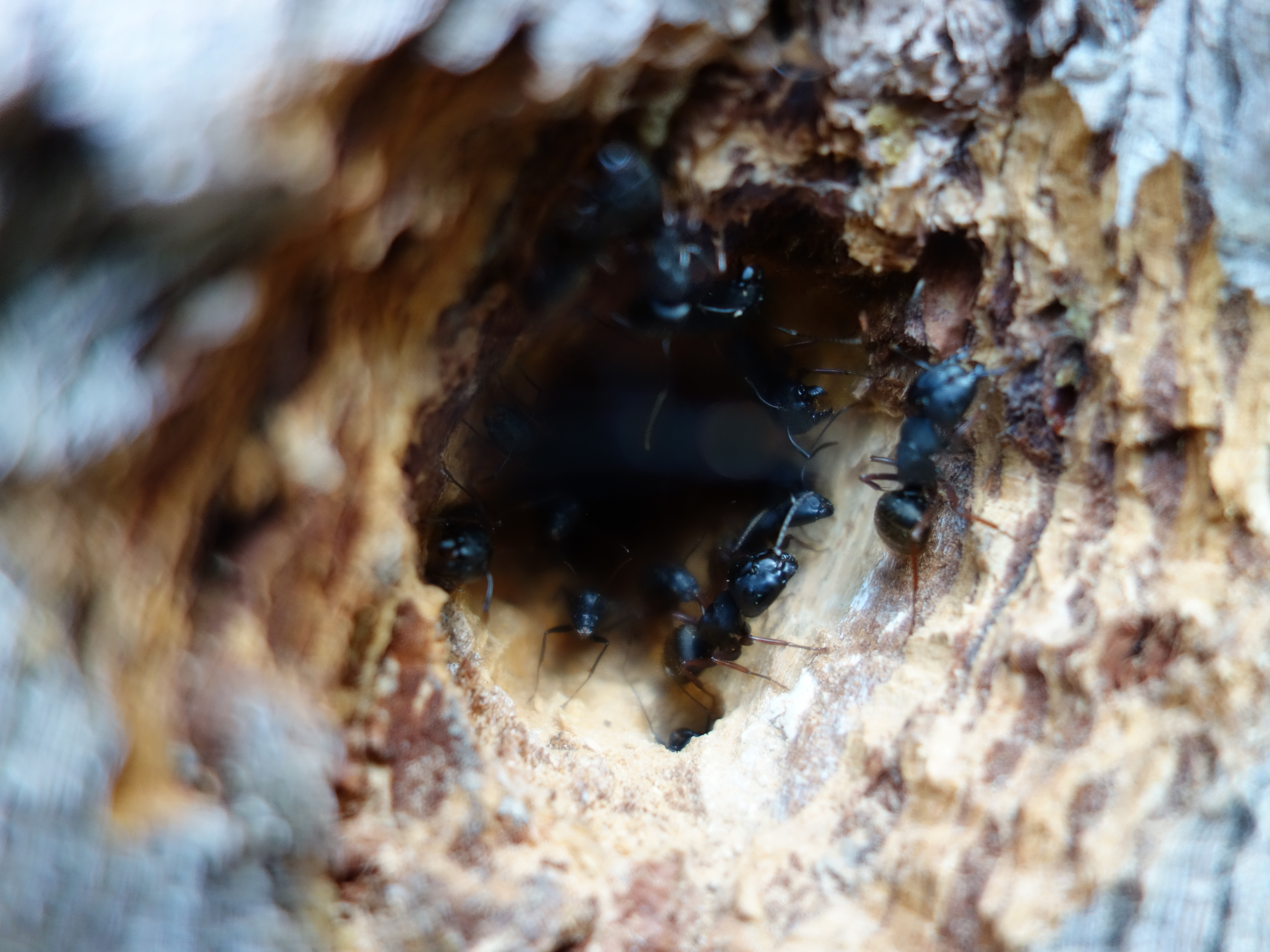
Carpenter ants in a tree

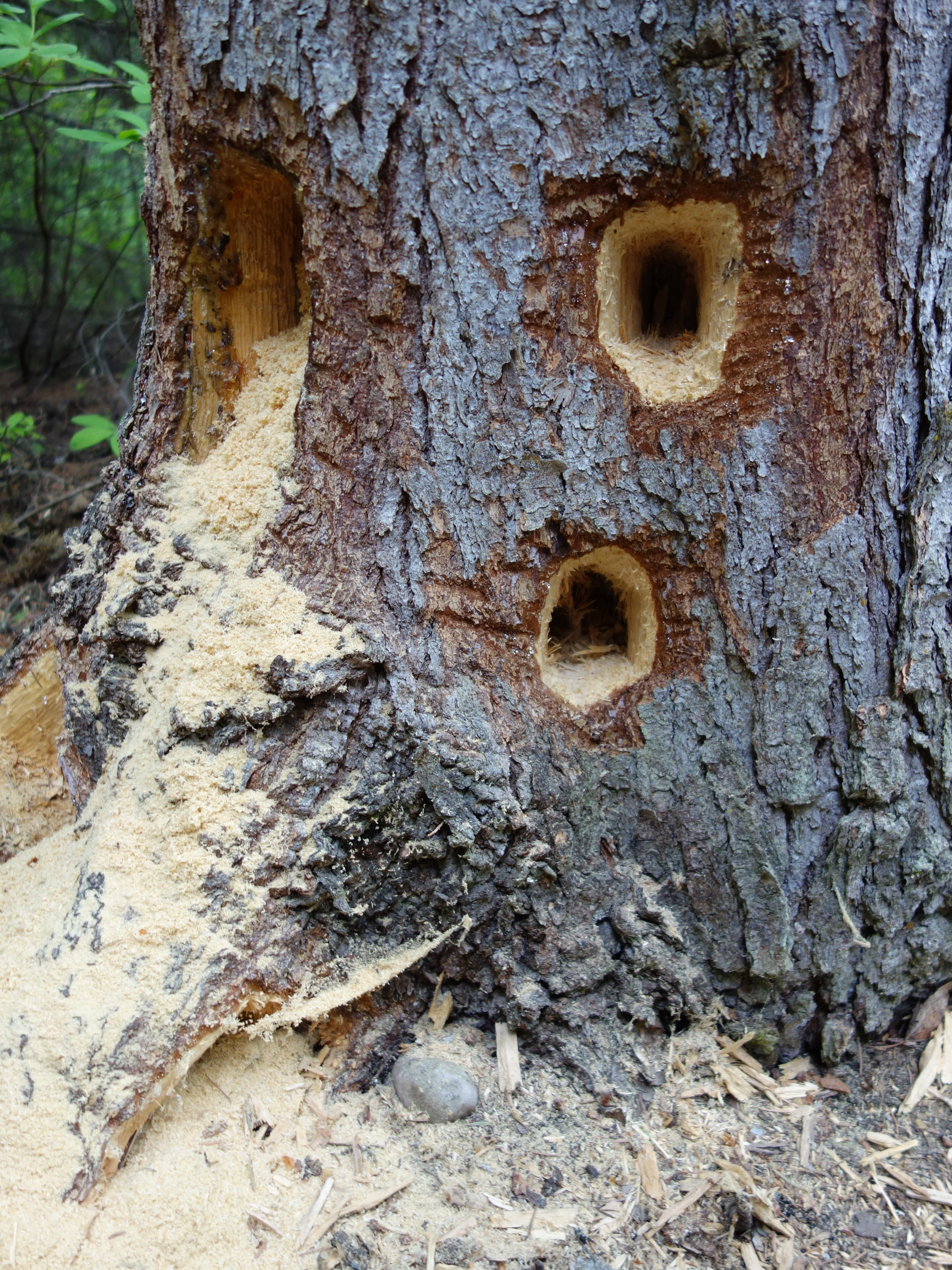
Pileated woodpecker holes in a tree occupied by carpenter ants

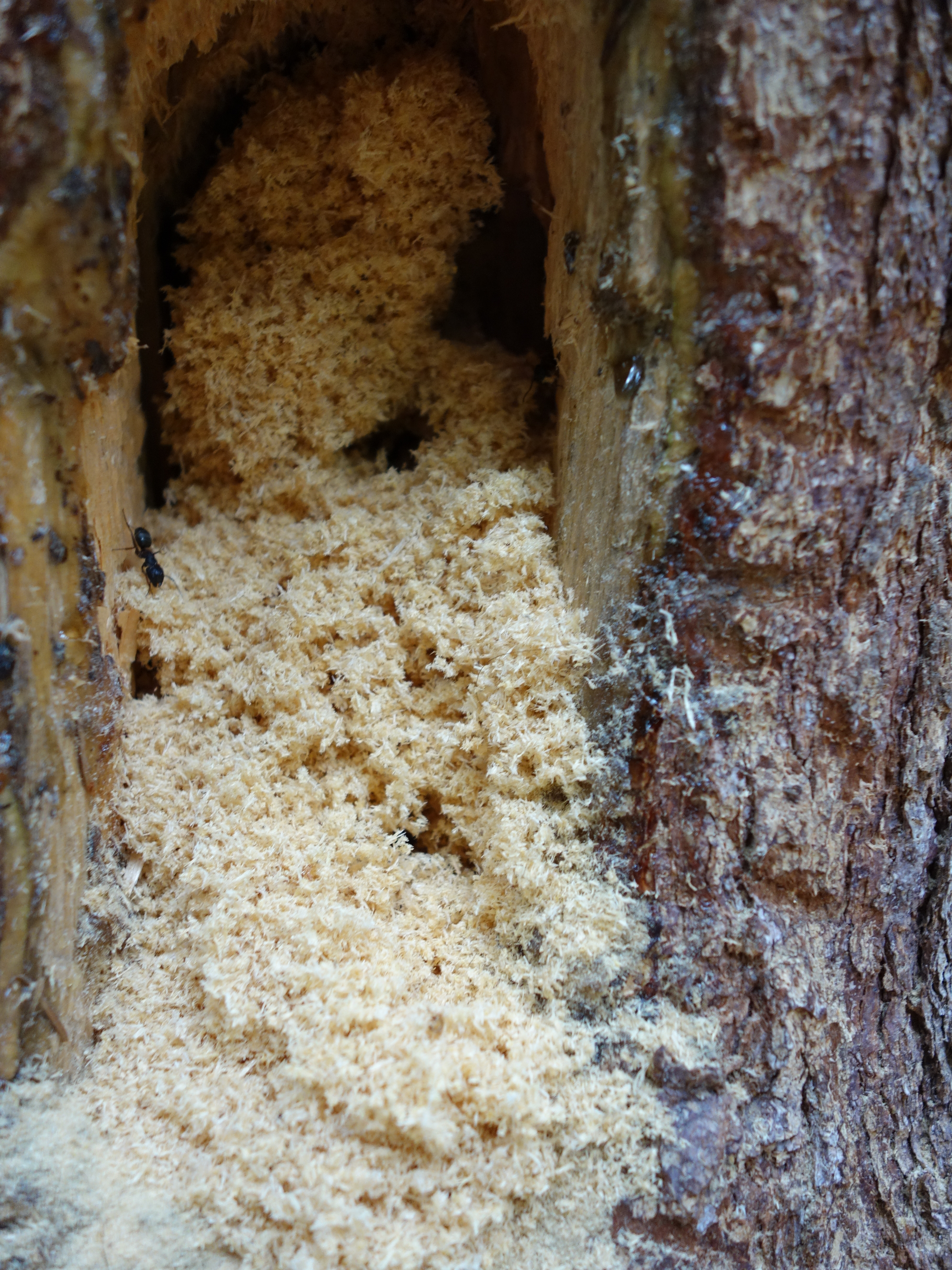
Sawdust like shavings from carpenter ants

Carpenter ants work to build the nests that house eggs in environments with usually high humidity due to their sensitivity to environmental humidity. These nests are called primary nests. Satellite nests are constructed once the primary nest is established and has begun to mature. Residents of satellite nests include older larvae, pupae, and some winged individuals, such as male ants (drones), or future queen ants. Only eggs, the newly hatched larvae, workers, and the queen reside in the primary nests. As satellite nests do not have environmentally sensitive eggs, the ants can construct them in rather diverse locations that can actually be relatively dry. Some species, like Camponotus vagus, build the nest in a dry place, usually in wood.

==== Nuptial flight ====
When conditions are warm and humid, winged males and females participate in a nuptial flight. They emerge from their satellite nests and females mate with a number of males while in flight. The males die after mating. These newly fertilized queens discard their wings and search for new areas to establish primary nests. The queens build new nests and deposit around 20 eggs, nurturing them as they grow until worker ants emerge. The worker ants eventually assist her in caring for the brood as she lays more eggs. After a few years, reproductive winged ants are born, allowing for the making of new colonies. Again, satellite nests will be established and the process will repeat itself.

=== Relatedness ===
Relatedness is the probability that a gene in one individual is an identical copy, by descent, of a gene in another individual. It is essentially a measure of how closely related two individuals are with respect to a gene. It is quantified by the coefficient of relatedness, which is a number between zero and one. The larger the value, the more two individuals are "related". Carpenter ants are social hymenopteran insects. This means the relatedness between offspring and parents is disproportionate. Females are more closely related to their sisters than they are to their offspring. Between full sisters, the coefficient of relatedness is r > 0.75 (due to their haplodiploid genetic system). Between parent and offspring, the coefficient of relatedness is r = 0.5, because, given the event in meiosis, a certain gene has a 50% chance of being passed on to the offspring.

=== Genetic diversity ===
Eusocial insects tend to present low genetic diversity within colonies, which can increase with the co-occurrence of multiple queens (polygyny) or with multiple mating by a single queen (polyandry). Distinct reproductive strategies may generate similar patterns of genetic diversity in ants.

=== Kin recognition ===
According to Hamilton's rule for relatedness, for relative-specific interactions to occur, such as kin altruism, a high level of relatedness is necessary between two individuals. Carpenter ants, like many social insect species, have mechanisms by which individuals determine whether others are nestmates or not. They are useful because they explain the presence or absence of altruistic behavior between individuals. They also act as evolutionary strategies to help prevent incest and promote kin selection. Social carpenter ants recognize their kin in many ways. These methods of recognition are largely chemical in nature, and include environmental odors, pheromones, "transferable labels", and labels from the queen that are distributed to and among nest members. Because they have a chemical basis for emission and recognition, odors are useful because many ants can detect such changes in their environment through their antennae.

The process of recognition for carpenter ants requires two events. First, a cue must be present on a "donor animal". These cues are called "labels". Next, the receiving animal must be able to recognize and process the cue. In order for an individual carpenter ant to be recognized as a nestmate, it must, as an adult, go through specific interactions with older members of the nest. This process is also necessary in order for the ant to recognize and distinguish other individuals. If these interactions do not occur in the beginning of adult life, the ant will be unable to be distinguished as a nestmate and unable to distinguish nestmates.

=== Kin altruism ===
Recognition allows for the presence of kin-specific interactions, such as kin altruism. Altruistic individuals increase other individuals' fitness at the expense of their own. Carpenter ants perform altruistic actions toward their nestmates so that their shared genes are propagated more readily or more often. In many social insect species like these ants, many worker animals are sterile and do not have the ability to reproduce. As a result, they forgo reproduction to donate energy and help the fertile individuals reproduce.

=== Pheromones ===
As in most other social insect species, individual interaction is heavily influenced by the queen. The queen can influence individuals with odors called pheromones, which can have different effects. Some pheromones have been known to calm workers, while others have been known to excite them. Pheromonal cues from ovipositing queens have a stronger effect on worker ants than those of virgin queens.

=== Social immunity ===
In many social insect species, social behavior can increase the disease resistance of animals. This phenomenon, called social immunity, exists in carpenter ants. It is mediated through the feeding of other individuals by regurgitation. The regurgitate can have antimicrobial activity, which would be spread amongst members of the colony. Some proteases with antimicrobial activity have been found to exist in regurgitated material. Communal sharing of immune response capability is likely to play a large role in colonial maintenance during highly pathogenic periods.

=== Polygyny ===
Polygyny often is associated with many social insect species, and usually is characterized by limited mating flights, small queen size, and other characteristics. However, carpenter ants have "extensive" mating flights and relatively large queens, distinguishing them from polygynous species. Carpenter ants are described as oligogynous because they have a number of fertile queens which are intolerant of each other and must therefore spread to different areas of the nest. Some aggressive interactions have been known to take place between queens, but not necessarily through workers. Queens become aggressive mainly to other queens if they trespass on a marked territory. Queens in a given colony can work together in brood care and the workers tend to experience higher rates of survival in colonies with multiple queens. Some researchers still subscribe to the notion that carpenter ant colonies are only monogynous.

=== Venom ===
Like other formicine ants, Camponotus possess a poisonous secretion containing formic acid, which is produced and stored in the venom gland and can be discharged through an abdominal opening, the acidopore. Camponotus use their venom for predation, defense, and alarm communication and recruitment. In some cases, Camponotus use their venom to detoxify the alkaloid-based venoms of fire ants (Solenopsis spp.). Florida carpenter ants (Camponotus floridanus) swallow their own venom, which acidifies the crop and shapes the gut microbiome. In addition to formic acid, the venoms of several Camponotus species contain peptides. These so-called formicitoxins are thought to help combat pathogenic fungi.

== Subgenera ==
Camponotus currently has 43 subgenera.

- Camponotus Mayr, 1861
- Dendromyrmex Emery, 1895
- Forelophilus Kutter, 1931
- Hypercolobopsis Emery, 1920
- Karavaievia Emery, 1925
- Manniella Wheeler, W.M., 1921
- Mayria Forel, 1878
- Myrmacrhaphe Santschi, 1926
- Myrmamblys Forel, 1912
- Myrmaphaenus Emery, 1920
- Myrmentoma Forel, 1912
- Myrmepomis Forel, 1912
- Myrmespera Santschi, 1926
- Myrmeurynota Forel, 1912
- Myrmisolepis Santschi, 1921
- Myrmobrachys Forel, 1912
- Myrmocladoecus Wheeler, W.M., 1921
- Myrmodirhachis Emery, 1925
- Myrmomalis Forel, 1914
- Myrmonesites Emery, 1920
- Myrmopalpella Stärcke, 1934
- Myrmopelta Santschi, 1921
- Myrmophyma Forel, 1912
- Myrmopiromis Wheeler, W.M., 1921
- Myrmoplatypus Santschi, 1921
- Myrmoplatys Forel, 1916
- Myrmopsamma Forel, 1914
- Myrmosaga Forel, 1912
- Myrmosaulus Wheeler, W.M., 1921
- Myrmosericus Forel, 1912
- Myrmosphincta Forel, 1912
- Myrmostenus Emery, 1920
- Myrmotarsus Forel, 1912
- Myrmothrix Forel, 1912
- Myrmotrema Forel, 1912
- Myrmoxygenys Emery, 1925
- Orthonotomyrmex Ashmead, 1906
- Paramyrmamblys Santschi, 1926
- Phasmomyrmex Stitz, 1910
- Pseudocolobopsis Emery, 1920
- Rhinomyrmex Forel, 1886
- Tanaemyrmex Ashmead, 1905
- Thlipsepinotus Santschi, 1928

== Selected species ==
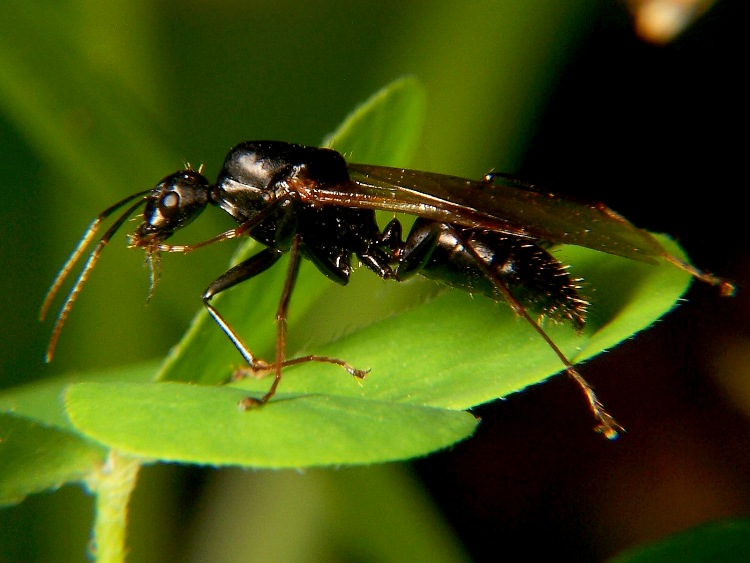
C. pennsylvanicus, winged male

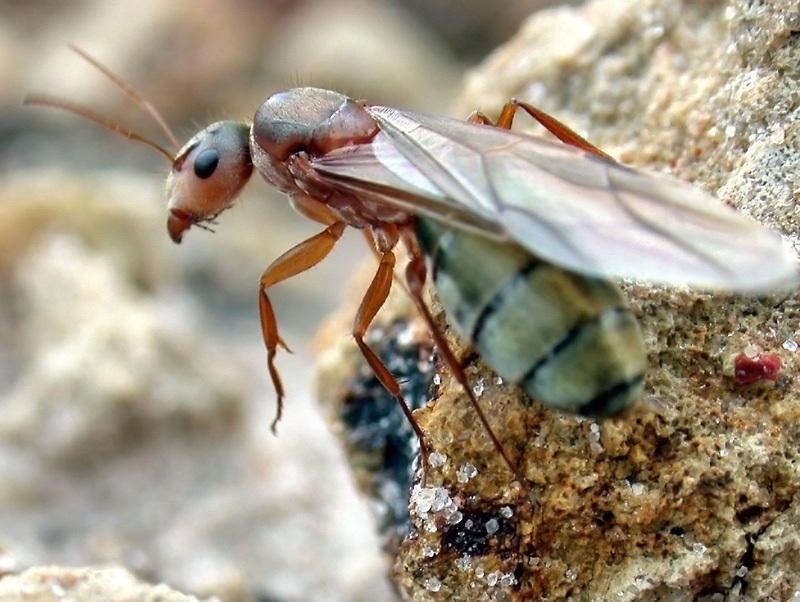
C. crispulus queen

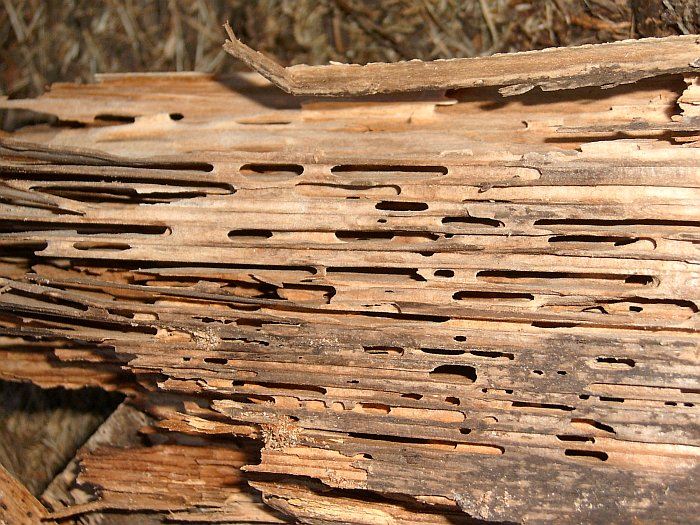
Wood damage by C. herculeanus

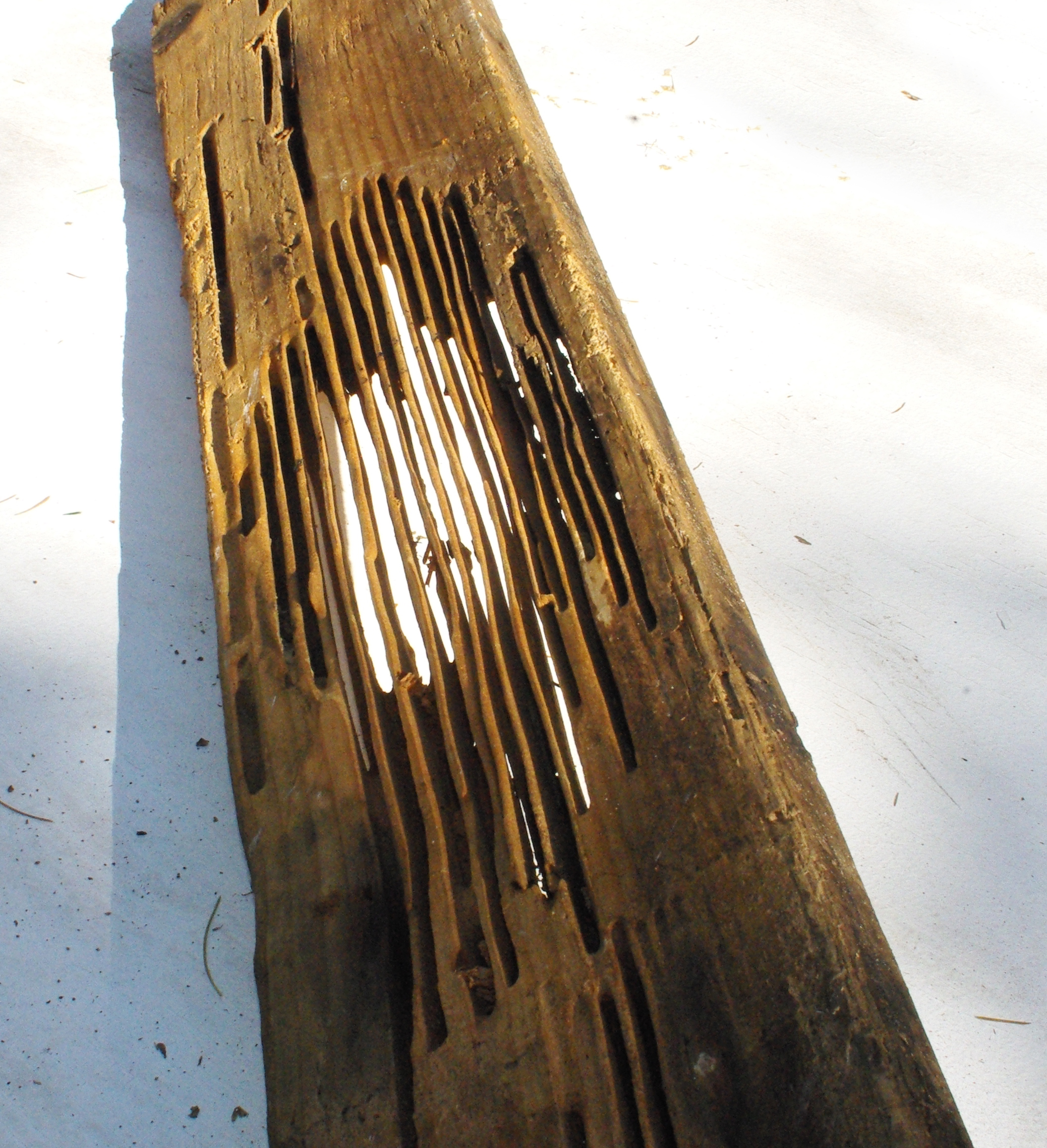
This structural board was destroyed by carpenter ants. They left the dense "late wood" of each growth ring intact, to use as galleries.

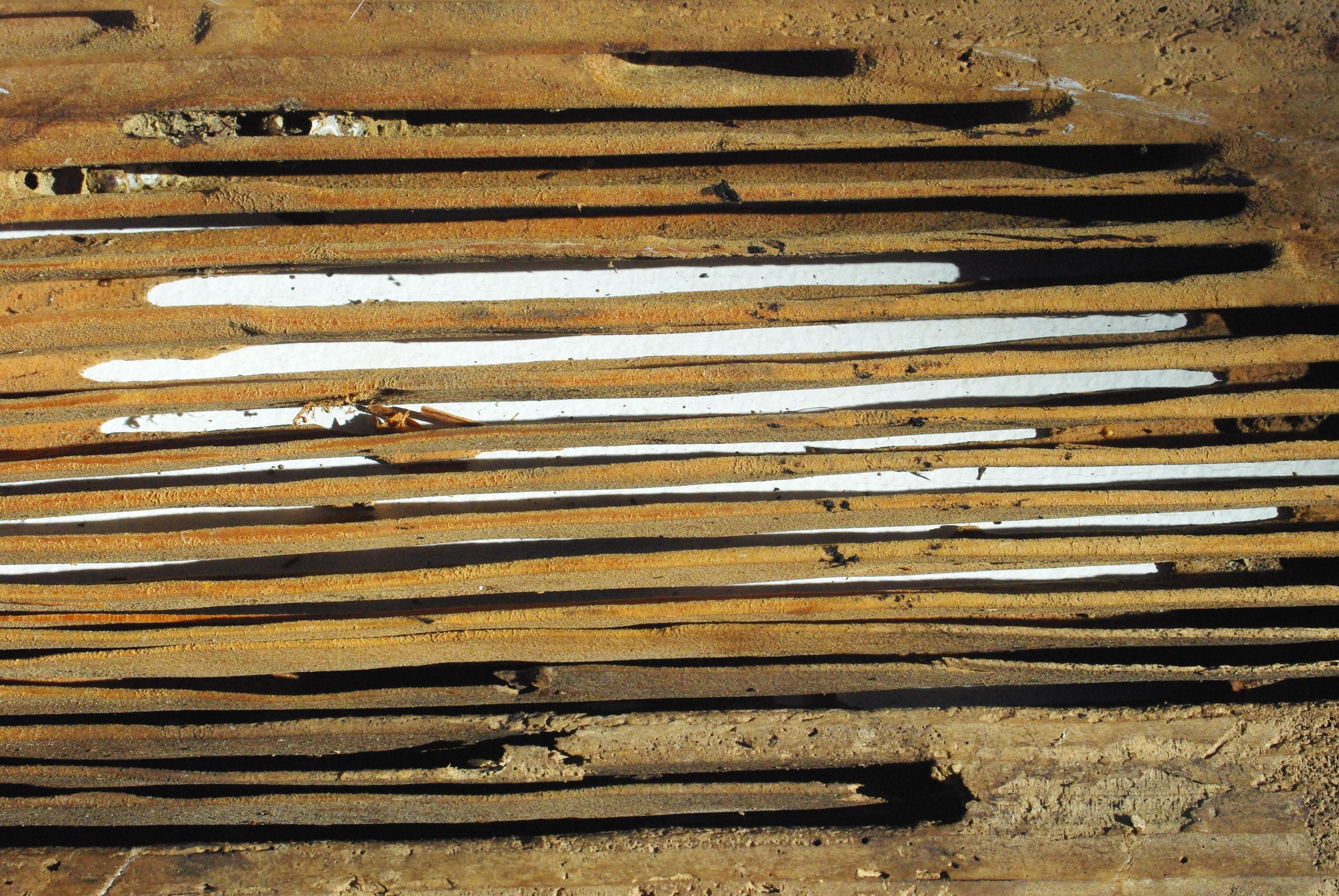
A closeup of carpenter ant created galleries.

- Camponotus aeneopilosus Mayr, 1862 – Golden tail sugar ant
- Camponotus amaurus (Espadaler, 1997)
- Camponotus americanus
- Camponotus atriceps – Florida carpenter ant (cf. C. floridanus)
- Camponotus bishamon
- Camponotus chromaiodes – red carpenter ant
- Camponotus cinctellus – shiny sugar ant
- Camponotus compressus (Fabricius, 1787) – Indian black ant
- Camponotus consobrinus – banded sugar ant
- Camponotus crassus Mayr, 1862
- Camponotus cruentatus (Latreille, 1802)
- Camponotus daitoensis
- Camponotus detritus Emery, 1886 – Namib Desert dune ant
- Camponotus empedocles – glossy sugar ant
- Camponotus fellah (Dalla Torre, 1983)
- Camponotus ferrugineus – red carpenter ant
- Camponotus festinatus (Buckley, 1866)
- Camponotus flavomarginatus Mayr, 1862
- Camponotus floridanus, Florida carpenter ant, genome 90% sequenced
- Camponotus haroi (Espadaler, 1997)
- Camponotus herculeanus (Linnaeus, 1758) – Hercules ant
- Camponotus japonicus Mayr, 1866 – Japanese carpenter ant
- Camponotus kaura
- Camponotus ligniperda, a common species in Europe
- Camponotus modoc Wheeler, W. M., 1910 – western carpenter ant
- Camponotus monju
- Camponotus nearcticus (Emery) – smaller carpenter ant
- Camponotus nigriceps (Smith, 1858) – black-headed sugar ant
- Camponotus novaeboracensis
- Camponotus pennsylvanicus (DeGeer) – black carpenter ant
- Camponotus reburrus Mackay, in Mackay & Barriga, 2012
- Camponotus punctulatus (Mayr) – Tacuru ant
- Camponotus sericeiventris
- Camponotus sericeus
- Camponotus silvestrii Emery, 1906
- Camponotus taino
- Camponotus tortuganus (Emery) – Tortugas carpenter ant
- Camponotus triodiae
- Camponotus universitatis Forel, 1890
- Camponotus vagus Scopoli, 1763
- Camponotus variegatus (Smith, F., 1858) – Hawaiian carpenter ant

== Relationship with humans ==
=== As pests ===
Carpenter ants can damage wood used in the construction of buildings. They can leave behind a sawdust-like material called frass that provides clues to their nesting location. Carpenter ant galleries are smooth and very different from termite-damaged areas, which have mud packed into the hollowed-out areas. Carpenter ants can be identified by the general presence of one upward protruding node, looking like a spike, at the "waist" attachment between the thorax and abdomen (petiole). Control involves application of insecticides (e.g. borax) in various forms including dusts and liquids. The dusts are injected directly into galleries and voids where the carpenter ants are living. The liquids are applied in areas where foraging ants are likely to pick the material up and spread the poison to the colony upon returning.

Carpenter ants are known to nest in moist or decaying wood within homes, often targeting areas such as window frames, wall voids, insulation, and spaces near plumbing leaks. Their preference for damp environments makes locations with water damage or high humidity particularly susceptible to infestation. These nesting habits can lead to structural damage over time if not addressed promptly.

=== As food ===
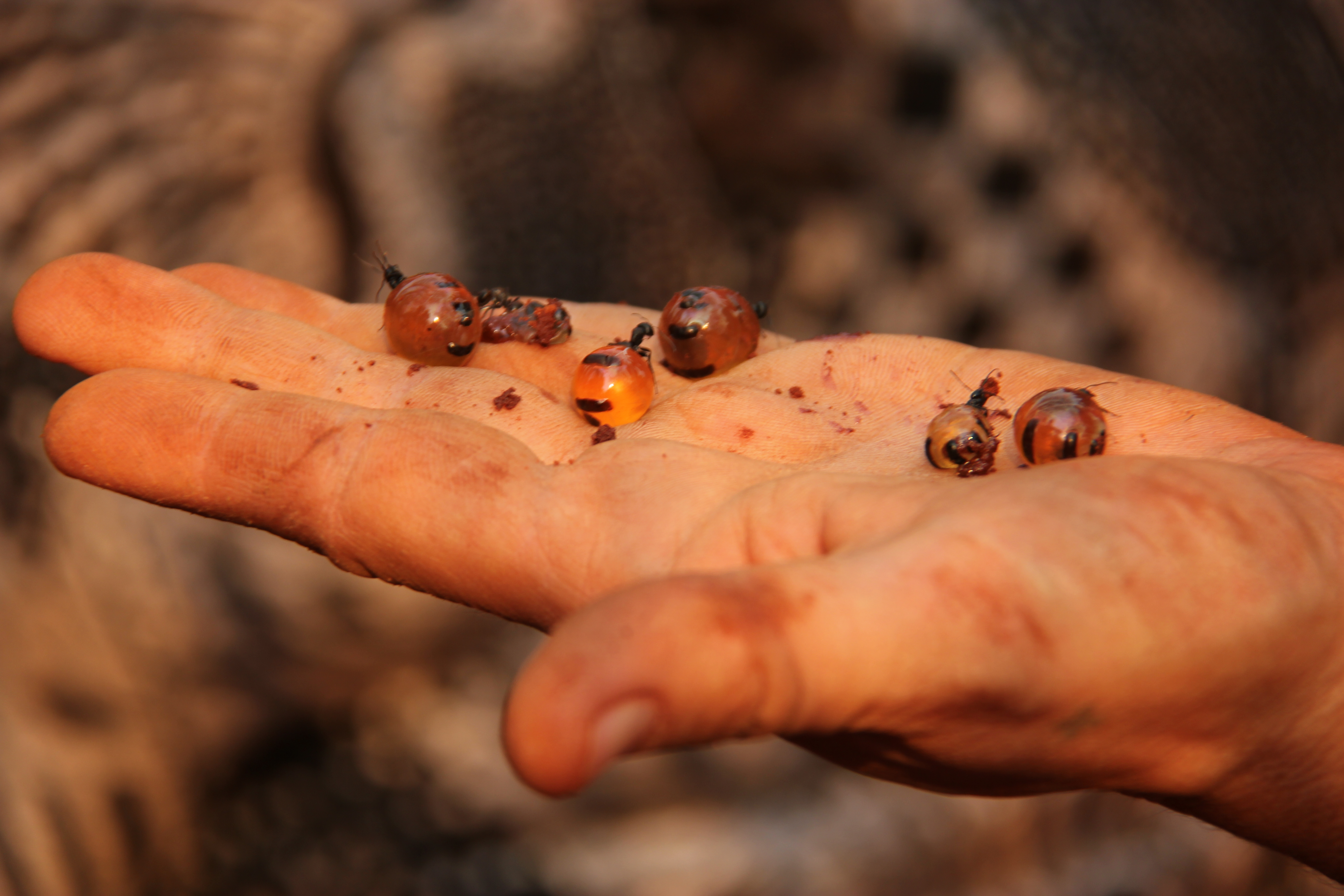
Honeypot ants in Northern Territory, Australia

Carpenter ants and their larvae are eaten in various parts of the world. In Australia, the Honeypot ant (Camponotus inflatus) is regularly eaten raw by Indigenous Australians. It is a particular favourite source of sugar for Australian Aboriginal groups living in arid regions, partially digging up their nests instead of digging them up entirely, in order to preserve this food source. The honey also has antimicrobial properties which the aboriginal population use to their advantage to cure colds.

In John Muir's publication, First Summer in the Sierra, Muir notes that the Northern Paiute people of California ate the tickling, acid gasters of the large jet-black carpenter ants. In Africa, carpenter ants are among a vast number of species that are consumed by the San people.

== See also ==
- Non-human agriculture
