= List of Camponotus species =

This is a list of valid species and subspecies of the formicine ant genus Camponotus, including the carpenter ants. There are over 1,100 species in this genus.

== A ==
- Camponotus aberrans Mayr, 1895
- Camponotus abjectus Santschi, 1937
- Camponotus abrahami Forel, 1913
- Camponotus abscisus Roger, 1863
- Camponotus absquatulator Snelling, R.R., 2006
- Camponotus abunanus Mann, 1916
- Camponotus acutirostris Wheeler, 1910
- Camponotus acvapimensis Mayr, 1862
- Camponotus adami Forel, 1910
- Camponotus adenensis Emery, 1893
- Camponotus adustus Viehmeyer, 1916
- Camponotus aegaeus Emery, 1915
- Camponotus aegyptiacus Emery, 1915
- Camponotus aeneopilosus Mayr, 1862
- Camponotus aequatorialis Roger, 1863
- Camponotus aequitas Santschi, 1920
- Camponotus aethiops (Latreille, 1798)
- Camponotus afflatus Viehmeyer, 1925
- Camponotus ager (Smith F., 1858)
- Camponotus agonius Santschi, 1915
- Camponotus aguilerai Kusnezov, 1952
- Camponotus aina Rakotonirina & Fisher, 2022
- Camponotus akiae Yamane & Hosoishi, 2023
- Camponotus aktaci Karaman, 2013
- Camponotus alacer Forel, 1912
- Camponotus alamaina Rakotonirina, Csösz & Fisher, 2016
- Camponotus albicoxis Forel, 1899
- Camponotus albipes Emery, 1893
- Camponotus albistramineus Wheeler, 1936
- Camponotus albivillosus Zhou, 2001
- Camponotus alboannulatus Mayr, 1887
- Camponotus albocinctus (Ashmead, 1905)
- Camponotus albosparsus Bingham, 1903
- Camponotus alii Forel, 1890
- Camponotus altivagans Wheeler, 1936
- Camponotus amamianus Terayama, 1991
- Camponotus amaurus Espadaler, 1997
- Camponotus americanus Mayr, 1862
- Camponotus amoris Forel, 1904
- Camponotus amphidus Santschi, 1926
- Camponotus anatolicus Karaman & Aktaç, 2013
- Camponotus andrei Forel, 1885
- Camponotus andrewsi Donisthorpe, 1936
- Camponotus andrianjaka Rasoamanana & Fisher, 2022
- Camponotus androy Rakotonirina, Csösz & Fisher, 2016
- Camponotus andyyoungi McArthur, 2008
- Camponotus anezkae Klimes & McArthur, 2014
- Camponotus anguliceps Stitz, 1938
- Camponotus angusticeps Emery, 1886
- Camponotus angusticollis (Jerdon, 1851)
- Camponotus anningensis Wu and Wang, 1989
- Camponotus annulatus Karavaiev, 1929
- Camponotus anthrax Wheeler, 1911
- Camponotus antsaraingy Rasoamanana & Fisher, 2022
- Camponotus apicalis (Mann, 1916)
- Camponotus apostolus Forel, 1901
- Camponotus arabicus Collingwood, 1985
- Camponotus arboreus (Smith F., 1858)
- Camponotus arcuatus Mayr, 1876
- Camponotus arenatus Shattuck and McArthur, 2002
- Camponotus argus Santschi, 1935
- Camponotus arhuacus Forel, 1902
- Camponotus armeniacus Arnol’di, 1967
- Camponotus arminius Forel, 1910
- Camponotus armstrongi McAreavey, 1949
- Camponotus arnoldinus Forel, 1914
- Camponotus aro Rakotonirina & Fisher, 2022
- Camponotus arrogans (Smith F., 1858)
- Camponotus asara Rakotonirina & Fisher, 2022
- Camponotus ashokai Karmaly & Narendran, 2006
- Camponotus asli Dumpert, 1989
- Camponotus aterrimus Emery, 1895
- Camponotus atimo Rakotonirina & Fisher, 2022
- Camponotus atlantis Forel, 1890
- Camponotus atriceps (Smith F., 1858)
- Camponotus atricolor (Nylander, 1849)
- Camponotus atriscapus Santschi, 1926
- Camponotus atrox Emery, 1925
- Camponotus augustei Wheeler and Mann, 1914
- Camponotus auratiacus Zhou, 2001
- Camponotus aurelianus Forel, 1912
- Camponotus aureopilus Viehmeyer, 1914
- Camponotus aureus Dumpert, 2006
- Camponotus auricomus Roger, 1862
- Camponotus auriculatus Mayr, 1897
- Camponotus auriventris Emery, 1889
- Camponotus aurocinctus (Smith F., 1858)
- Camponotus aurofasciatus Santschi, 1915
- Camponotus auropubens Forel, 1894
- Camponotus aurosus Roger, 1863
- Camponotus autrani Forel, 1886
- Camponotus avius Santschi, 1926

== B ==
- Camponotus bakeri Wheeler, 1904
- Camponotus bakhtiariensis Salata, Khalili-Moghadam & Borowiec, 2020
- Camponotus baldaccii Emery, 1908
- Camponotus balzani Emery, 1894
- Camponotus banghaasi Emery, 1903
- Camponotus barbaricus Emery, 1905
- Camponotus barbarossa Emery, 1920
- Camponotus barbatus Roger, 1863
- Camponotus barbosus Baroni Urbani, 1972
- Camponotus basuto Arnold, 1958
- Camponotus batesii Forel, 1895
- Camponotus bayeri Forel, 1913
- Camponotus baynei Arnold, 1922
- Camponotus beccarii Emery, 1887
- Camponotus becki Santschi, 1923
- Camponotus bedoti Emery, 1893
- Camponotus beebei Wheeler, 1918
- Camponotus bellacolor Mackay, 2019
- Camponotus belligerus Santschi, 1920
- Camponotus bellus Forel, 1908
- Camponotus belumensis Dumpert, 1995
- Camponotus bemaheva Rakotonirina & Fisher, 2022
- Camponotus benguelensis Santschi, 1911
- Camponotus benguetensis Zettel & Balàka, 2018
- Camponotus bermudezi Aguayo, 1932
- Camponotus berthoudi Forel, 1879
- Camponotus bertolonii Emery, 1895
- Camponotus bevohitra Rakotonirina, Csösz & Fisher, 2016
- Camponotus bianconii Emery, 1895
- Camponotus bidens Mayr, 1870
- Camponotus bifossus Santschi, 1917
- Camponotus bigenus Santschi, 1919
- Camponotus binghamii Forel, 1894
- Camponotus biolleyi Forel, 1902
- Camponotus bishamon Terayama, 1999
- Camponotus bispinosus Mayr, 1870
- Camponotus biturberculatus Andre, 1889
- Camponotus blandus (Smith F., 1858)
- Camponotus bocki Forel, 1907
- Camponotus boghossiani Forel, 1911
- Camponotus boivini Forel, 1891
- Camponotus bonariensis Mayr, 1868
- Camponotus borellii Emery, 1894
- Camponotus boriquen Duarte & Breto, 2024
- Camponotus bottegoi Emery, 1895
- Camponotus bozaka Rakotonirina & Fisher, 2022
- Camponotus bradleyi Wheeler, 1934
- Camponotus branneri (Mann, 1916)
- Camponotus brasiliensis Mayr, 1862
- Camponotus braunsi Mayr, 1895
- Camponotus brettesi Forel, 1899
- Camponotus brevicollis Stitz, 1916
- Camponotus brevipilis MacKay, 2025
- Camponotus brevis Forel, 1899
- Camponotus breviscapus Zhou, 2001
- Camponotus brevisetosus Forel, 1910
- Camponotus britteni Donisthorpe, 1931
- Camponotus brookei Forel, 1914
- Camponotus bruchi Forel, 1912
- Camponotus brullei (Smith F., 1858)
- Camponotus bruneiensis Viehmeyer, 1922
- Camponotus brunni Forel, 1901
- Camponotus brutus Forel, 1886
- Camponotus buchholzi Mayr, 1902
- Camponotus buchneri Forel, 1886
- Camponotus buddhae Forel, 1892
- Camponotus bugnioni Forel, 1899
- Camponotus burgeoni Santschi, 1926
- Camponotus butteli Forel, 1905
- Camponotus buttikeri Arnold, 1958

== C ==
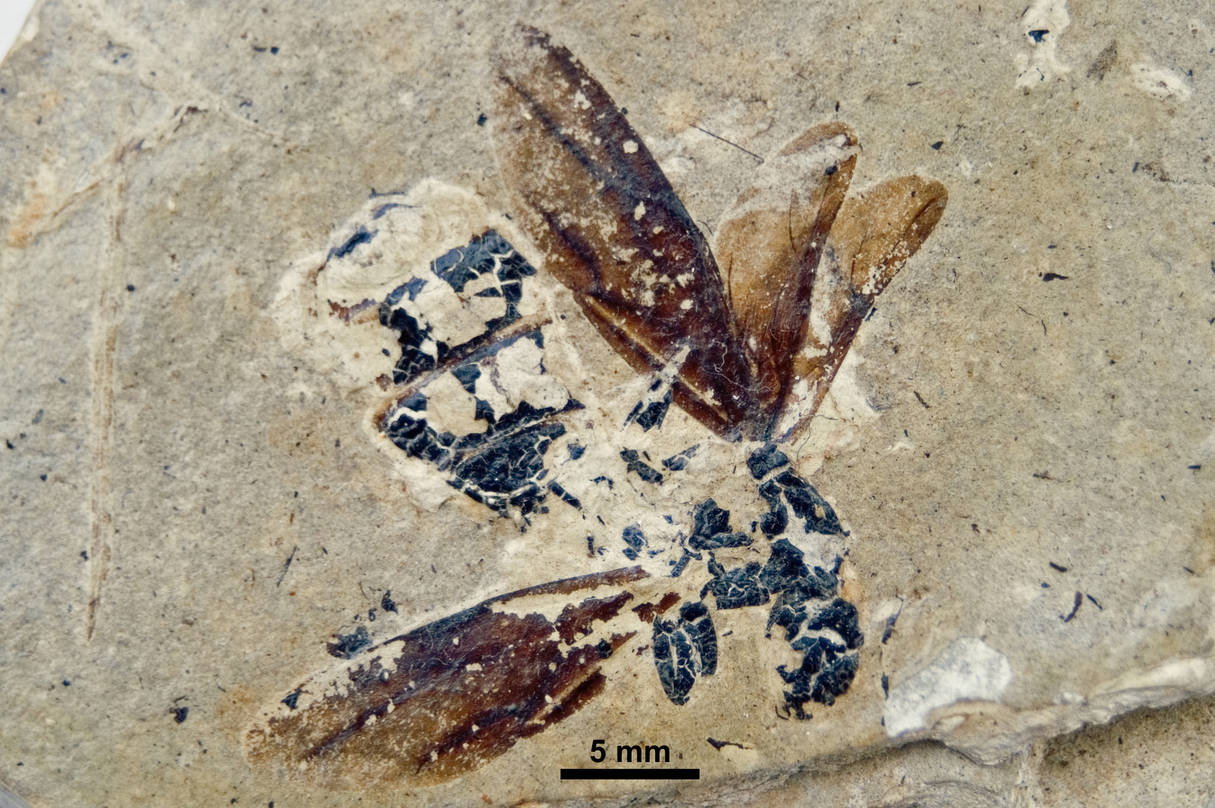
†Camponotus crozei holotype queen, Miocene

- Camponotus cacicus Emery, 1903
- Camponotus caesar Forel, 1886
- Camponotus caffer Emery, 1895
- Camponotus callistus Emery, 1911
- Camponotus callmorphus Stitz, 1923
- Camponotus camelinus (Smith F., 1857)
- Camponotus cameloides (Smith F., 1857)
- Camponotus cameranoi Emery, 1894
- Camponotus cameratus Viehmeyer, 1925
- Camponotus cameroni Forel, 1892
- Camponotus candiotes Emery, 1894
- Camponotus canescens Mayr, 1870
- Camponotus capito Mayr, 1876
- Camponotus capperi Forel, 1899
- Camponotus caracalla Forel, 1912
- Camponotus carbo Emery, 1877
- Camponotus carbonarius (Latreille, 1802)
- Camponotus carin Emery, 1889
- Camponotus carinifer Viehmeyer, 1916
- Camponotus caryae (Fitch, 1855)
- Camponotus castaneus (Latreille, 1802)
- Camponotus castanicola Donisthorpe, 1943
- Camponotus cecconii Emery, 1908
- Camponotus cemeryi Özdikmen, 2010
- Camponotus ceriseipes Clark, 1938
- Camponotus cervicalis Roger, 1863
- Camponotus chalceoides Clark, 1938
- Camponotus chalceus Crawley, 1915
- Camponotus championi Forel, 1899
- Camponotus chapini Wheeler, W. M., 1922
- Camponotus chartifex (Smith F., 1860)
- Camponotus chazaliei Forel, 1899
- Camponotus cheesmanae Donisthorpe, 1932
- Camponotus chilensis (Spinola, 1851)
- Camponotus chilon Taylor et al., 2018
- Camponotus chloroticus Emery, 1897
- Camponotus chongqingensis Wu and Wang, 1989
- Camponotus chrislaini Rasoamanana & Fisher, 2022
- Camponotus christi Forel, 1886
- Camponotus christophei Wheeler, and Mann, 1914
- Camponotus christopherseni Forel, 1912
- Camponotus chriswilsoni MacKay, 2025
- Camponotus chromaiodes Bolton, 1995
- Camponotus chrysurus Gerstacker, 1871
- Camponotus chucki Fisher, 2025
- Camponotus cilicicus Emery, 1908
- Camponotus cillae Forel, 1912
- Camponotus cinctellus (Gerstacker, 1859)
- Camponotus cinerascens (Fabricius, 1787)
- Camponotus cinereus Mayr, 1876
- Camponotus cingulatus Mayr, 1862
- Camponotus circularis Mayr, 1870
- Camponotus circumspectus (Smith F., 1861)
- Camponotus clarior Forel, 1902
- Camponotus claripes Mayr, 1876
- Camponotus clarithorax Creighton, 1950
- Camponotus claveri Rasoamanana & Fisher, 2022
- Camponotus claviscapus Forel, 1899
- Camponotus cleobulus Santschi, 1919
- Camponotus clypeatus Mayr, 1866
- Camponotus cocosensis Wheeler, 1919
- Camponotus cognatocompressus Forel, 1904
- Camponotus coloratus Forel, 1904
- Camponotus compositor Santschi, 1922
- Camponotus compressiscapus Andre, 1889
- Camponotus compressus (Fabricius, 1787)
- Camponotus concilians Forel, 1915
- Camponotus concolor Forel, 1891
- Camponotus concurrens Zettel & Laciny, 2018
- Camponotus confluens Forel, 1913
- Camponotus confucii Forel, 1894
- Camponotus confusus Emery, 1887
- Camponotus congolensis Emery, 1899
- Camponotus coniceps Santschi, 1926
- Camponotus conradti Forel, 1914
- Camponotus consanguineus (Smith F., 1861)
- Camponotus consectator (Smith F., 1858)
- Camponotus consobrinus (Erichson, 1842)
- Camponotus conspicuus (Smith F., 1858)
- Camponotus constructor Forel, 1899
- Camponotus contractus Mayr, 1872
- Camponotus conulus Mayr, 1870
- Camponotus convexiclypeus MacKay, 1997
- Camponotus coptobregma Kempf, 1968
- Camponotus cordiceps Santschi, 1939
- Camponotus cordincola Wheeler, 1934
- Camponotus coriolanus Forel, 1912
- Camponotus corniculatus Wheeler, 1934
- Camponotus cornis Wang and Wu, 1994
- Camponotus coruscus (Smith F., 1862)
- Camponotus cosmicus (Smith F., 1858)
- Camponotus coxalis (Smith F., 1859)
- Camponotus crassicornis Emery, 1920
- Camponotus crassiculus MacKay, 2025
- Camponotus crassisquamis Forel, 1902
- Camponotus crassus Mayr, 1862
- Camponotus crawleyi Emery, 1920
- Camponotus crenatus Mayr, 1876
- Camponotus crepusculi Arnold, 1922
- Camponotus cressoni Andre, 1887
- Camponotus criniticeps Menozzi, 1939
- Camponotus crispulus Santschi, 1922
- †Camponotus crozei Riou, 1999
- Camponotus crucheti Santschi, 1911
- Camponotus cruentatus (Latreille, 1802)
- Camponotus ctenopilosus MacKay, 2025
- Camponotus cuauhtemoc Snelling, 1988
- Camponotus cubangensis Forel, 1901
- Camponotus cuneidorsus Emery, 1920
- Camponotus cuneiscapus Forel, 1910
- †Camponotus curviansatus Zhang, 1989
- Camponotus curviscapus Emery, 1896
- Camponotus cyrtomyrmodes Donisthorpe, 1941

== D ==
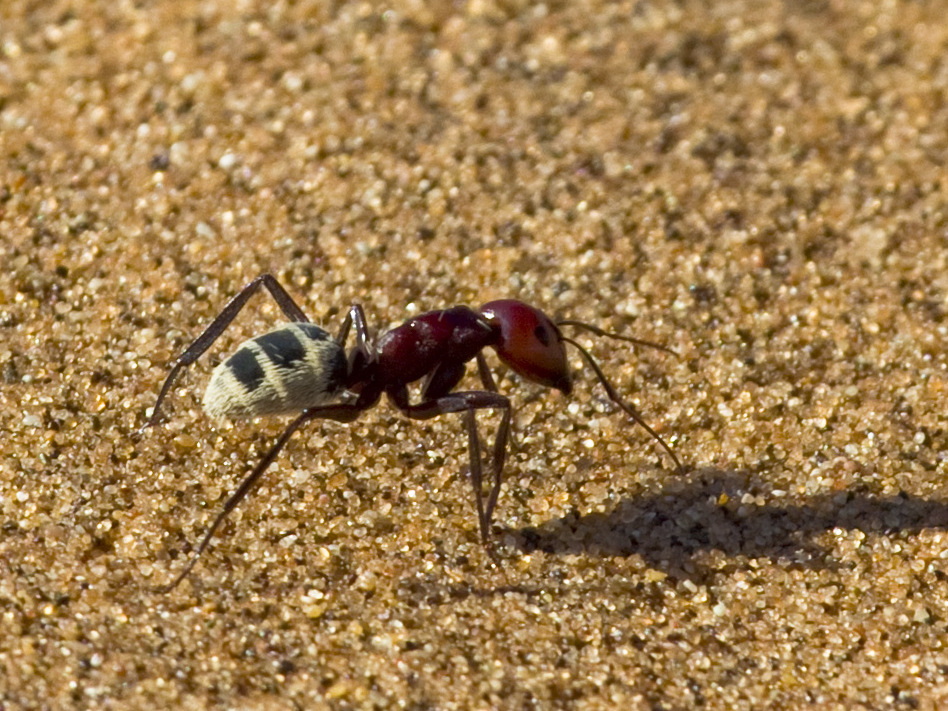
Camponotus detritus

- Camponotus daitoensis Terayama, 1999
- Camponotus dalmasi Forel, 1899
- Camponotus dalmaticus (Nylander, 1849)
- Camponotus daraina Rakotonirina & Fisher, 2022
- Camponotus darlingtoni Wheeler, 1934
- Camponotus darwinii Forel, 1886
- Camponotus debellator Santschi, 1926
- Camponotus decessor Forel, 1908
- Camponotus decipiens Emery, 1893
- Camponotus declivus Santschi, 1922
- Camponotus dedalus Forel, 1911
- Camponotus deletangi Santschi, 1920
- Camponotus densopilus Shattuck, 2005
- Camponotus depressiceps Forel, 1879
- Camponotus depressus Mayr, 1866
- Camponotus desantii Santschi, 1915
- Camponotus descarpentriesi Santschi, 1926
- Camponotus detritus Emery, 1886
- Camponotus devestivus Wheeler, 1928
- Camponotus dewitzii Forel, 1886
- Camponotus dicksoni Arnold, 1948
- Camponotus difformis Stitz, 1938
- Camponotus dimorphus Emery, 1894
- Camponotus diplopunctatus Emery, 1915
- Camponotus discolor (Buckley, 1866)
- Camponotus discors Forel, 1902
- Camponotus distinguendus (Spinola, 1851)
- Camponotus divergens Mayr, 1887
- Camponotus diversipalpus Santschi, 1922
- Camponotus dolabratus Menozzi, 1927
- Camponotus dolendus Forel, 1892
- Camponotus dolichoderoides Forel, 1911
- Camponotus donisthorpei Emery, 1920
- Camponotus donnellani Shattuck and McArthur, 2002
- Camponotus dorex Fisher, 2025
- Camponotus dorycus (Smith F., 1860)
- Camponotus dromas Santschi, 1919
- Camponotus dromedarius Forel, 1891
- Camponotus druryi Forel, 1886
- Camponotus dryandrae McArthur and Adams, 1996
- Camponotus dufouri Forel, 1891
- Camponotus dumetorum Wheeler., 1910
- Camponotus durnyx Fisher, 2025

== E ==
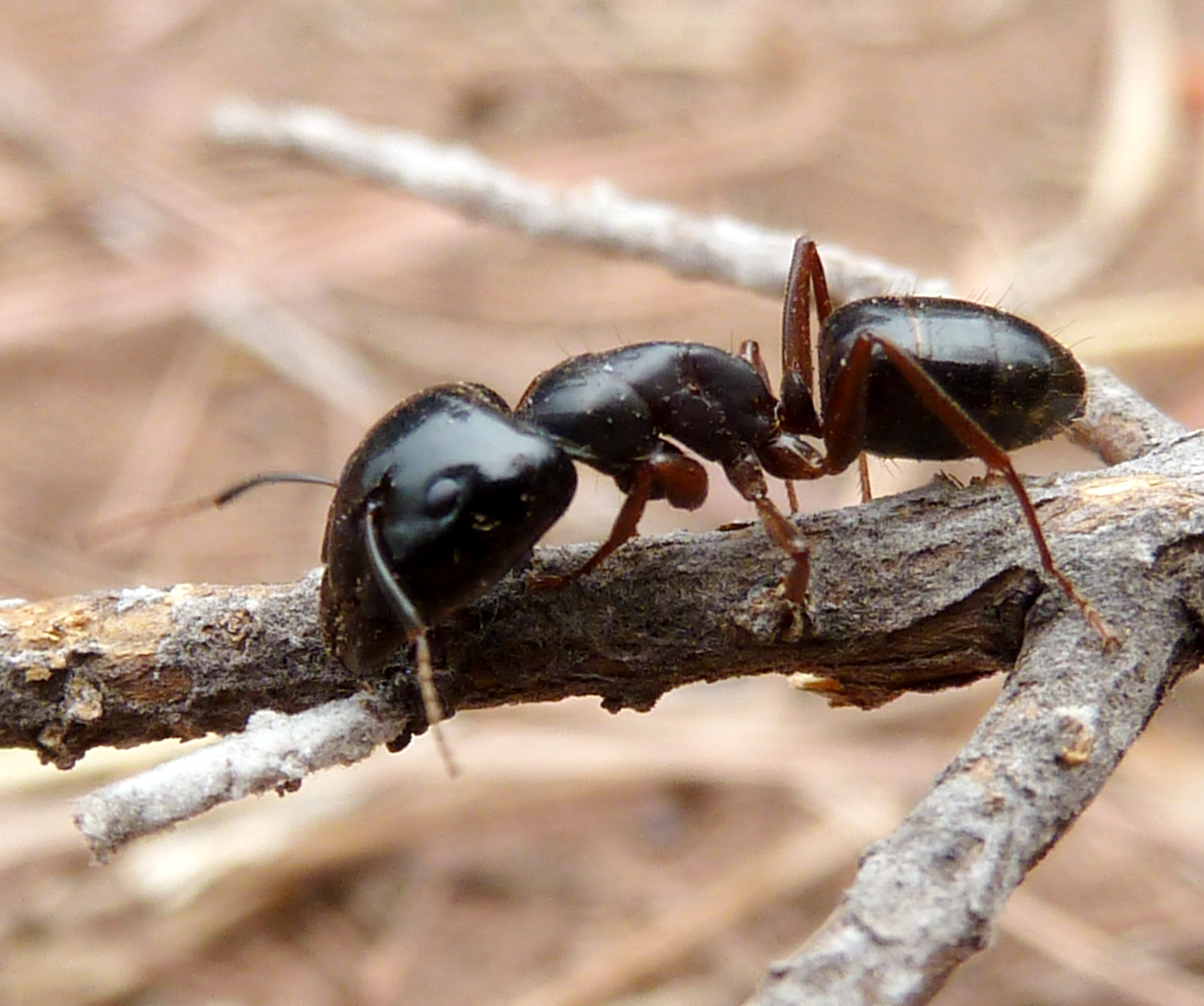
Camponotus empedocles

- Camponotus eastwoodi McArthur and Adams, 1996
- Camponotus ebneri Finzi, 1930
- Camponotus echinoploides Forel, 1891
- Camponotus edmondi Andre, 1887
- Camponotus efitra Rakotonirina et al., 2017
- Camponotus egregius (Smith F., 1858)
- Camponotus elegans Forel, 1902
- Camponotus elevatus Forel, 1899
- Camponotus ellioti Forel, 1891
- Camponotus emarginatus Emery, 1886
- Camponotus emeryodicatus Forel, 1901
- Camponotus empedocles Emery, 1920
- Camponotus enigmaticus MacKay, MacKay, & MacKay, 2004
- Camponotus eperiamorum Clouse, 2007
- Camponotus ephippiatus Viehmeyer, 1916
- Camponotus ephippium (Smith F., 1858)
- Camponotus eremicus Wheeler, 1915
- Camponotus erigens Forel, 1894
- Camponotus erinaceus Gerstacker, 1871
- Camponotus errabundus Arnold, 1949
- Camponotus erythrocephalus Clouse, 2007
- Camponotus erythrostoma Emery, 1920
- Camponotus esau Forel, 1915
- Camponotus essigi Smith, 1923
- Camponotus ethicus Forel, 1897
- Camponotus etiolipes Bolton, 1995
- Camponotus eugeniae Forel, 1879
- Camponotus eurynotus Forel, 1907
- Camponotus evae Forel, 1910
- Camponotus evansi Crawley, 1920
- Camponotus excisus Mayr, 1870
- Camponotus exiguoguttatus Forel, 1886
- Camponotus exsectus Emery, 1900
- Camponotus extensus Mayr, 1876
- Camponotus extraordinarius MacKay, 2025
- Camponotus ezotus Bolton, 1995

== F ==
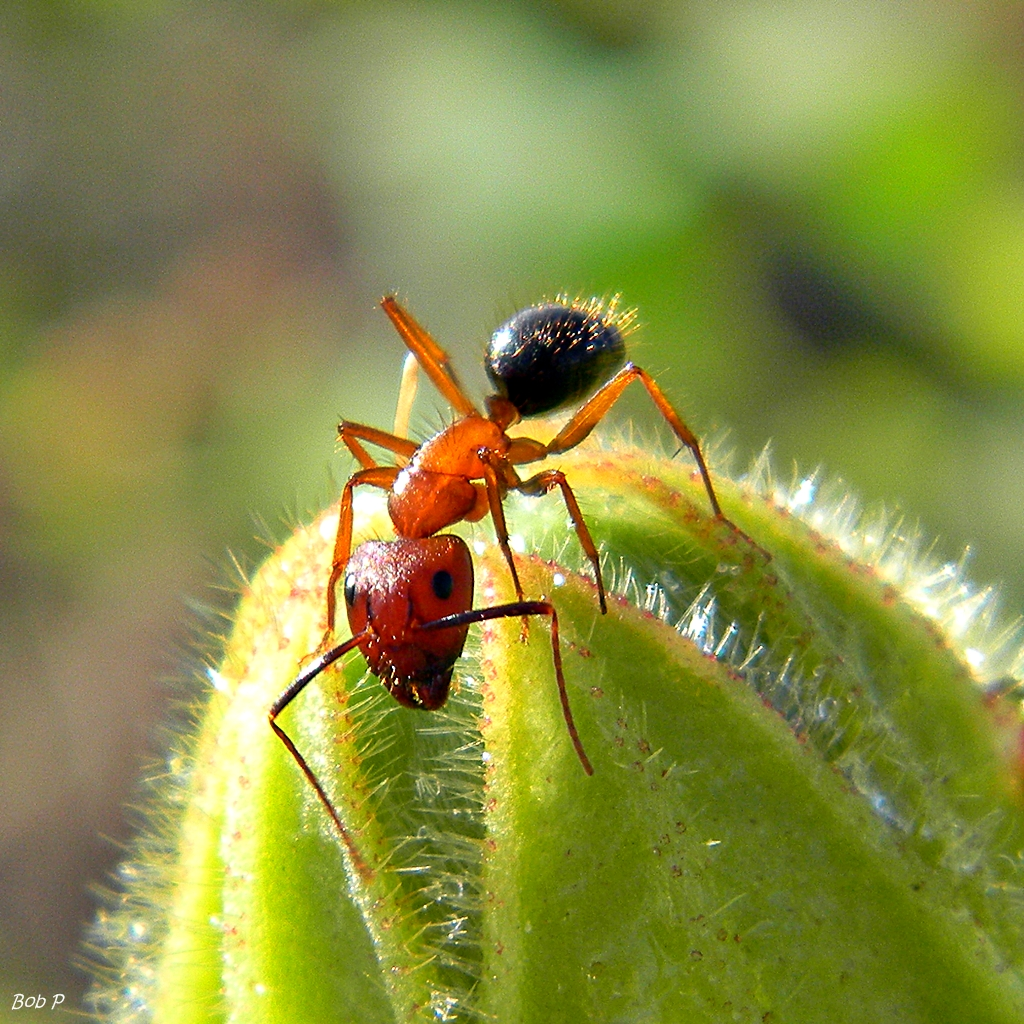
Camponotus floridanus

- Camponotus fabricator (Smith F., 1858)
- Camponotus falco Forel, 1902
- Camponotus fallatus Bolton, 1995
- Camponotus fallax (Nylander, 1856)
- Camponotus fasciatellus Dalla Torre, 1892
- Camponotus fasciatus (Mayr, 1867)
- Camponotus fastigatus Roger, 1863
- Camponotus favorabilis Santschi, 1919
- Camponotus fayfaensis Collingwood, 1985
- Camponotus feae Emery, 1882
- Camponotus fedtschenkoi Mayr, 1877
- Camponotus fellah Dalla Torre, 1893
- Camponotus femoratus (Fabricius, 1804)
- Camponotus fergusoni McArthur, 2003
- Camponotus fernandoi MacKay, 2025
- Camponotus ferreri Forel, 1913
- Camponotus fervidus Donisthorpe, 1943
- Camponotus festai Emery, 1894
- Camponotus festinatus (Buckley, 1866)
- Camponotus festinus (Smith F., 1857)
- Camponotus fiebrigi Forel, 1906
- Camponotus fieldeae Forel, 1902
- Camponotus fieldellus Forel, 1910
- Camponotus flavescens (Fabricius, 1793)
- Camponotus flavicomans Clouse, 2007
- Camponotus flavobregmus MacKay, 2025
- Camponotus flavocassis Donisthorpe, 1941
- Camponotus flavocrines Donisthorpe, 1941
- Camponotus flavomarginatus Mayr, 1862
- Camponotus fletcheri Donisthorpe, 1942
- Camponotus floridanus (Buckley, 1866)
- Camponotus florius Santschi, 1926
- Camponotus foersteri Forel, 1886
- Camponotus foleyi Santschi, 1939
- Camponotus folicola Forel, 1904
- Camponotus foraminosus Forel, 1879
- Camponotus foreli Emery, 1881
- Camponotus formiciformis Forel, 1885
- Camponotus formosensis Wheeler, 1927
- Camponotus fornasinii Emery, 1895
- Camponotus fragilis Pergande, 1893
- Camponotus franciscoi MacKay, 2025
- Camponotus fraseri McArthur, 2008
- Camponotus friedae Forel, 1912
- Camponotus froggatti Forel, 1902
- Camponotus frontalis Pergande, 1896
- Camponotus fryi Mann, 1916
- Camponotus fugax Forel, 1902
- Camponotus fulvopilosus (De Geer, 1778)
- Camponotus fumidus Roger, 1863
- Camponotus furvus Santschi, 1911
- Camponotus fuscivillosus Xiao and Wang, 1989
- Camponotus fuscocinctus Emery, 1888
- Camponotus fuscus Kim and Kim, 1994

== G ==
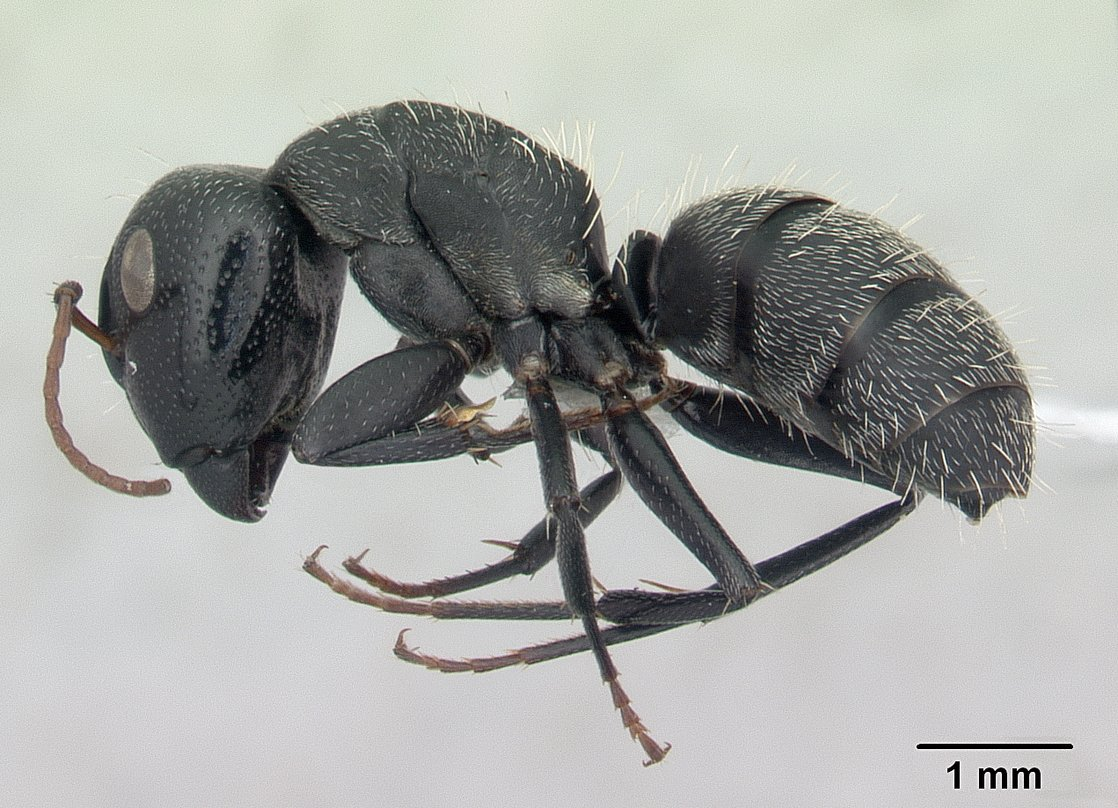
Camponotus grandidieri

- Camponotus gabonensis Santschi, 1926
- Camponotus galbinus MacKay, 2025
- Camponotus galla Forel, 1894
- Camponotus gallagheri Collingwood & Agosti, 1996
- Camponotus galoko Rakotonirina, Csösz & Fisher, 2016
- Camponotus gambeyi Emery, 1883
- Camponotus geayi Santschi, 1922
- Camponotus genatus Santschi, 1922
- Camponotus gentingensis Dumpert, 1995
- Camponotus germaini Emery, 1903
- Camponotus gestroi Emery, 1878
- Camponotus gibber Forel, 1891
- Camponotus gibbinotus Forel, 1902
- Camponotus gibbosus Karavaiev, 1929
- Camponotus gilviceps Roger, 1863
- Camponotus gilviventris Roger, 1863
- Camponotus glabrisquamis Emery, 1911
- Camponotus godmani Forel, 1899
- Camponotus goeldii Forel, 1894
- Camponotus gombaki Dumpert, 1986
- Camponotus gouldi Forel, 1886
- Camponotus gouldianus Forel, 1922
- Camponotus grandidieri Forel, 1886
- Camponotus greeni Forel, 1911
- Camponotus gretae Forel, 1902
- Camponotus guanchus Santschi, 1908
- Camponotus guatemalensis Forel, 1885
- Camponotus guayapa Kusnezov, 1952
- Camponotus guidae McArthur, 2007
- Camponotus guizhouensis Wang, 1992
- Camponotus gundlachi Mann, 1920
- Camponotus guttatus Emery, 1899

== H ==
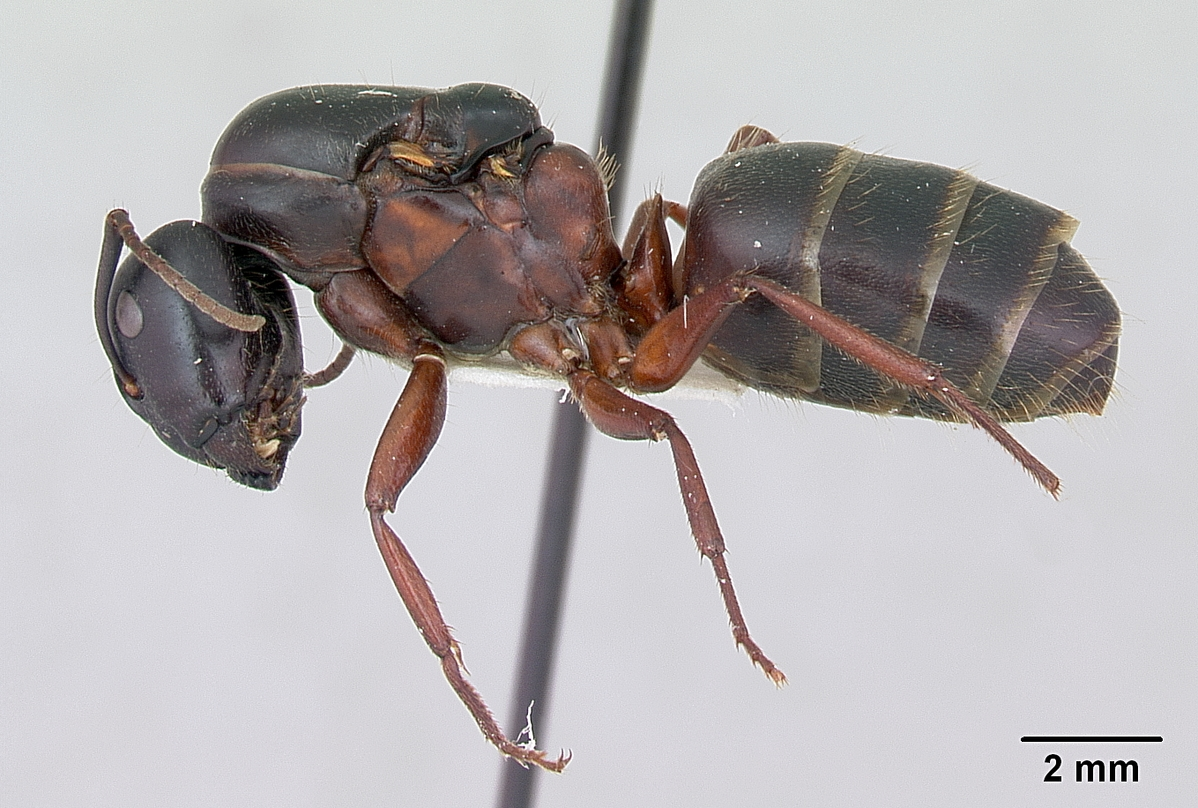
Camponotus herculeanus

- Camponotus habereri Forel, 1911
- Camponotus haematocephalus Emery, 1903
- Camponotus haereticus Santschi, 1914
- Camponotus hagensii Forel, 1886
- Camponotus hannani Forel, 1899
- Camponotus hapi Weber, 1943
- Camponotus harenarum Rakotonirina & Fisher, 2022
- Camponotus haroi Espadaler, 1997
- Camponotus hartogi Forel, 1902
- Camponotus hastifer Emery, 1911
- Camponotus havilandi Arnold, 1922
- Camponotus heathi Mann, 1916
- Camponotus hedwigae Forel, 1912
- Camponotus heidrunvogtae Seifert, 2019
- Camponotus helleri Emery, 1903
- Camponotus hellmichi Menozzi, 1935
- Camponotus helveolus MacKay, 2025
- Camponotus helvus Xiao & Wang, 1989
- Camponotus hemichlaena Yasumatsu & Brown, 1951
- Camponotus herculeanus (Linnaeus, 1758)
- Camponotus hermanni Emery, 1911
- Camponotus heros Santschi, 1926
- Camponotus hesperius Emery, 1893
- Camponotus heteroclitus Forel, 1895
- Camponotus hildebrandti Forel, 1886
- Camponotus himalayanus Forel, 1893
- Camponotus hippocrepis Emery, 1920
- Camponotus hirtus Karaman & Aktaç, 2013
- Camponotus hispidus Emery, 1906
- Camponotus hoelldobleri Cagniant, 1991
- Camponotus holosericeus Emery, 1889
- Camponotus holzi Forel, 1921
- Camponotus honaziensis Karaman & Aktaç, 2013
- Camponotus hoplites Emery, 1914
- Camponotus horrens Forel, 1910
- Camponotus horseshoetus Datta & Raychaudhuri, 1985
- Camponotus hospes (Emery, 1884)
- Camponotus hova Forel, 1891
- Camponotus hovahovoides Forel, 1892
- Camponotus humeralis Emery, 1920
- Camponotus humerus Wang & Wu, 1994
- Camponotus humilior Forel, 1902
- Camponotus husseini Dietrich, 2004
- Camponotus hyalus França et al., 2024
- Camponotus hyatti Emery, 1893
- Camponotus hypoclineoides Wheeler, 1919

== I ==
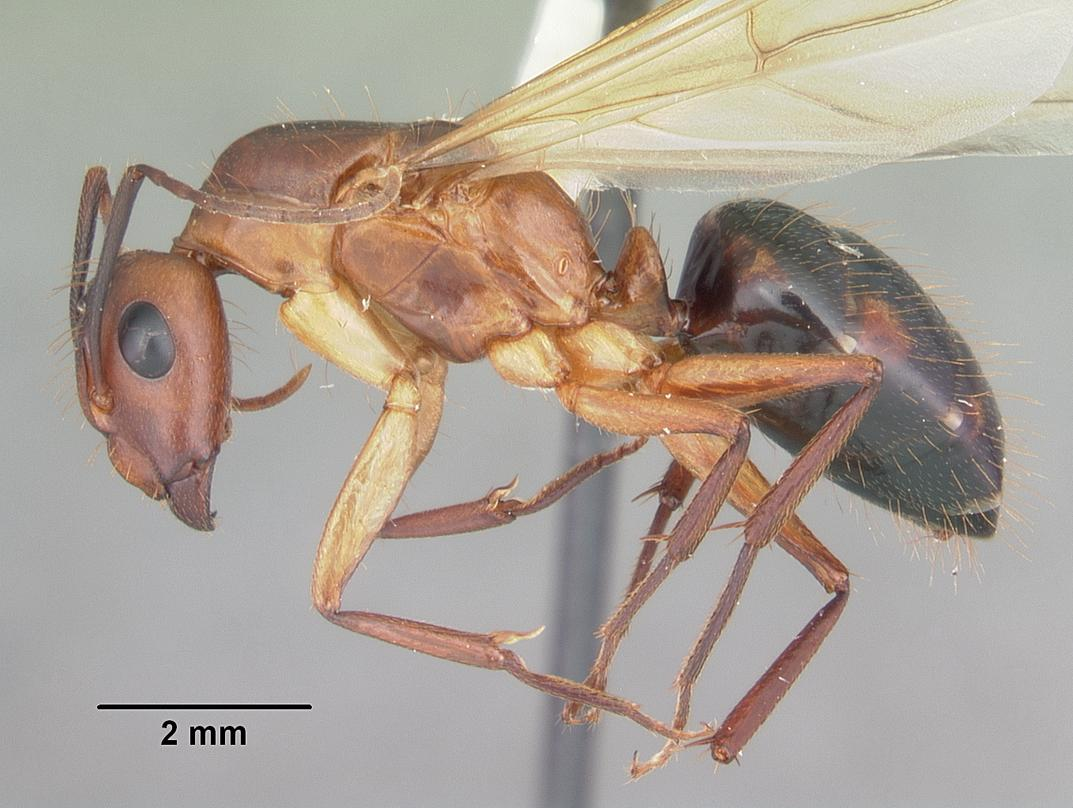
Camponotus inaequalis alate queen

- Camponotus icarus Forel, 1912
- Camponotus ignestii Menozzi, 1935
- Camponotus ihazofotsy Rasoamanana & Fisher, 2022
- Camponotus iheringi Forel, 1908
- Camponotus ilgii Forel, 1894
- Camponotus imitator Forel, 1891
- Camponotus immaculatus Forel, 1892
- Camponotus immigrans Santschi, 1914
- Camponotus importunus Forel, 1911
- Camponotus impressilabris Stitz, 1938
- Camponotus improprius (Forel, 1879)
- Camponotus inaequalis Roger, 1863
- Camponotus inca Emery, 1903
- Camponotus incensus Wheeler, 1932
- Camponotus inconspicuus Mayr, 1872
- Camponotus indefinitus Karavaiev, 1929
- Camponotus indeflexus (Walker, 1859)
- Camponotus indianus Forel, 1879
- Camponotus indicatus Santschi, 1922
- Camponotus inflatus Lubbock, 1880
- Camponotus innexus Forel, 1902
- Camponotus innocens Forel, 1909
- Camponotus inquilinus Zettel & Laciny, 2018
- Camponotus insipidus Forel, 1893
- Camponotus integellus Forel, 1899
- Camponotus interjectus Mayr, 1877
- Camponotus intrepidus (Kirby W., 1819)
- Camponotus inverallensis Forel, 1910
- Camponotus invidus Forel, 1892
- Camponotus ionius Emery, 1920
- Camponotus iridis Santschi, 1922
- Camponotus irritabilis (Smith F., 1857)
- Camponotus irritans (Smith F., 1857)
- Camponotus isabellae Forel, 1909
- Camponotus itoi Forel, 1912
- Camponotus ivadia Rasoamanana & Fisher, 2022
- Camponotus iwoensis Terayama & Kubota, 2011

== J ==
- Camponotus jaliensis Dalla Torre, 1893
- Camponotus janeti Forel, 1895
- Camponotus janforrestae McArthur & Shattuck, 2001
- Camponotus japonicus Mayr, 1866
- Camponotus javaensis Ward et al., 2016
- Camponotus jeanneli Santschi, 1914
- Camponotus jejuensis Kim & Kim, 1986
- Camponotus jianghuaensis Xiao & Wang, 1989
- Camponotus jjacquia Rasoamanana & Fisher, 2022
- Camponotus joany Rakotonirina & Fisher, 2022
- Camponotus jodina Rasoamanana, Csösz & Fisher, 2017
- Camponotus johnclarki Taylor, 1992
- Camponotus johnsoni Mackay, 2019
- Camponotus judithmorrisae McArthur, 2008
- Camponotus juliae Emery, 1903

== K ==
- Camponotus kaguya Terayama, 1999
- Camponotus karaha Rasoamanana et al., 2017
- Camponotus karsti Rakotonirina & Fisher, 2022
- Camponotus kattensis Bingham, 1903
- Camponotus kaura Snelling & Torres, 1998
- Camponotus kefir Ionescu-Hirsch, 2010
- Camponotus keiferi Wheeler, 1934
- Camponotus kelimaso Rakotonirina & Fisher, 2022
- Camponotus keralensis Karmaly & Narendran, 2006
- Camponotus kersteni Gerstacker, 1871
- Camponotus khaosokensis Dumpert, 2006
- Camponotus kiesenwetteri (Roger, 1859)
- Camponotus kiusiuensis Santschi, 1937
- Camponotus klaesii (Forel, 1886)
- Camponotus klugii Emery, 1895
- Camponotus knysnae Arnold, 1922
- Camponotus kollbrunneri Forel, 1910
- Camponotus kolthoffi Stitz, 1934
- Camponotus kopetdaghensis Dlussky & Zabelin, 1985
- Camponotus korthalsiae Emery, 1887
- Camponotus koseritzi Emery, 1888
- Camponotus kraepelini Forel, 1901
- Camponotus kubaryi Mayr, 1876
- Camponotus kunigamiensis Terayama, 2013
- Camponotus kurdistanicus Emery, 1898
- Camponotus kutteri Forel, 1915
- Camponotus kutterianus Baroni Urbani, 1972

== L ==
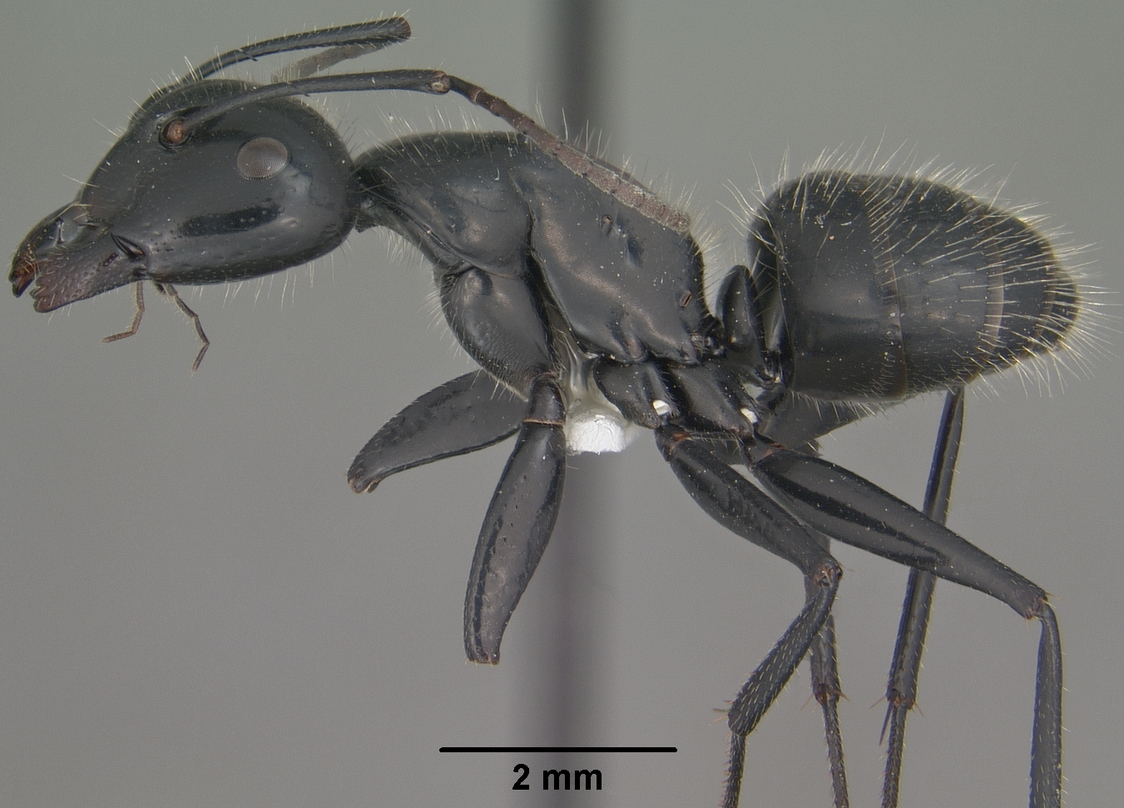
Camponotus laevigatus

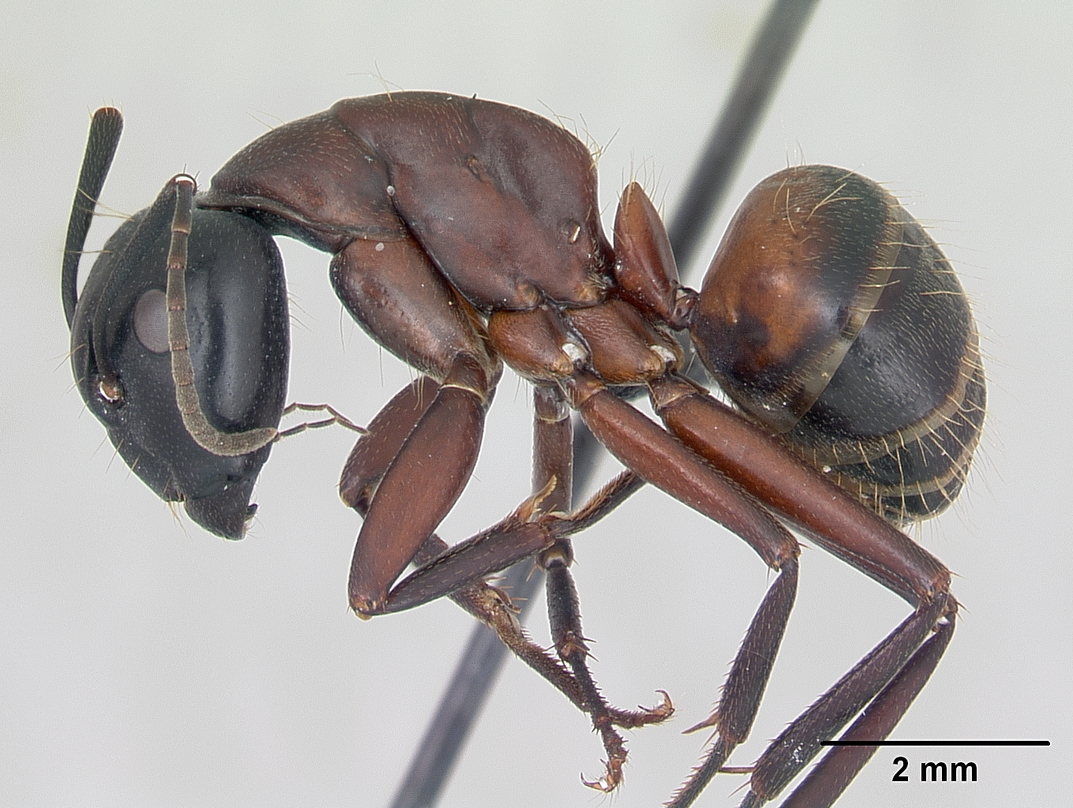
Camponotus ligniperda

- Camponotus laconicus Emery, 1920
- Camponotus laeviceps MacKay, 2025
- Camponotus laevigatus (Smith F., 1858)
- Camponotus laevissimus Mackay, 2019
- Camponotus lamarckii Forel, 1892
- Camponotus lamborni Donisthorpe, 1933
- Camponotus lameerei Emery, 1898
- Camponotus lamosy Rakotonirina & Fisher, 2018
- Camponotus lancifer Emery, 1894
- Camponotus landolti Forel, 1879
- Camponotus langi Wheeler, 1922
- Camponotus largiceps Wu & Wang, 1989
- Camponotus lasiselene Wang & Wu, 1994
- Camponotus latangulus Roger, 1863
- Camponotus latebrosus (Walker, 1859)
- Camponotus lateralis (Olivier, 1792)
- Camponotus latidorsalis MacKay, 2025
- Camponotus laurenti Santschi, 1939
- Camponotus leae Wheeler, 1915
- Camponotus lenkoi Kempf, 1960
- Camponotus leptocephalus Emery, 1923
- Camponotus lespesii Forel, 1886
- Camponotus leucodiscus Wheeler, 1919
- Camponotus leucophaeus (Smith F., 1861)
- Camponotus leveillei Emery, 1895
- Camponotus leydigi Forel, 1886
- Camponotus liandia Rakotonirina & Fisher, 2018
- Camponotus libanicus Andre, 1881
- Camponotus ligeus Donisthorpe, 1931
- Camponotus lighti Wheeler, 1927
- Camponotus ligniperda (Latreille, 1802)
- Camponotus lilianae Forel, 1913
- Camponotus limbiventris Santschi, 1911
- Camponotus lindigi Mayr, 1870
- Camponotus linnaei Forel, 1886
- Camponotus liogaster Santschi, 1932
- Camponotus lividicoxis Viehmeyer, 1925
- Camponotus lividipes Emery, 1887
- Camponotus lokobe Rakotonirina & Fisher, 2022
- Camponotus longicephalus MacKay, 2025
- Camponotus longiceps (Smith F., 1863)
- Camponotus longicollis Rasoamanana, Csösz & Fisher, 2017
- Camponotus longideclivis McArthur & Adams, 1996
- Camponotus longifacies McArthur, 2003
- Camponotus longipalpis Santschi, 1926
- Camponotus longipilis Emery, 1911
- Camponotus loweryi McArthur & Adams, 1996
- Camponotus lownei Forel, 1895
- Camponotus lubbocki Forel, 1886
- Camponotus lucayanus Wheeler, 1905
- Camponotus luctuosus (Smith F., 1858)
- Camponotus luteiventris Emery, 1897
- Camponotus luteus (Smith F., 1858)
- Camponotus lutzi Forel, 1905

== M ==
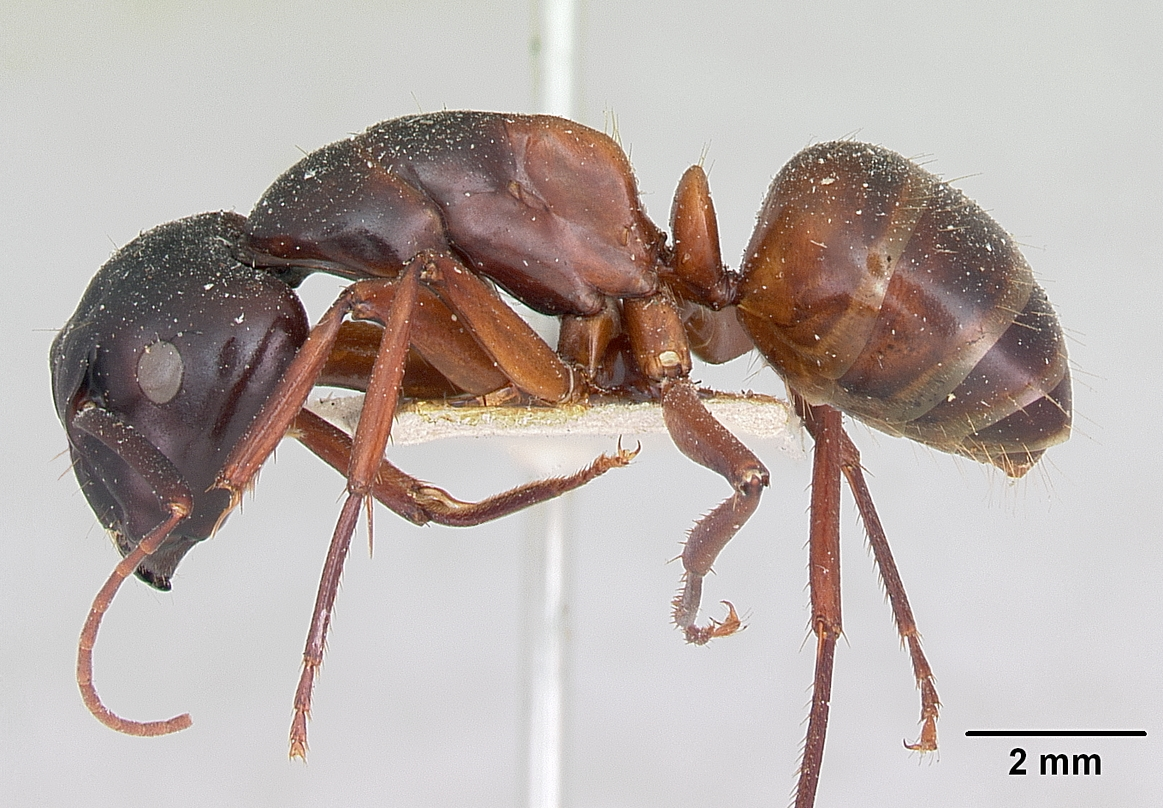
Camponotus maccooki

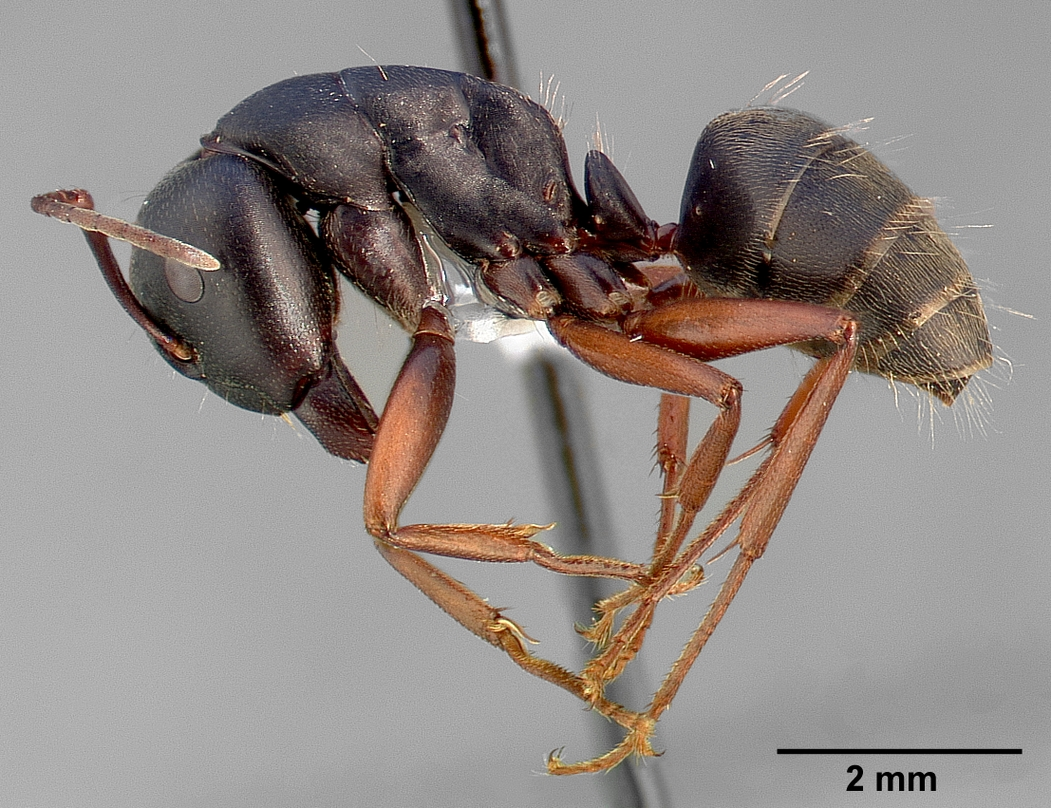
Camponotus modoc

- Camponotus macareaveyi Taylor, 1992
- Camponotus maccooki Forel, 1879
- Camponotus macilentus Smith F., 1877
- Camponotus mackayensis Forel, 1902
- Camponotus macrocephalus Emery, 1894
- Camponotus macrochaeta Emery, 1903
- Camponotus macromischoides Fontenla Rizo, 1997
- Camponotus maculatus (Fabricius, 1782)
- Camponotus maculiventris Emery, 1895
- Camponotus madagascarensis Forel, 1886
- Camponotus magister Santschi, 1925
- Camponotus maguassa Wheeler, 1922
- Camponotus mahafaly Rakotonirina & Fisher, 2022
- Camponotus maintikibo Rakotonirina et al., 2017
- Camponotus maintilany Rasoamanana & Fisher, 2022
- Camponotus mainty Rakotonirina & Fisher, 2018
- Camponotus malleensis McArthur, 2007
- Camponotus manabo Rakotonirina & Fisher, 2018
- Camponotus marcens Forel, 1907
- Camponotus marianensis Clouse, 2007
- Camponotus maritimus Ward, 2005
- Camponotus maschwitzi Dumpert, 2006
- Camponotus massinissa Wheeler, 1922
- Camponotus matsilo Rakotonirina, Csösz & Fisher, 2016
- Camponotus maxwellensis Forel, 1913
- Camponotus maynei Forel, 1916
- Camponotus mayri Forel, 1879
- Camponotus medeus Emery, 1920
- Camponotus medianus MacKay, 2025
- Camponotus megalonyx Wheeler, 1919
- Camponotus meghalayaensis Dhadwal & Bharti, 2023
- Camponotus melanocephalus Roger, 1863
- Camponotus melanoticus Emery, 1894
- Camponotus melanus Dumpert, 1995
- Camponotus melichloros Kirby, 1889
- Camponotus mendax Forel, 1895
- Camponotus micans (Nylander, 1856)
- Camponotus michaelseni Forel, 1907
- Camponotus micragyne Dumpert, 1995
- Camponotus micronesicus Blanchard & Clouse, 2016
- Camponotus microps Snelling, R.R., 2006
- Camponotus micrositus Wheeler, 1937
- Camponotus mifaka Rakotonirina, Csösz & Fisher, 2016
- Camponotus mina Forel, 1879
- Camponotus minozzii Emery, 1920
- Camponotus minus Wang & Wu, 1994
- Camponotus mirabilis Emery, 1903
- Camponotus misturus (Smith F., 1857)
- Camponotus mita Rakotonirina et al., 2017
- Camponotus mitis (Smith F., 1858)
- Camponotus mixtellus Dalla Torre, 1893
- Camponotus mocquerysi Emery, 1899
- Camponotus mocsaryi Forel, 1902
- Camponotus moderatus Santschi, 1930
- Camponotus modoc Wheeler, 1910
- Camponotus moelleri Forel, 1912
- Camponotus molossus Forel, 1907
- Camponotus mombassae Forel, 1886
- Camponotus monardi Santschi, 1930
- Camponotus monju Terayama, 1999
- Camponotus morosus (Smith F., 1858)
- Camponotus mozabensis Emery, 1899
- Camponotus mucronatus Emery, 1890
- Camponotus mus Roger, 1863
- Camponotus mussolinii Donisthorpe, 1936
- Camponotus mutilarius Emery, 1893
- Camponotus mystaceus Emery, 1886

== N ==
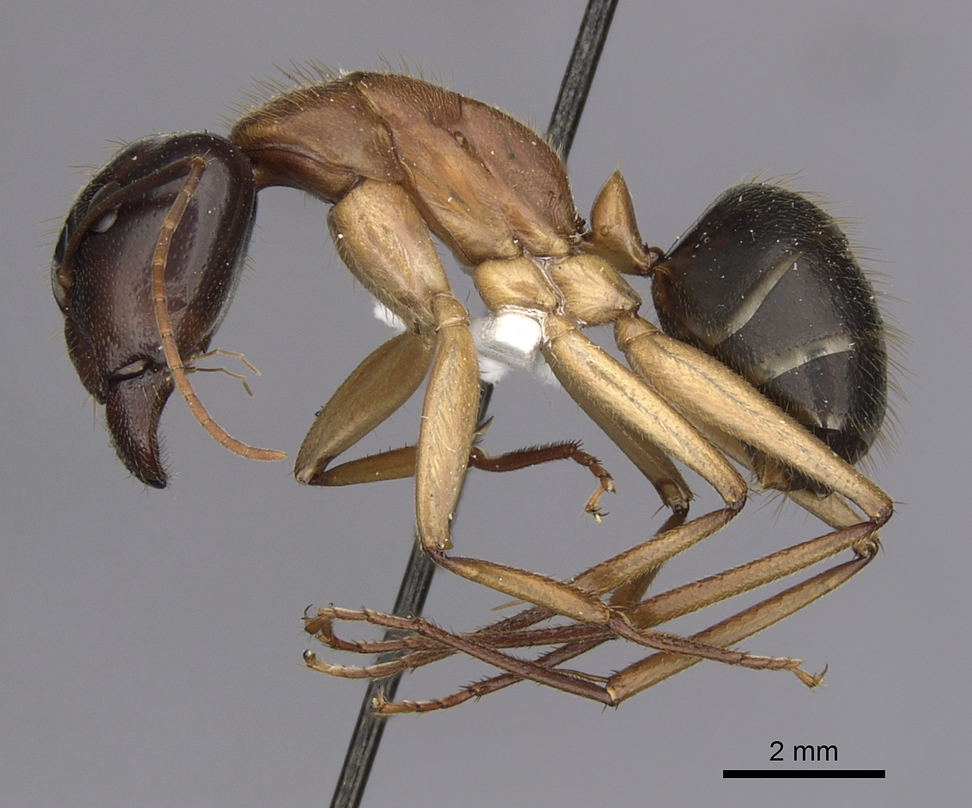
Camponotus nigriceps

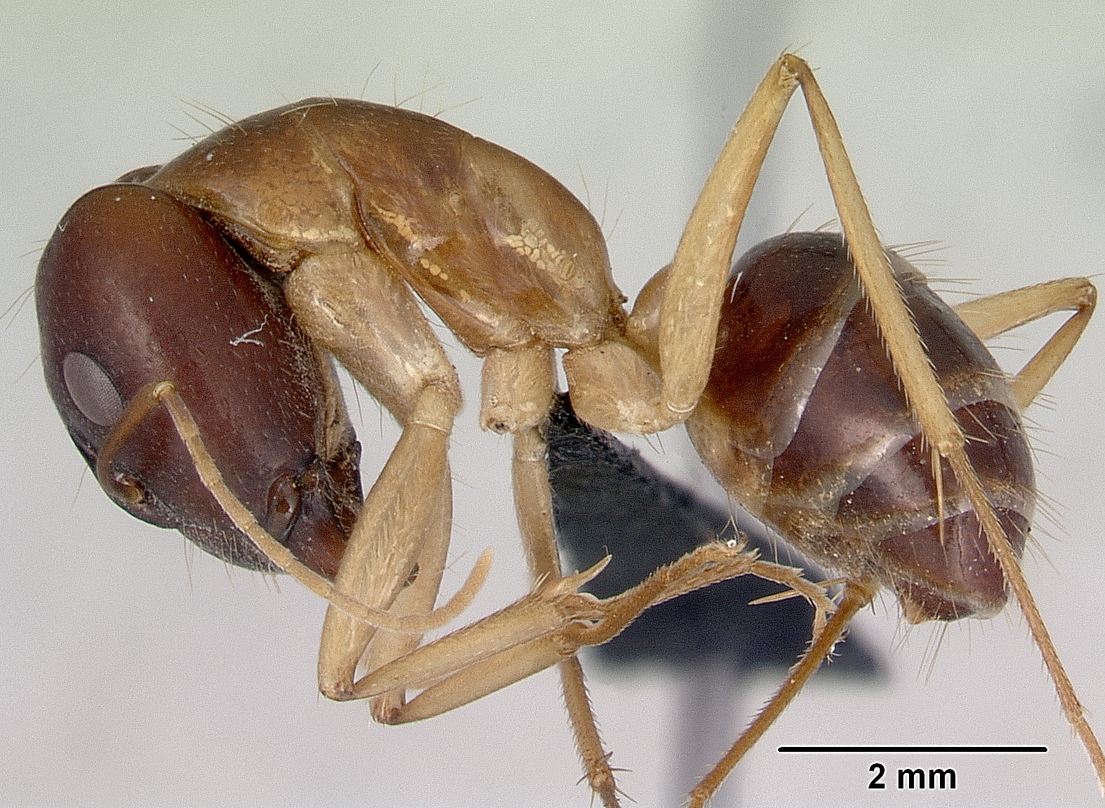
Camponotus novaehollandiae

- Camponotus nacerdus Norton, 1868
- Camponotus naegelii Forel, 1879
- Camponotus namacola Prins, 1973
- Camponotus nasicus Forel, 1891
- Camponotus nasutus Emery, 1895
- Camponotus natalensis (Smith F., 1858)
- Camponotus navigator Wilson & Taylor, 1967
- Camponotus nawai Ito, 1914
- Camponotus nearcticus Emery, 1893
- Camponotus nepos Forel, 1912
- Camponotus niavo Rakotonirina & Fisher, 2022
- Camponotus nicobarensis Mayr, 1865
- Camponotus nidulans (Smith F., 1860)
- Camponotus nigricans Roger, 1863
- Camponotus nigriceps (Smith F., 1858)
- Camponotus nigroaeneus (Smith F., 1858)
- Camponotus nigronitidus Azuma, 1951
- Camponotus nipponensis Santschi, 1937
- Camponotus nirvanae Forel, 1893
- Camponotus nitens Mayr, 1870
- Camponotus nitidescens Forel, 1889
- Camponotus nitidior (Santschi, 1921)
- Camponotus nitidus (Smith, 1859)
- Camponotus niveosetosus Mayr, 1862
- Camponotus nixra Fisher, 2025
- Camponotus normatus Forel, 1899
- Camponotus norvigi Rasoamanana & Fisher, 2022
- Camponotus nosibeensis Andre, 1887
- Camponotus novaeboracensis (Fitch, 1855)
- Camponotus novaehollandiae Mayr, 1870
- Camponotus noveboracensis (Fitch, 1854)
- Camponotus novogranadensis Mayr, 1870
- Camponotus nylanderi Emery, 1921
- Camponotus nywet Bolton, 1995

== O ==
- Camponotus oasium Forel, 1890
- Camponotus oblongus (Smith, 1858)
- Camponotus obreptivus Forel, 1899
- Camponotus obscuripes Mayr, 1879
- Camponotus obscuriventris Cagniant, 1991
- Camponotus obtritus Emery, 1911
- Camponotus occasus Emery, 1920
- Camponotus ocreatus Emery, 1893
- Camponotus oculatior Santschi, 1935
- Camponotus odiosus Forel, 1886
- Camponotus oertzeni Forel, 1889
- Camponotus oetkeri Forel, 1910
- Camponotus ogasawarensis Terayama & Satoh, 1990
- Camponotus olivieri Forel, 1886
- Camponotus ominosus Forel, 1911
- Camponotus opaciceps Roger, 1863
- Camponotus opaciventris Mayr, 1879
- Camponotus orinobates Santschi, 1919
- Camponotus orinus Dumpert, 1995
- Camponotus orites Santschi, 1919
- Camponotus orombe Rakotonirina, Csösz & Fisher, 2016
- Camponotus orthodoxus Santschi, 1914
- Camponotus ostiarius Forel, 1914
- Camponotus ovaticeps (Spinola, 1851)
- Camponotus overbecki Viehmeyer, 1916
- Camponotus owensae Shattuck & McArthur, 2002
- Camponotus oxleyi Forel, 1902

== P ==
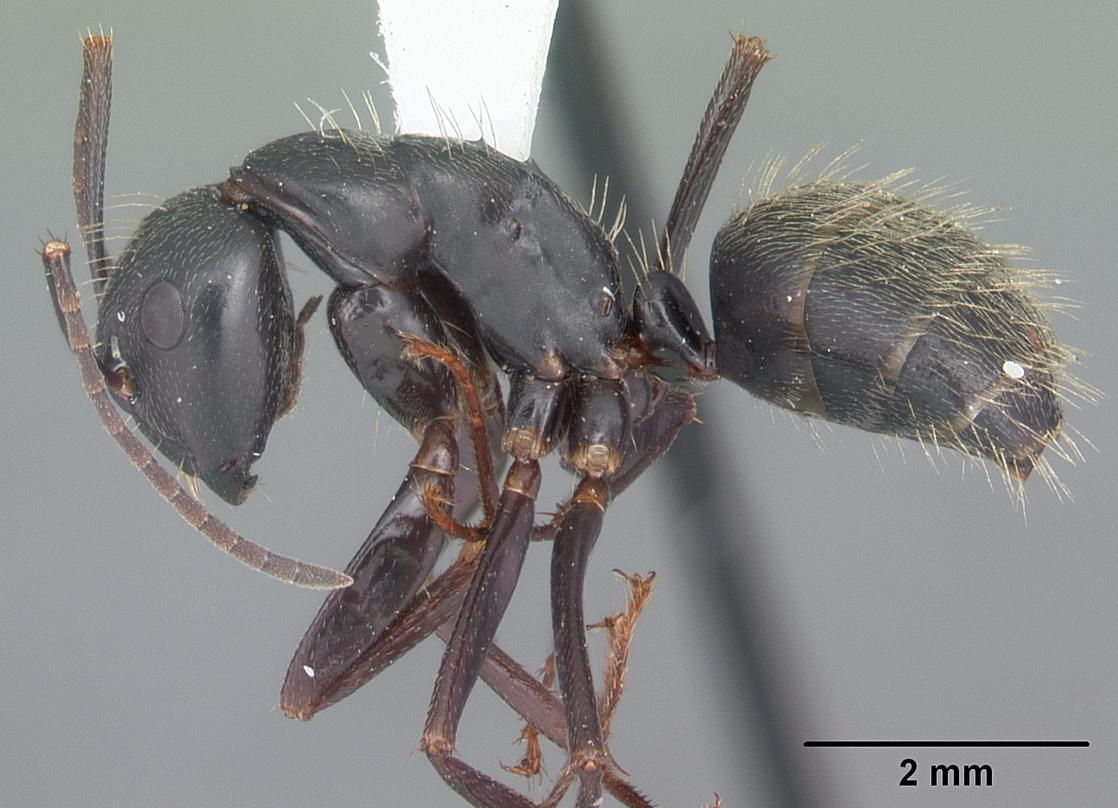
Camponotus pennsylvanicus

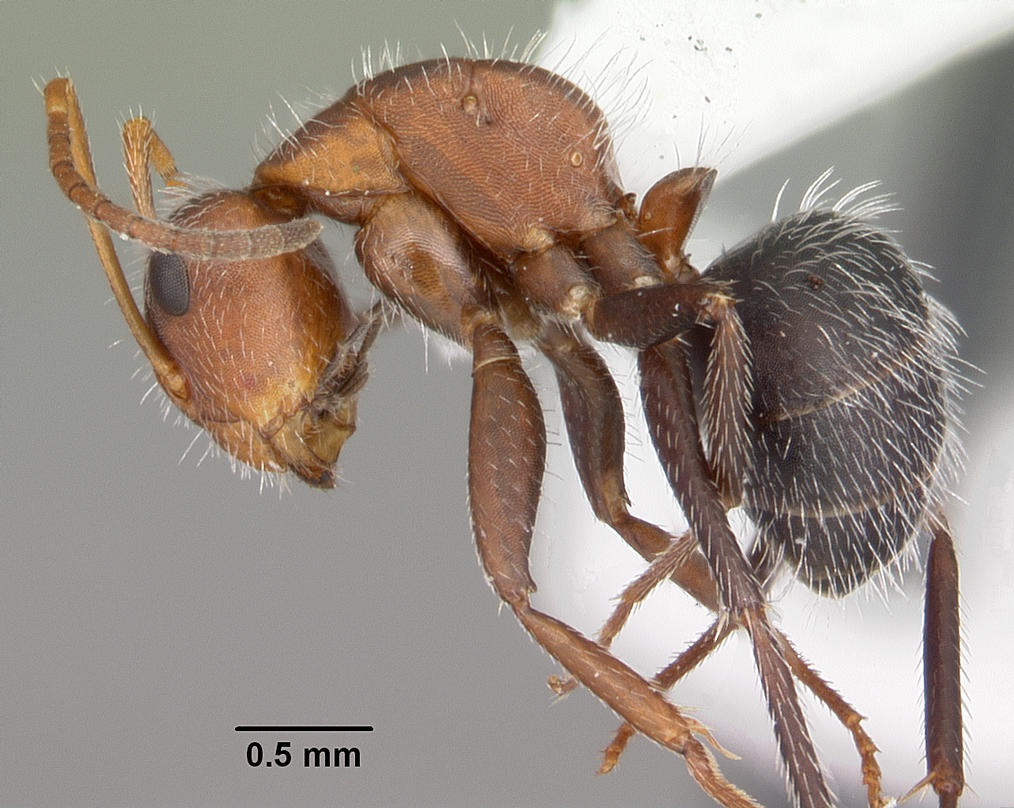
Camponotus planatus

- Camponotus pachylepis Emery, 1920
- Camponotus palkura McArthur, 2007
- Camponotus pallens (Le Guillou, 1842)
- Camponotus pallescens Mayr, 1887
- Camponotus pallidiceps Emery, 1887
- Camponotus palmyrensis Tohme & Tohme, 2000
- Camponotus palpatus Emery, 1897
- Camponotus panamensis Fernandez, 2002
- Camponotus parabarbatus Bharti & Wachkoo, 2014
- Camponotus paracolobopsis Zettel & Yamane, 2018
- Camponotus paracressoni MacKay, 2025
- Camponotus paradoxus (Mayr, 1866)
- Camponotus paraleonardi Zettel & Yamane, 2018
- Camponotus parius Emery, 1889
- †Camponotus parvus Perfilieva, 2022
- Camponotus patawa MacKay, 2025
- Camponotus patimae Wheeler, 1942
- Camponotus patriciae MacKay, 2025
- Camponotus pavidus (Smith, 1860)
- Camponotus pawseyi McArthur, 2003
- Camponotus peleliuensis Clouse, 2007
- Camponotus pellarius Wheeler, 1914
- Camponotus pellax Santschi, 1919
- Camponotus pellitus Mayr, 1862
- Camponotus pennsylvanicus (De Geer, 1773)
- Camponotus peperi Forel, 1913
- Camponotus perjurus Shattuck & McArthur, 2002
- Camponotus perrisii Forel, 1886
- Camponotus personatus Emery, 1894
- Camponotus peseshus Bolton, 1995
- Camponotus petersii Emery, 1895
- Camponotus pexus Santschi, 1929
- Camponotus philippinensis (Zettel & Zimmermann, 2007)
- Camponotus philwardi McArthur, 2008
- Camponotus phytophilus Wheeler, 1934
- Camponotus piceatus Norton, 1868
- Camponotus piceus (Leach, 1825)
- Camponotus picipes (Olivier, 1792)
- Camponotus pictostriatus Karavaiev, 1933
- Camponotus pilicornis (Roger, 1859)
- Camponotus piliventris (Smith, 1858)
- Camponotus pitjantjatarae McArthur, 2003
- Camponotus pittieri Forel, 1899
- Camponotus placidus (Smith, 1858)
- Camponotus planatus Roger, 1863
- Camponotus planitae Santschi, 1929
- Camponotus planus Smith, 1877
- Camponotus platypus Roger, 1863
- Camponotus platytarsus Roger, 1863
- Camponotus plutus Santschi, 1922
- Camponotus poecilus Emery, 1893
- Camponotus politae (Wu & Wang, 1994)
- Camponotus polymorphicus MacKay, Lopez-Castro & Fernandez, 2002
- Camponotus polyrhachioides Mackay et al., 2002
- Camponotus pompeius Forel, 1886
- Camponotus postangulatus Emery, 1911
- Camponotus postcornutus Clark, 1930
- Camponotus posteropilus Shattuck, 2005
- Camponotus posticus Santschi, 1926
- Camponotus postoculatus Forel, 1914
- Camponotus praegracilis Karaman & Kiran, 2017
- Camponotus pressipes Emery, 1893
- Camponotus propinquellus Emery, 1920
- Camponotus propinquus Mayr, 1887
- Camponotus prosseri Shattuck & McArthur, 2002
- Camponotus prostans Forel, 1910
- Camponotus prosulcatus Santschi, 1935
- Camponotus pseudoirritans Wu & Wang, 1989
- Camponotus pseudolendus Wu & Wang, 1989
- Camponotus puberulus Emery, 1897
- Camponotus pudorosus Emery, 1925
- Camponotus pulchellus Forel, 1894
- Camponotus pulcher Forel, 1892
- Camponotus pullatus Mayr, 1866
- Camponotus pulvinatus Mayr, 1907
- Camponotus punctaticeps (Mayr, 1867)
- Camponotus punctatissimus Forel, 1907
- Camponotus punctatus Forel, 1912
- Camponotus punctiventris Emery, 1920
- Camponotus punctulatus Mayr, 1868
- Camponotus puniceps Donisthorpe, 1942
- Camponotus pupillus Santschi, 1939
- Camponotus putatus Forel, 1892

== Q ==
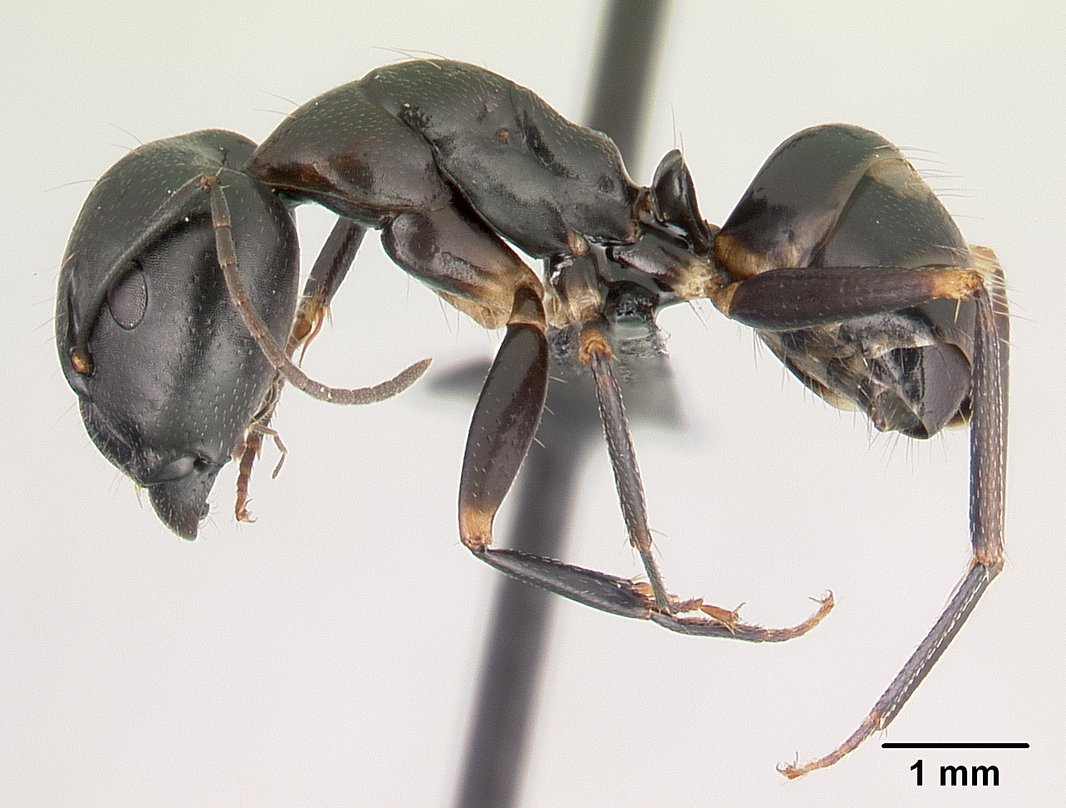
Camponotus quadrimaculatus

- Camponotus quadrimaculatus Forel, 1886
- Camponotus quadrinotatus Forel, 1886
- Camponotus quadrisectus (Smith F., 1858)

== R ==
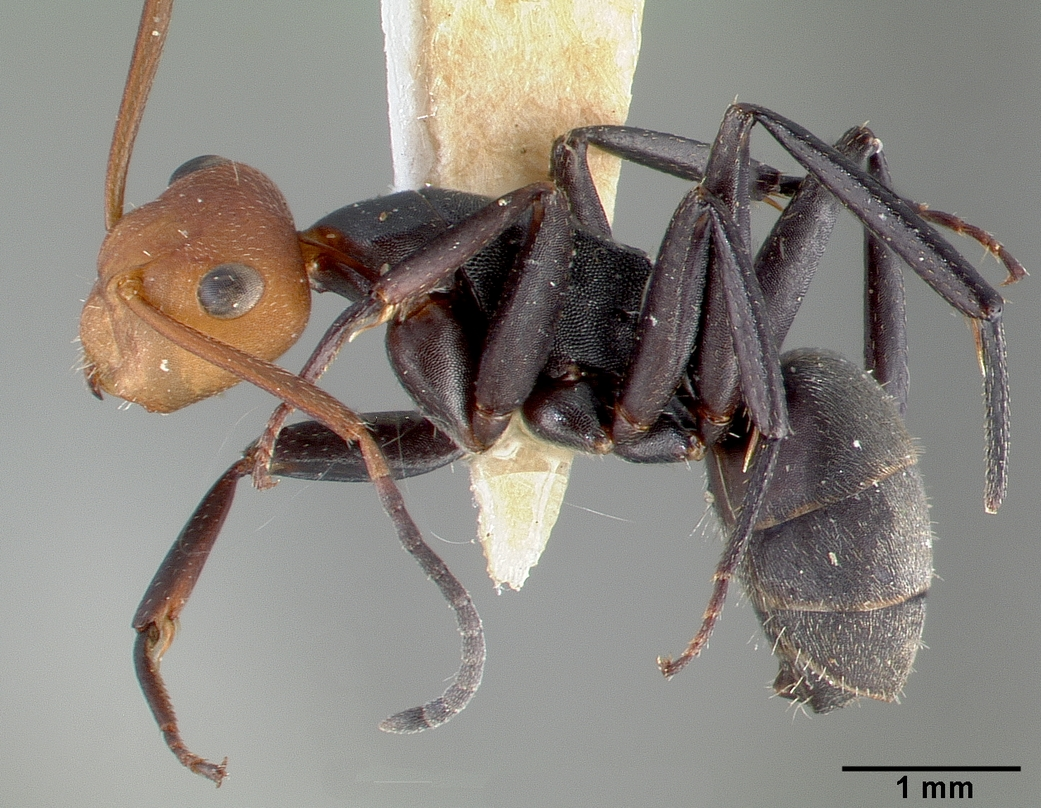
Camponotus rectangularis

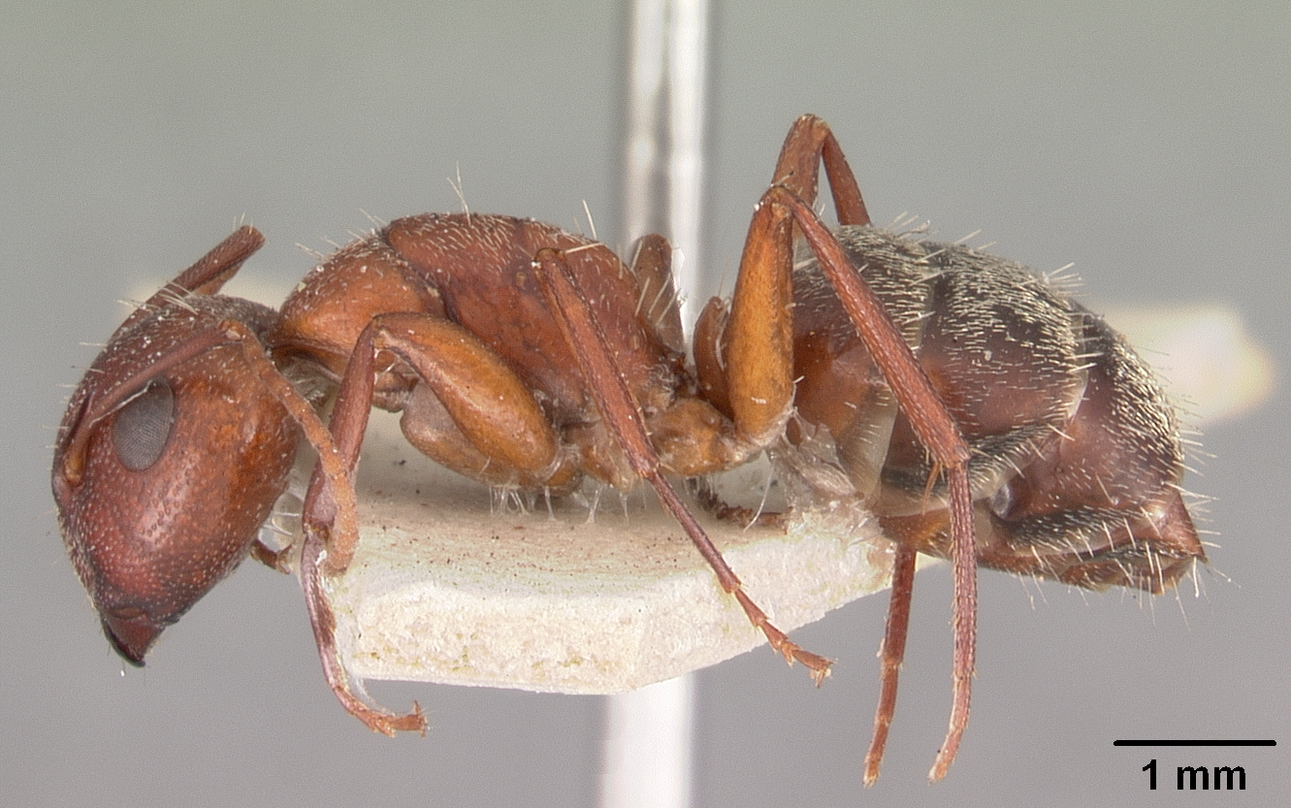
Camponotus robecchii

- Camponotus radamae Forel, 1891
- Camponotus radiatus Forel, 1892
- Camponotus radovae Forel, 1886
- Camponotus raina Rakotonirina & Fisher, 2018
- Camponotus ramulorum Wheeler, 1905
- Camponotus rapax (Fabricius, 1804)
- Camponotus raphaelis Forel, 1899
- Camponotus reaumuri Forel, 1892
- Camponotus rebeccae Forel, 1913
- Camponotus reburrus Mackay, 2013
- Camponotus rectangularis Emery, 1890
- Camponotus reevei Arnold, 1922
- Camponotus reichardti Arnol’di, 1967
- Camponotus reinaldi Kempf, 1960
- Camponotus renggeri Emery, 1894
- Camponotus repens Forel, 1897
- Camponotus reticulatus Roger, 1863
- Camponotus rhamses Santschi, 1915
- Camponotus riedeli Pisarski, 1971
- Camponotus robecchii Emery, 1892
- Camponotus robertae Santschi, 1926
- Camponotus robustus Roger, 1863
- Camponotus rodriguezi MacKay, 2025
- Camponotus roeseli Forel, 1910
- Camponotus rosariensis Forel, 1912
- Camponotus rotrae Rakotonirina & Fisher, 2022
- Camponotus rotumanus Wilson & Taylor, 1967
- Camponotus rotundinodis Santschi, 1935
- Camponotus roubaudi Santschi, 1911
- Camponotus royi Shattuck & Janda, 2009
- Camponotus ruber Emery, 1925
- Camponotus rubidus Xiao & Wang, 1989
- Camponotus rubiginosus Mayr, 1876
- Camponotus rubripes (Latreille, 1802)
- Camponotus rubrithorax Forel, 1899
- Camponotus rudis McArthur, 2003
- Camponotus rufifemur Emery, 1900
- Camponotus rufigaster Menozzi, 1928
- Camponotus rufipes (Fabricius, 1775)
- Camponotus rufoglaucus (Jerdon, 1851)
- Camponotus rufonigrus (Shattuck & McArthur, 2002)
- Camponotus rufus Crawley, 1925
- Camponotus ruseni Karaman, 2012
- Camponotus rusticus Santschi, 1916

== S ==
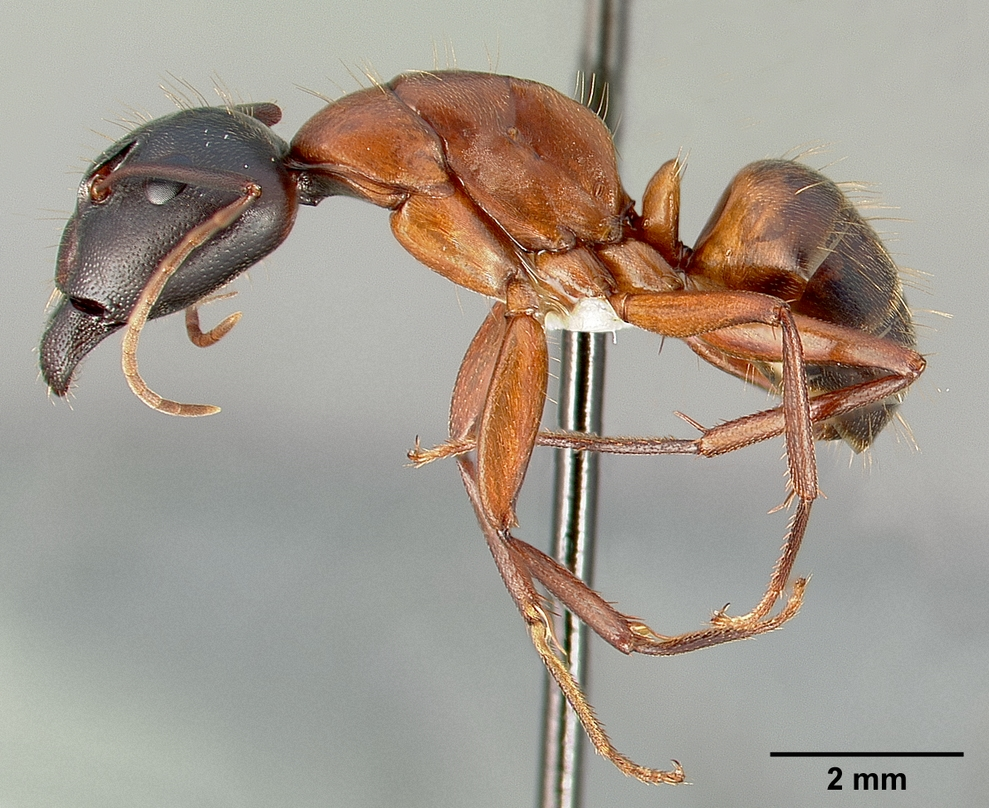
Camponotus semitestaceus

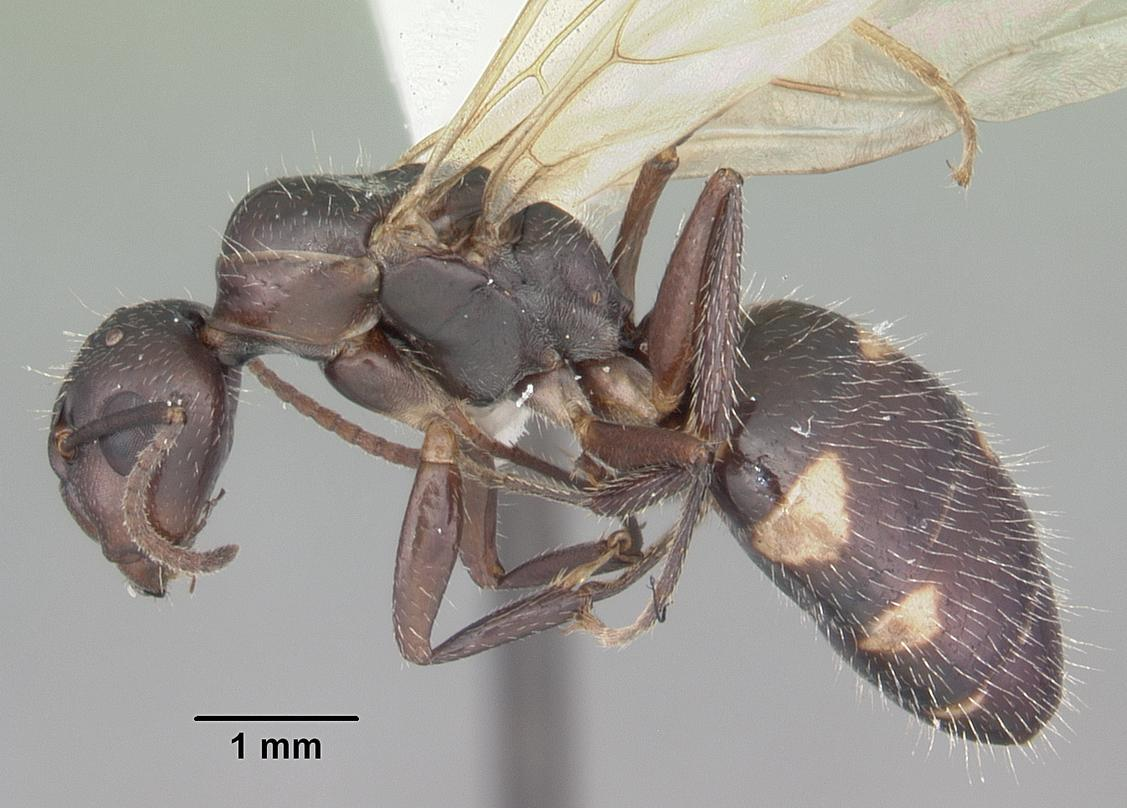
Camponotus sexguttatus

- Camponotus sacchii Emery, 1899
- Camponotus sada Rakotonirina & Fisher, 2018
- Camponotus salvini Forel, 1899
- Camponotus sambiranoensis Rakotonirina & Fisher, 2022
- Camponotus samius Forel, 1889
- Camponotus sanctaefidei Dalla Torre, 1892
- Camponotus sanctus Forel, 1904
- Camponotus sankisianus Forel, 1913
- Camponotus sannini Tohme & Tohme, 1999
- Camponotus sansabeanus (Buckley, 1866)
- Camponotus santosi Forel, 1908
- Camponotus santschii Forel, 1899
- Camponotus satan Wheeler, 1919
- Camponotus saussurei Forel, 1879
- Camponotus saxatilis Ruzsky, 1895
- Camponotus sayi Emery, 1893
- Camponotus scabrinodis Arnold, 1924
- Camponotus scalaris Forel, 1901
- Camponotus schaefferi Wheeler, 1909
- Camponotus schneei Mayr, 1903
- Camponotus schoedli Dumpert, 2006
- Camponotus schoutedeni Forel, 1911
- Camponotus schulzi Salata et al., 2019
- Camponotus schulzianus Zettel & Balàka, 2018
- Camponotus scipio Forel, 1908
- Camponotus scissus Mayr, 1887
- Camponotus scotti McArthur, 2003
- Camponotus scratius Forel, 1907
- Camponotus sculptor Santschi, 1920
- Camponotus sedulus (Smith F., 1857)
- Camponotus selene (Emery, 1889)
- Camponotus selidorsatus Prins, 1973
- Camponotus semirufus Emery, 1925
- Camponotus semitestaceus Snelling, 1970
- Camponotus semoni Forel, 1905
- Camponotus senex (Smith F., 1858)
- Camponotus senkakuensis Terayama, 2013
- Camponotus sericatus Mayr, 1887
- Camponotus sericeiventris (Guerin-Meneville, 1838)
- Camponotus sericeus (Fabricius, 1798)
- Camponotus serotinus Cagniant, 1996
- Camponotus sesquipedalis Roger, 1863
- Camponotus setitibia Forel, 1901
- Camponotus setosus (Shattuck & McArthur, 2002)
- Camponotus seurati Emery, 1920
- Camponotus sexguttatus (Fabricius, 1793)
- Camponotus sexpuctatus Forel, 1894
- Camponotus shaqualavensis Pisarski, 1971
- Camponotus sholensis Dhadwal & Bharti, 2023
- Camponotus siamensis Jaitrong & Jeenthong, 2022
- Camponotus sibreei Forel, 1891
- Camponotus sicheli Mayr, 1866
- Camponotus siemsseni Forel, 1901
- Camponotus sikorai Emery, 1920
- Camponotus silvestrii Emery, 1906
- Camponotus silvicola Forel, 1902
- Camponotus simillimus (Smith F., 1862)
- Camponotus simoni Emery, 1893
- Camponotus simpsoni McArthur, 2003
- Camponotus simulans Forel, 1910
- Camponotus simulator Forel, 1915
- Camponotus simus Emery, 1908
- Camponotus sinaiticus Ionescu-Hirsch, 2010
- Camponotus singularis (Smith F., 1858)
- Camponotus sklarus Bolton, 1995
- Camponotus snellingi Bolton, 1995
- Camponotus socius Roger, 1863
- Camponotus socorroensis Wheeler, 1934
- Camponotus socrates Forel, 1904
- Camponotus solon Forel, 1886
- Camponotus somalinus Andre, 1887
- Camponotus sophiae Zettel & Balàka, 2018
- Camponotus spanis Xiao & Wang, 1989
- Camponotus sphaericus Roger, 1863
- Camponotus sphenocephalus Emery, 1911
- Camponotus sphenoidalis Mayr, 1870
- Camponotus spinitarsus Emery, 1920
- Camponotus spinolae Roger, 1863
- Camponotus spissinodis Forel, 1909
- Camponotus sponsorum Forel, 1910
- Camponotus stefani McArthur, 2007
- Camponotus stefanschoedli (Zettel & Zimmermann, 2007)
- Camponotus storeatus Forel, 1910
- Camponotus strangulatus Santschi, 1911
- Camponotus striatipes Dumpert, 1995
- Camponotus striatus (Smith F., 1862)
- Camponotus stupendus MacKay, 2025
- Camponotus subbarbatus Emery, 1893
- Camponotus subcircularis Emery, 1920
- Camponotus subnitidus Mayr, 1876
- Camponotus subpilus Shattuck, 2005
- Camponotus substitutus Emery, 1894
- Camponotus subtilis (Smith F., 1860)
- Camponotus subtruncatus Borgmeier, 1929
- Camponotus sucki Forel, 1901
- Camponotus suffusus (Smith F., 1858)
- Camponotus syaukanii Zettel & Yamane, 2018
- Camponotus sylvaticus (Olivier, 1792)

== T ==
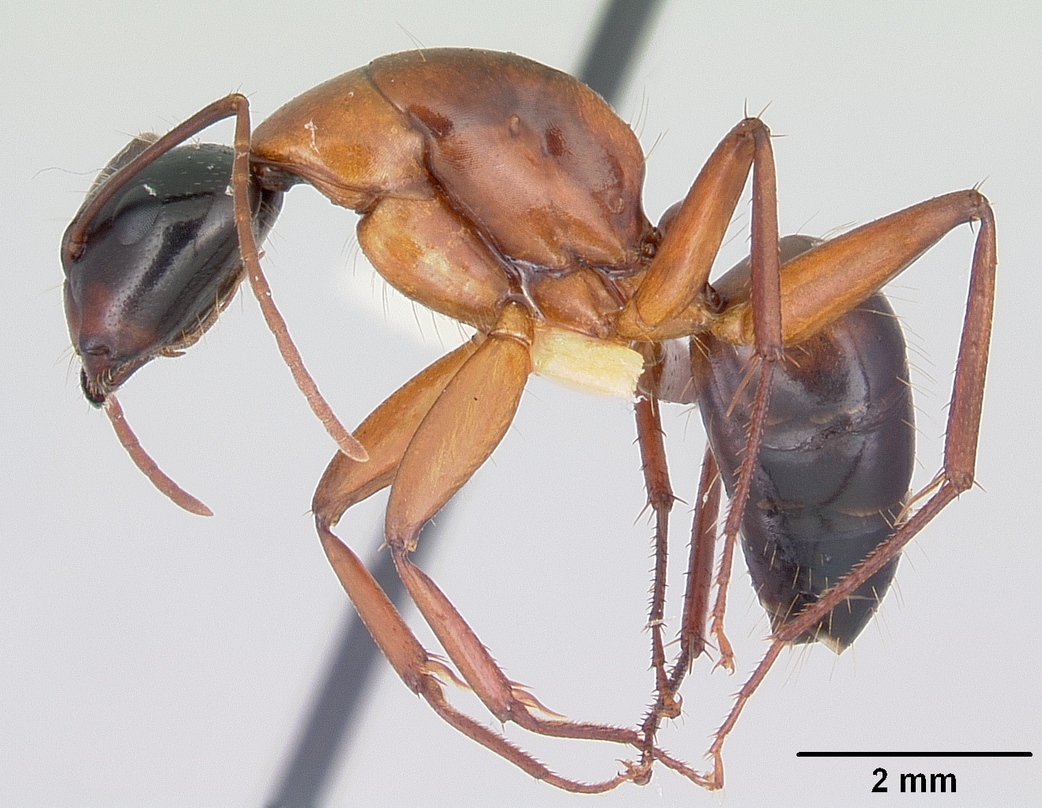
Camponotus texanus

- Camponotus tafo Rakotonirina, Csösz & Fisher, 2016
- Camponotus tahatensis Santschi, 1929
- Camponotus taino Snelling & Torres, 1998
- Camponotus taipingensis Forel, 1913
- Camponotus taniae Mackay & Delsinne, 2009
- Camponotus tanosy Rakotonirina & Fisher, 2018
- Camponotus tapia Rakotonirina & Fisher, 2022
- Camponotus tashcumiri Tarbinsky, 1976
- Camponotus tasmani Forel, 1902
- Camponotus tauricollis Forel, 1894
- Camponotus tendryi Rakotonirina & Fisher, 2022
- Camponotus tenuipes (Smith F., 1857)
- Camponotus tenuiscapus Roger, 1863
- Camponotus tepicanus Pergande, 1896
- Camponotus terbimaculatus Emery, 1920
- Camponotus terebrans (Lowne, 1865)
- Camponotus tergestinus Muller, 1921
- Camponotus termitarius Emery, 1902
- Camponotus terricola Karavaiev, 1929
- Camponotus territus Santschi, 1939
- Camponotus testaceus Emery, 1894
- Camponotus texanus Wheeler, 1903
- Camponotus texens Dumpert, 1986
- Camponotus textor Forel, 1899
- Camponotus thadeus Shattuck, 2005
- Camponotus thales Forel, 1910
- Camponotus themistocles Forel, 1910
- Camponotus thomasseti Forel, 1912
- Camponotus thoracicus (Fabricius, 1804)
- Camponotus thraso Forel, 1893
- Camponotus thysanopus Wheeler, 1937
- Camponotus tilhoi Santschi, 1926
- Camponotus timidus (Jerdon, 1851)
- Camponotus tinctus (Smith, 1858)
- Camponotus tol Gibson & Clouse, 2016
- Camponotus tonduzi Forel, 1899
- Camponotus tonkinus Santschi, 1925
- Camponotus torrei Aguayo, 1932
- Camponotus toussainti Wheeler & Mann, 1914
- Camponotus traegaordhi Santschi, 1914
- Camponotus traili Mayr, 1878
- Camponotus trajanus Forel, 1912
- Camponotus transvaalensis Arnold, 1948
- Camponotus trapeziceps Forel, 1908
- Camponotus trapezoideus Mayr, 1870
- Camponotus tratra Rakotonirina, Csösz & Fisher, 2016
- Camponotus trepidulus Creighton, 1965
- Camponotus tricolor Weber, 1943
- Camponotus tricoloratus Clark, 1941
- Camponotus trietericus Menozzi, 1926
- Camponotus trifasciatus Santschi, 1926
- Camponotus triodiae McArthur, 2009
- Camponotus tripartitus Mayr, 1887
- Camponotus tristis Clark, 1930
- Camponotus troodosensis Salata et al., 2023
- Camponotus truebi Forel, 1910
- Camponotus tsimelahy Rasoamanana & Fisher, 2022
- Camponotus tumidus Crawley, 1922
- Camponotus turkestanicus Emery, 1887
- Camponotus turkestanus Andre, 1882

== U ==
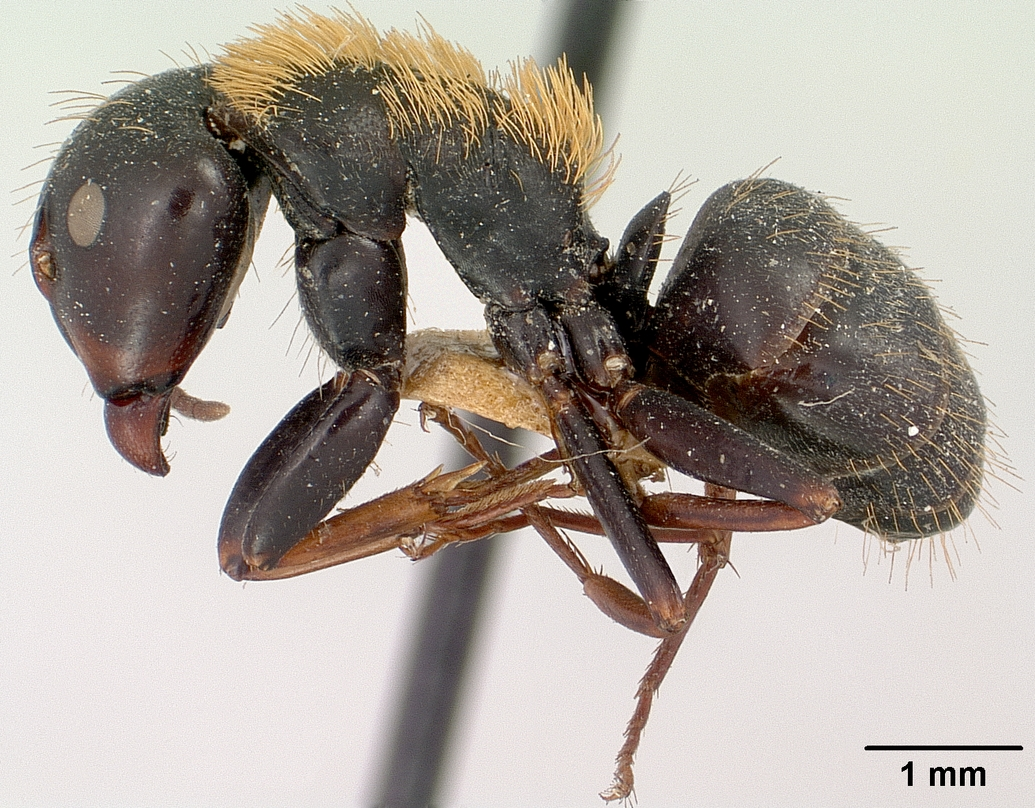
Camponotus ursus

- Camponotus ulcerosus Wheeler, 1910
- Camponotus ulei Forel, 1904
- Camponotus ulvarum Forel, 1899
- Camponotus universitatis Forel, 1890
- Camponotus urichi Forel, 1899
- Camponotus ursus Forel, 1886
- Camponotus ustus Forel, 1879

== V ==
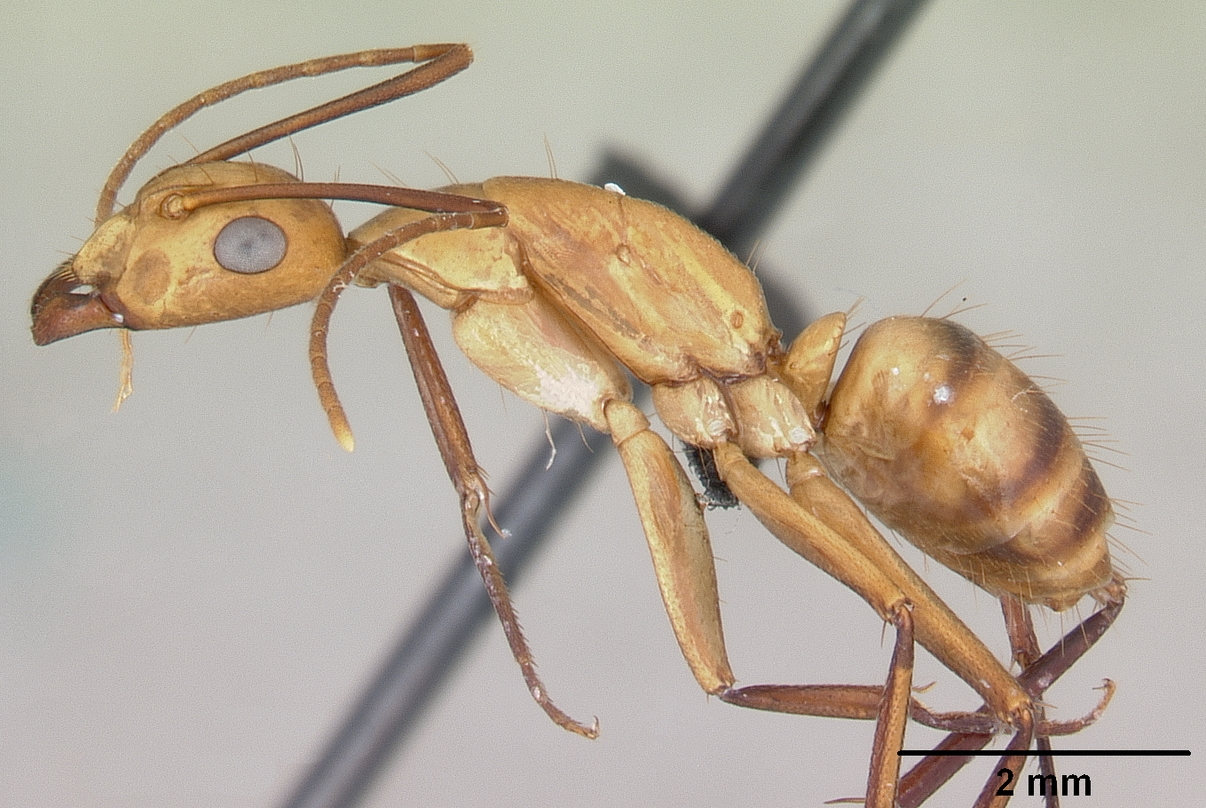
Camponotus variegatus

- Camponotus vafer Wheeler, 1910
- Camponotus vagulus Forel, 1908
- Camponotus vagus (Scopoli, 1763)
- Camponotus valdeziae Forel, 1879
- Camponotus validus MacKay, 2025
- Camponotus vanispinus Xia & Zheng, 1997
- Camponotus vano Rakotonirina & Fisher, 2022
- Camponotus varatra Rakotonirina, Csösz & Fisher, 2016
- Camponotus varians Roger, 1863
- Camponotus variegatus (Smith F., 1858)
- Camponotus varius Donisthorpe, 1943
- Camponotus varus Forel, 1910
- Camponotus velox (Jerdon, 1851)
- Camponotus verae Forel, 1908
- Camponotus versicolor Clark, 1930
- Camponotus vespertinus Arnold, 1960
- Camponotus vestitus (Smith F., 1858)
- Camponotus vicinus Mayr, 1870
- Camponotus victoriae Arnold, 1959
- Camponotus viehmeyeri Forel, 1911
- Camponotus vigilans (Smith F., 1858)
- Camponotus vinosus (Smith F., 1858)
- Camponotus viri Santschi, 1915
- Camponotus virulens (Smith F., 1861)
- Camponotus vitiosus Smith F., 1874
- Camponotus vittatus Forel, 1904
- Camponotus vividus (Smith F., 1858)
- Camponotus voeltzkowii Forel, 1894
- Camponotus vogti Forel, 1906
- Camponotus vulpusSantschi, 1926

== W ==
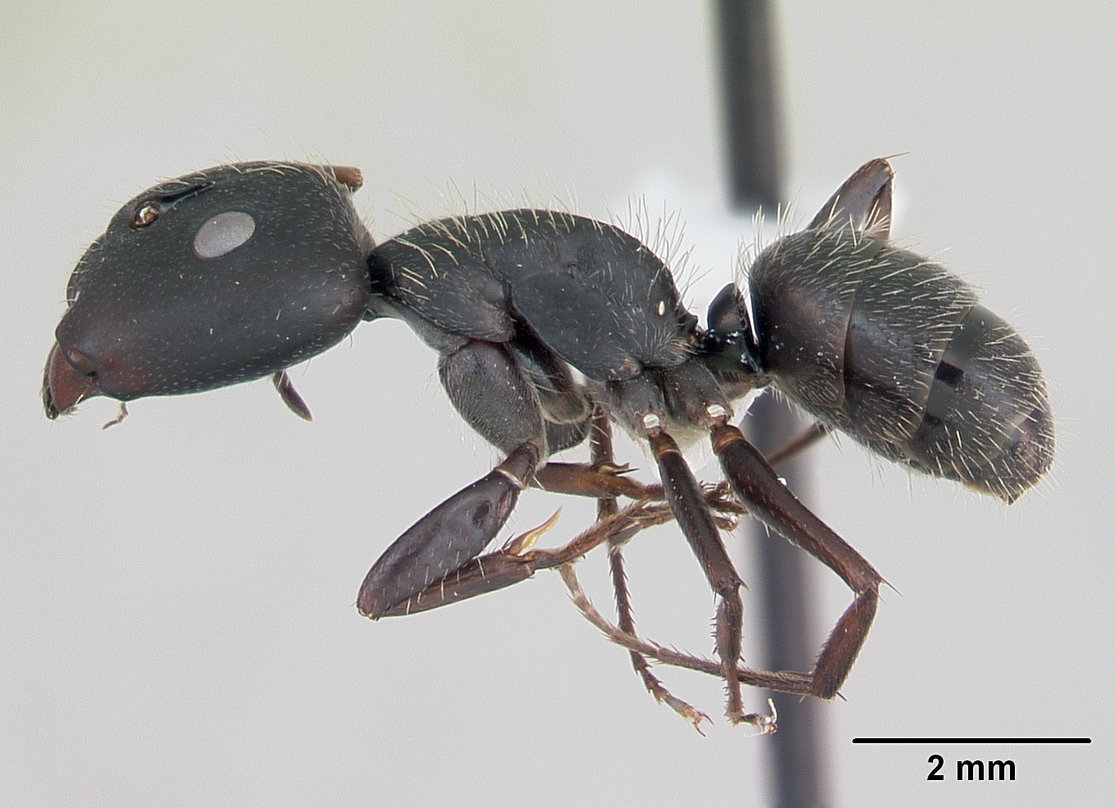
Camponotus westermanni

- Camponotus wanangus Klimes & McArthur, 2014
- Camponotus wasmanni Emery, 1893
- Camponotus wedda Forel, 1908
- Camponotus weiserti Zettel & Laciny, 2018
- Camponotus weismanni Forel, 1901
- Camponotus weissflogi Dumpert, 2006
- Camponotus wellmani Forel, 1909
- Camponotus werthi Forel, 1908
- Camponotus westermanni Mayr, 1862
- Camponotus wheeleri Mann, 1916
- Camponotus whitei Wheeler, 1915
- Camponotus wiederkehri Forel, 1894
- Camponotus wolfi Emery, 1920
- Camponotus woodroffeensis McArthur, 2008
- Camponotus wytsmani Emery, 1920

== X ==
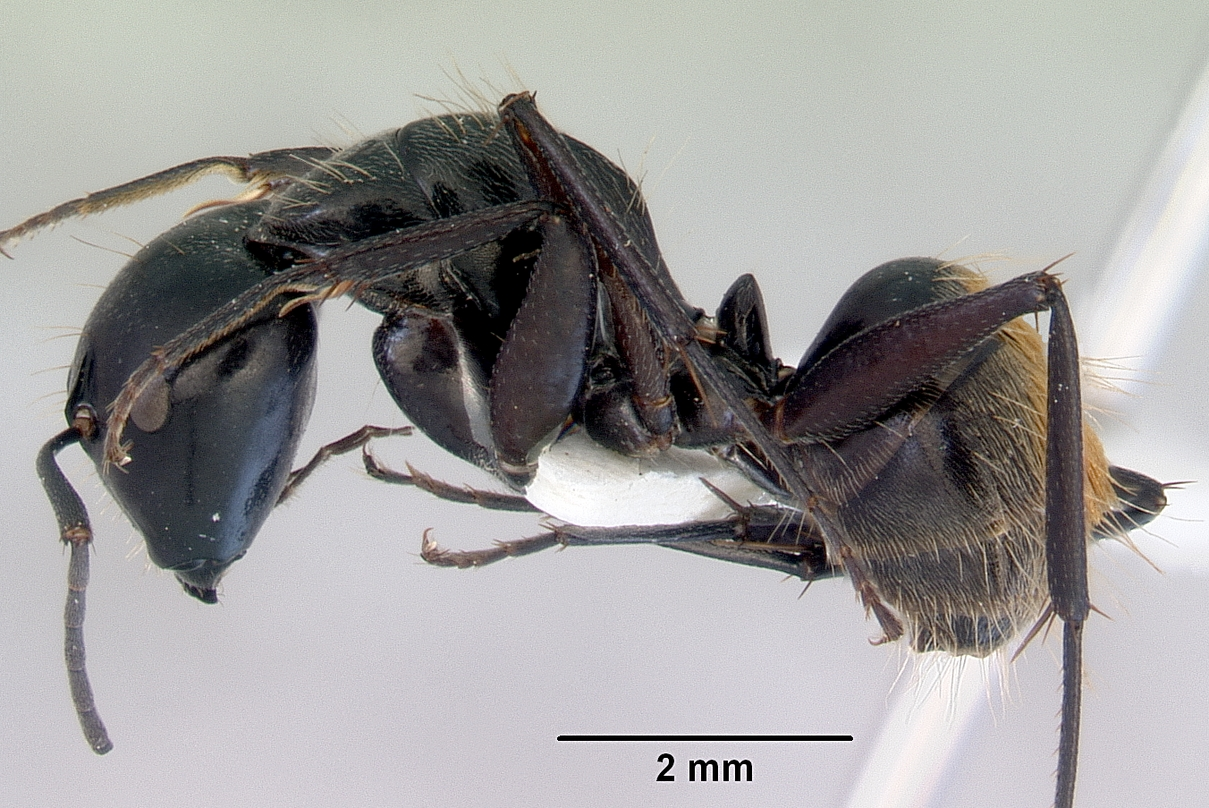
Camponotus xanthopilus

- Camponotus xanthogaster Santschi, 1925
- Camponotus xanthopilus Shattuck, 2005
- Camponotus xerxes Forel, 1904
- Camponotus xingdoushanensis Wang & Chen, 2003

== Y ==
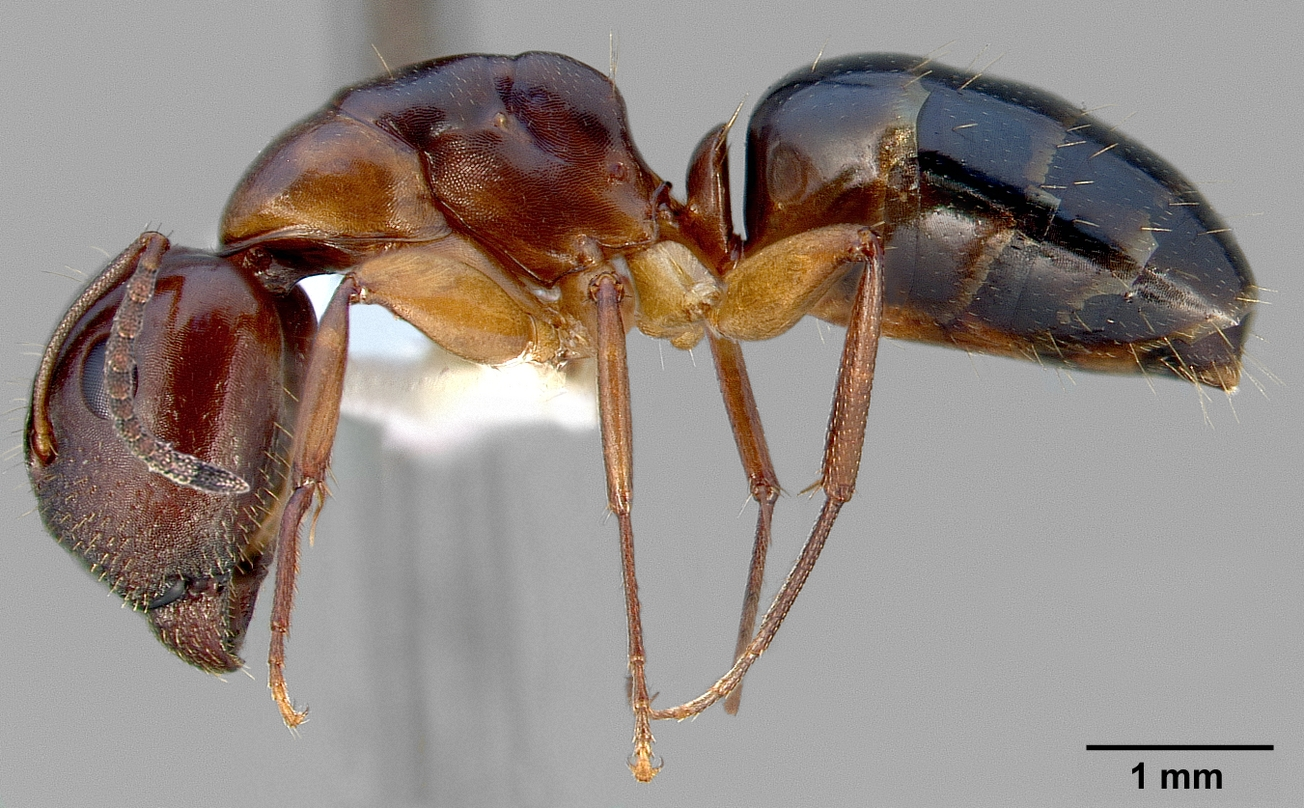
Camponotus yogi

- Camponotus yala Kusnezov, 1952
- Camponotus yamaokai Terayama and Satoh, 1990
- Camponotus yambaru Terayama, 1999
- Camponotus yessensis Yasumatsu and Brown, 1951
- Camponotus yiningensis Wang and wu, 1994
- Camponotus yogi Wheeler, 1915

== Z ==
- Camponotus zavo Rakotonirina, Csösz & Fisher, 2016
- Camponotus zenon Forel, 1912
- Camponotus zimmermanni Forel, 1894
- Camponotus zoc Forel, 1879
- Camponotus zonatus Emery, 1894
- Camponotus zoro Rasoamanana & Fisher, 2022
