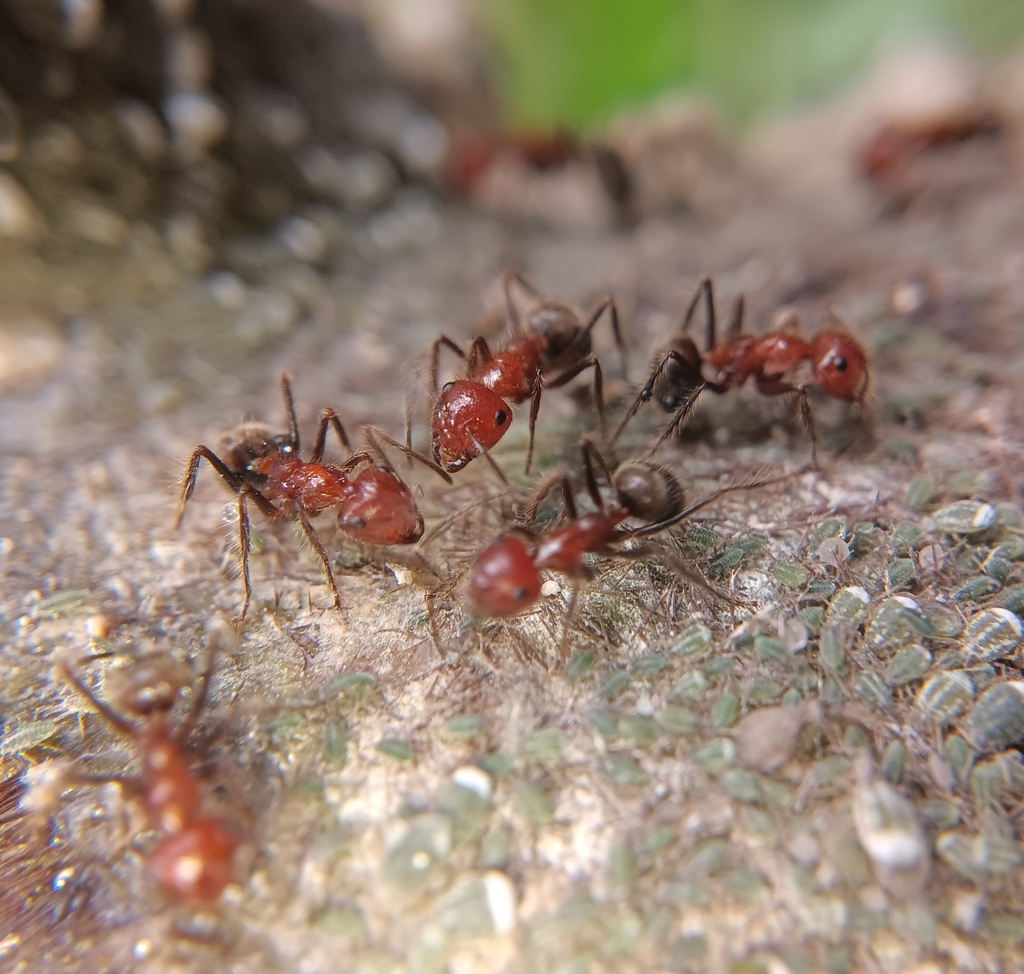

Scientific classification
- Kingdom: Animalia
- Phylum: Arthropoda
- Class: Insecta
- Order: Hymenoptera
- Family: Formicidae
- Subfamily: Formicinae
- Genus: Camponotus
- Species: C. horrens

Binomial name
- Camponotus horrens Forel, 1910

= Camponotus horrens =

Species of ant

Camponotus horrens is a species of carpenter ant that is native to Borneo and the Philippines.

== Description ==
This species is distinguished by its red head and lower abdomen connector, and black abdomen. The species has thin hairs and the mouth parts are reddish brown.
