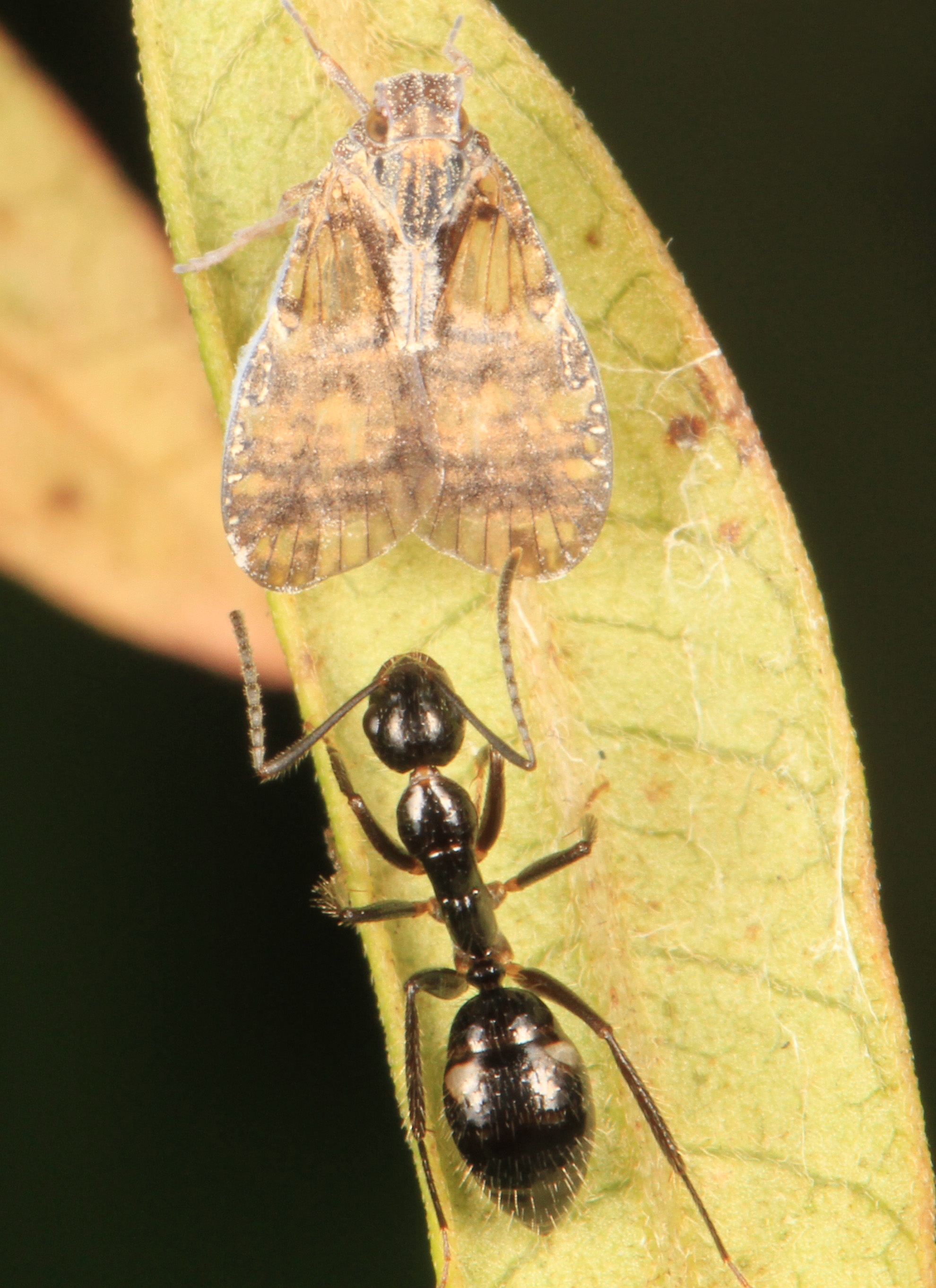

Scientific classification
- Kingdom: Animalia
- Phylum: Arthropoda
- Clade: Pancrustacea
- Class: Insecta
- Order: Hymenoptera
- Family: Formicidae
- Subfamily: Formicinae
- Genus: Camponotus
- Subgenus: Myrmosphincta
- Species: C. sexguttatus

Binomial name
- Camponotus sexguttatus (Fabricius, 1793)

= Camponotus sexguttatus =

Species of ant

Camponotus sexguttatus is a species of carpenter ant native to South America, Central America, Mexico, and the Caribbean. This species is invasive in Florida, Hawaii, and Arizona.

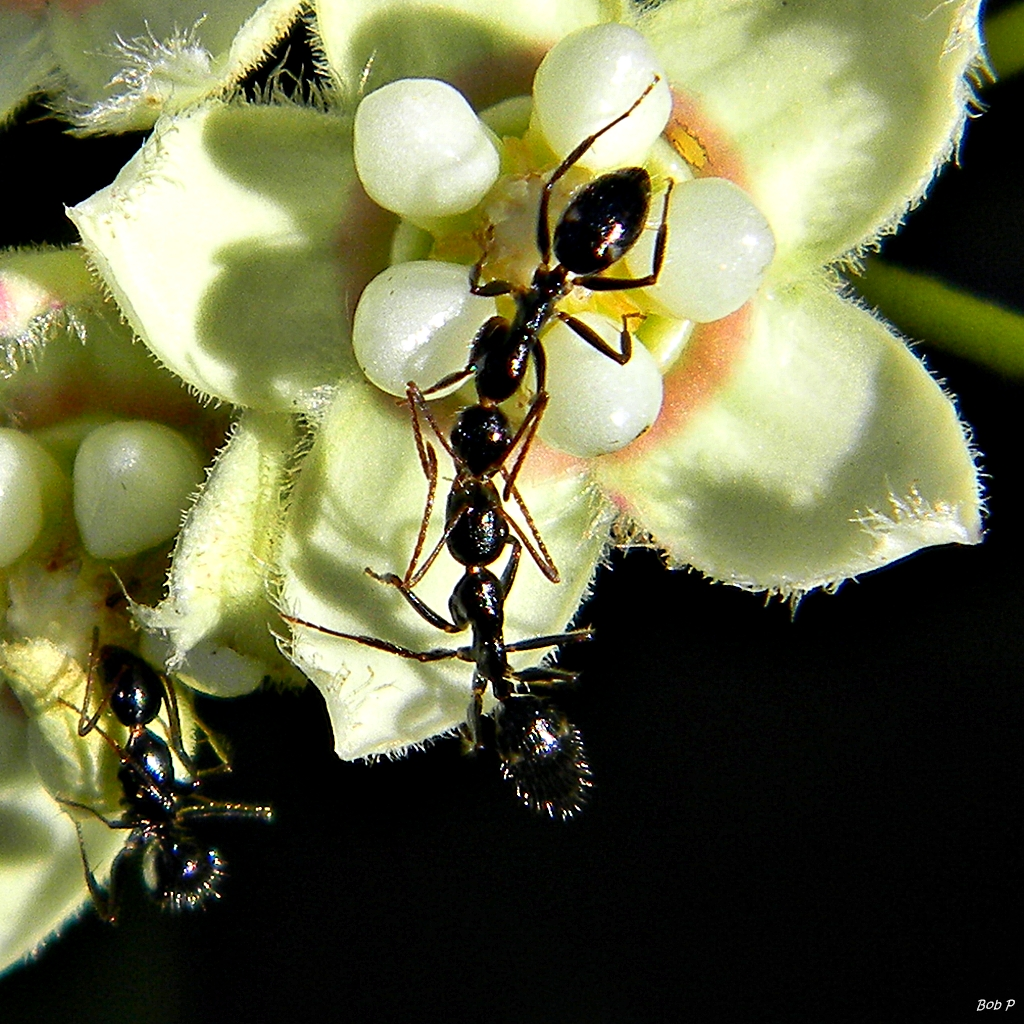

== Subspecies ==
- Camponotus sexguttatus albotaeniolatus Forel, 1921
- Camponotus sexguttatus antiguanus Wheeler, 1923
- Camponotus sexguttatus basirectus Wheeler, 1923
- Camponotus sexguttatus biguttatus Emery, 1894
- Camponotus sexguttatus decorus (Smith, 1858)
- Camponotus sexguttatus fusciceps Emery, 1906
- Camponotus sexguttatus montserratensis Wheeler, 1923
- Camponotus sexguttatus ornatus Emery, 1894
- Camponotus sexguttatus perturbans Kutter, 1931
- Camponotus sexguttatus sexguttatus (Fabricius, 1793)
- Camponotus sexguttatus unitaeniatus Wheeler, 1923
