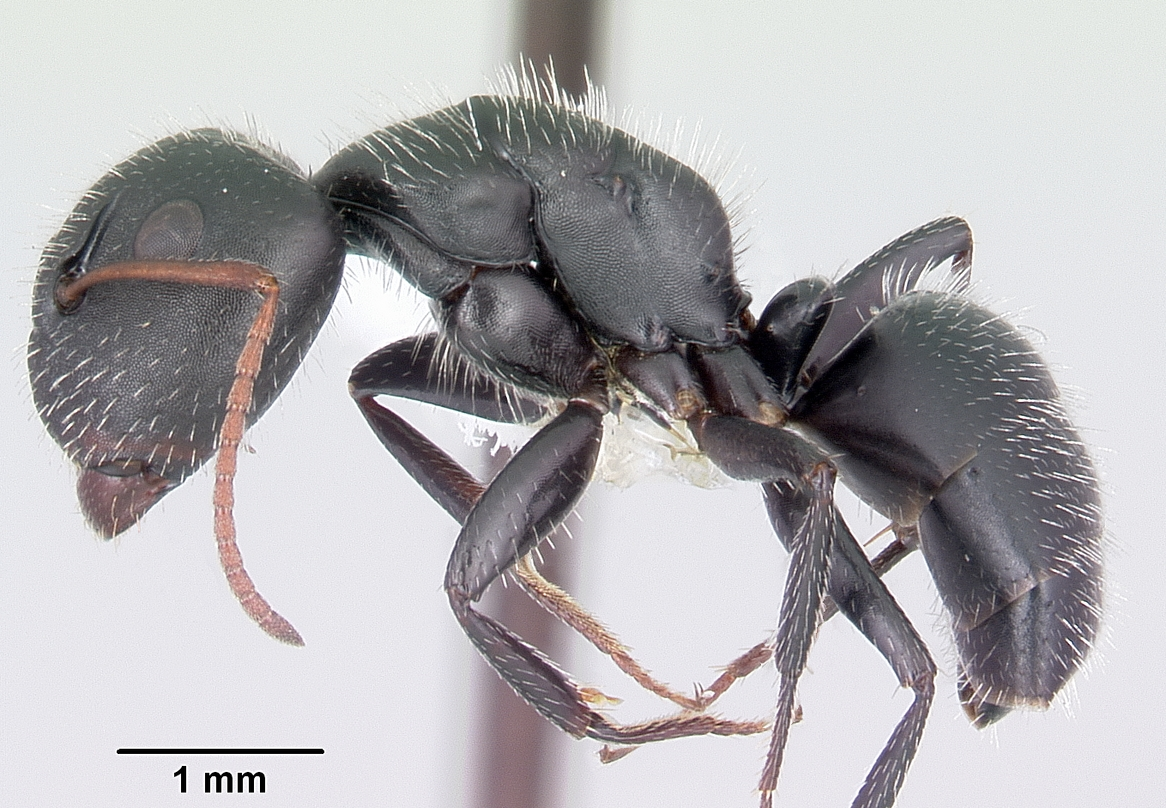
- Profile of major worker specimen, antweb.org

Scientific classification
- Domain: Eukaryota
- Kingdom: Animalia
- Phylum: Arthropoda
- Class: Insecta
- Order: Hymenoptera
- Family: Formicidae
- Subfamily: Formicinae
- Genus: Camponotus
- Subgenus: Myrmobrachys
- Species: C. mina

Binomial name
- Camponotus mina Forel, 1879

Synonyms
- Camponotus erythropus Pergande, 1893; C. mina zuni Wheeler, W.M., 1910

= Camponotus mina =

Species of ant

Camponotus mina is a species of carpenter ant native to large parts of northern Mexico, California, Arizona, Texas, and New Mexico, and possibly Wyoming, South Dakota, and Minnesota.
