= Camponotus divergens =

Scientific classification
- Domain: Eukaryota
- Kingdom: Animalia
- Phylum: Arthropoda
- Class: Insecta
- Order: Hymenoptera
- Family: Formicidae
- Subfamily: Formicinae
- Genus: Camponotus
- Subgenus: Hypercolobopsis
- Species: C. divergens

Binomial name
- Camponotus divergens Mayr, 1887

Species of ant

Camponotus divergens is a species of carpenter ant (genus Camponotus) found in Brazil.
