= Camponotus coriolanus =

Scientific classification
- Kingdom: Animalia
- Phylum: Arthropoda
- Clade: Pancrustacea
- Class: Insecta
- Order: Hymenoptera
- Family: Formicidae
- Subfamily: Formicinae
- Genus: Camponotus
- Subgenus: Hypercolobopsis
- Species: C. coriolanus

Binomial name
- Camponotus coriolanus Forel, 1912

Species of ant

Camponotus coriolanus is a species of carpenter ant (genus Camponotus) found in Brazil.
