= Camponotus vittatus =

Scientific classification
- Domain: Eukaryota
- Kingdom: Animalia
- Phylum: Arthropoda
- Class: Insecta
- Order: Hymenoptera
- Family: Formicidae
- Subfamily: Formicinae
- Genus: Camponotus
- Subgenus: Tanaemyrmex
- Species: C. vittatus

Binomial name
- Camponotus vittatus Forel, 1904

Species of ant

Camponotus vittatus is a species of carpenter ant and one of the most common ants found around households in South America, particularly Brazil. It was originally described by Auguste Forel in 1904. The species is relatively large, caramel-coloured, omnivorous, and fast-moving. The species presents four larval stages which will spin a cocoon to pupate. The hairs of Camponotus larvae are quite abundant, and may present taxonomic importance. The larvae of both sexes are similar, with few diagnostic traits, such as the acquired shape towards pupation inside their cocoons.
