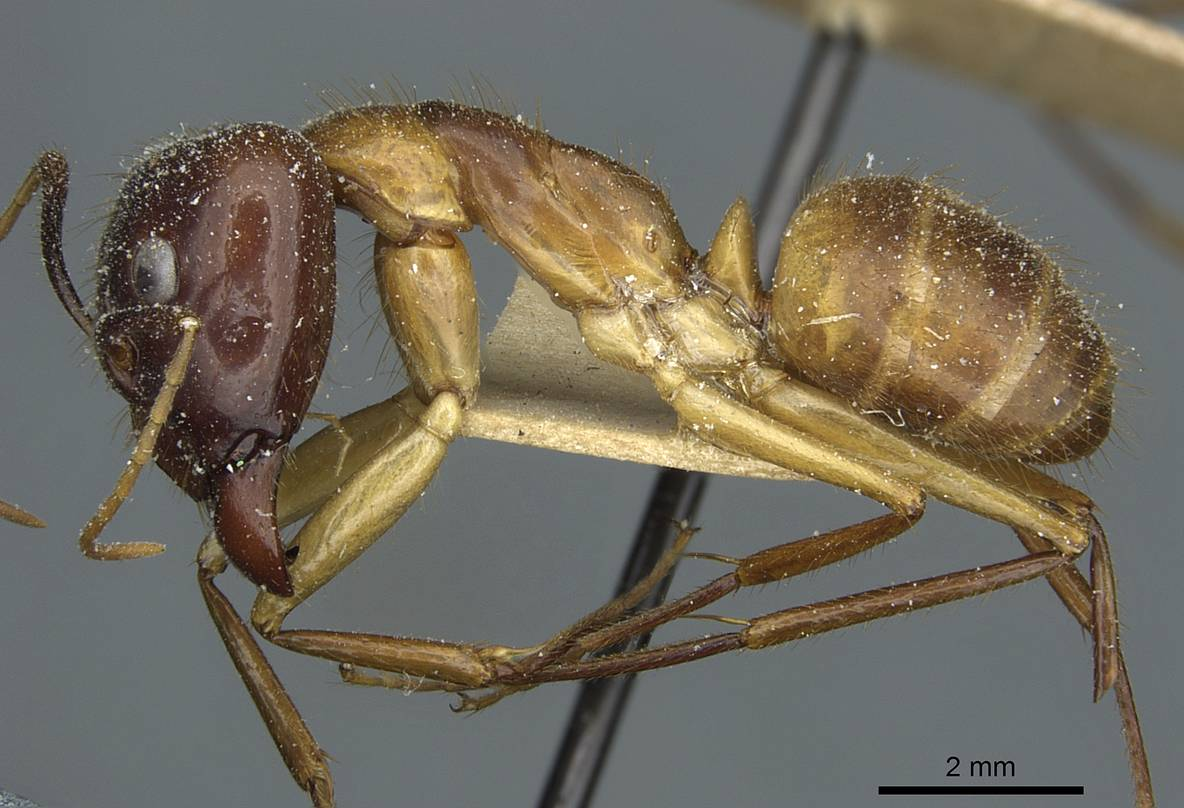

Scientific classification
- Domain: Eukaryota
- Kingdom: Animalia
- Phylum: Arthropoda
- Class: Insecta
- Order: Hymenoptera
- Family: Formicidae
- Subfamily: Formicinae
- Genus: Camponotus
- Subgenus: Tanaemyrmex
- Species: C. fumidus

Binomial name
- Camponotus fumidus Roger, 1863

Subspecies
- C. fumidus dominicensis Wheeler, W.M., 1913; C. fumidus fraterculus Wheeler, W.M. & Mann, 1914; C. fumidus haytianus Wheeler, W.M. & Mann, 1914; C. fumidus illitus Wheeler, W.M. & Mann, 1914; C. fumidus imbecillus Wheeler, W.M. & Mann, 1914; C. fumidus soulouquei Forel, 1901; C. fumidus toltecus Forel, 1899

= Camponotus fumidus =

Species of ant

Camponotus fumidus is a species of carpenter ant native to Mexico, Arizona, Venezuela, and possibly Texas, New Mexico, the Bahamas, Jamaica, Hispaniola, and Chile.
