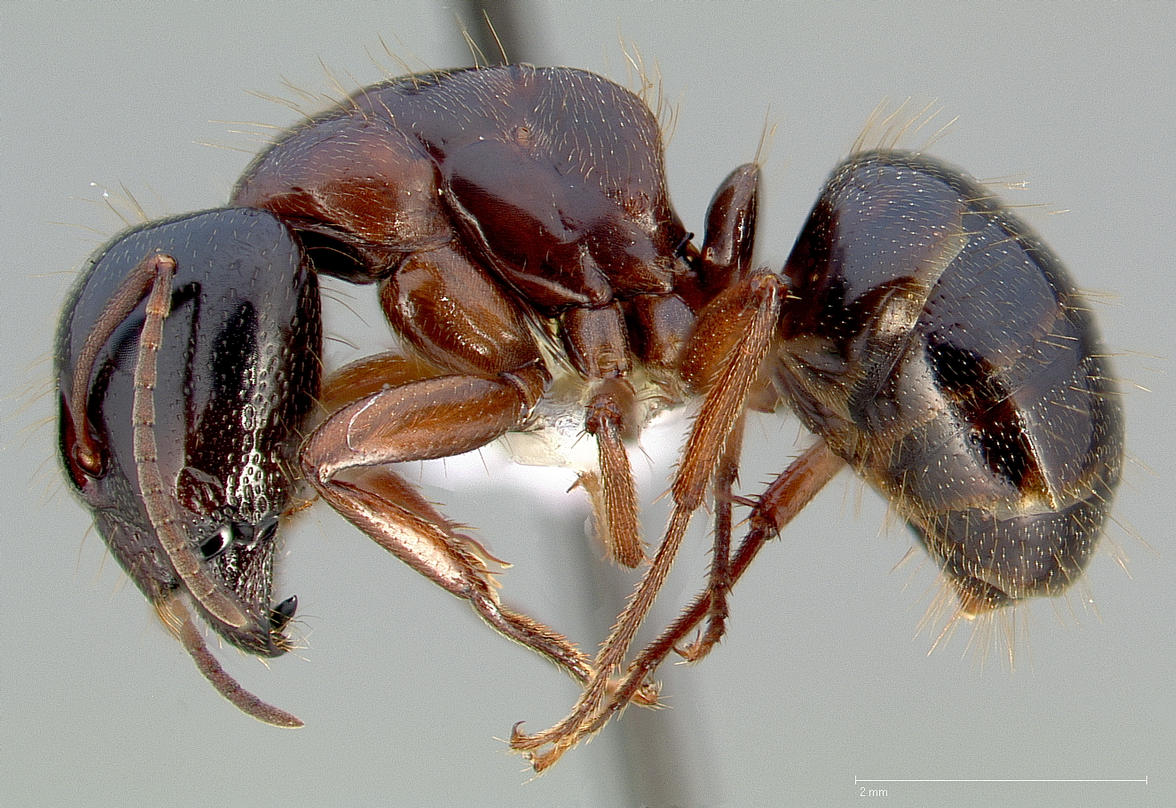

Scientific classification
- Kingdom: Animalia
- Phylum: Arthropoda
- Clade: Pancrustacea
- Class: Insecta
- Order: Hymenoptera
- Family: Formicidae
- Subfamily: Formicinae
- Genus: Camponotus
- Subgenus: Camponotus
- Species: C. johnsoni

Binomial name
- Camponotus johnsoni Mackay, 2019

= Camponotus johnsoni =

Species of ant

Camponotus johnsoni is a species of carpenter ant native to California and Baja California.
