= Camponotus holzi =

Scientific classification
- Kingdom: Animalia
- Phylum: Arthropoda
- Clade: Pancrustacea
- Class: Insecta
- Order: Hymenoptera
- Family: Formicidae
- Subfamily: Formicinae
- Genus: Camponotus
- Subgenus: Tanaemyrmex
- Species: C. holzi

Binomial name
- Camponotus holzi Forel, 1921

Species of ant

Camponotus holzi is a species of carpenter ant (genus Camponotus) found in Ecuador.
