= List of Cremastocheilus species =

This is a list of species in the genus Cremastocheilus, anteater scarab beetles.

== Species ==
- Cremastocheilus academicus Krikken, 1982
- Cremastocheilus angularis Leconte, 1857
- Cremastocheilus armatus Walker, 1866
- Cremastocheilus beameri Cazier, 1940
- Cremastocheilus canaliculatus Kirby, 1827
- Cremastocheilus castaneae Knoch, 1801
- Cremastocheilus chapini Cazier, 1940
- Cremastocheilus congener Casey, 1915
- Cremastocheilus constricollis Cazier, 1940
- Cremastocheilus constricticollis Cazier, 1940
- Cremastocheilus crinitus Leconte, 1874
- Cremastocheilus depressus Leconte, 1863
- Cremastocheilus excavatus Cazier, 1940
- Cremastocheilus harrisii Kirby, 1827
- Cremastocheilus hirsutus Van Dyke, 1918
- Cremastocheilus knochii Leconte, 1853
- Cremastocheilus lengi Cazier, 1940
- Cremastocheilus maritimus Casey, 1915
- Cremastocheilus mentalis Cazier, 1940
- Cremastocheilus mexicanus Schaum, 1841
- Cremastocheilus nitens Leconte, 1853
- Cremastocheilus opaculus Horn, 1894
- Cremastocheilus planatus Leconte, 1863
- Cremastocheilus planipes Horn, 1885
- Cremastocheilus pulverulentus Cazier, 1940
- Cremastocheilus puncticollis Cazier, 1940
- Cremastocheilus quadratus Fall, 1912
- Cremastocheilus quadricollis (Casey, 1915)
- Cremastocheilus retractus Leconte, 1874
- Cremastocheilus robinsoni Cazier, 1940
- Cremastocheilus saucius Leconte, 1858
- Cremastocheilus schaumii LeConte, 1853
- Cremastocheilus setosifrons (Casey, 1915)
- Cremastocheilus spinifer Horn, 1885
- Cremastocheilus squamulosus Leconte, 1858
- Cremastocheilus stathamae Cazier, 1961
- Cremastocheilus tomentosus Warner, 1985
- Cremastocheilus variolosus Kirby, 1826
- Cremastocheilus westwoodi Horn, 1880
- Cremastocheilus wheeleri LeConte, 1876
