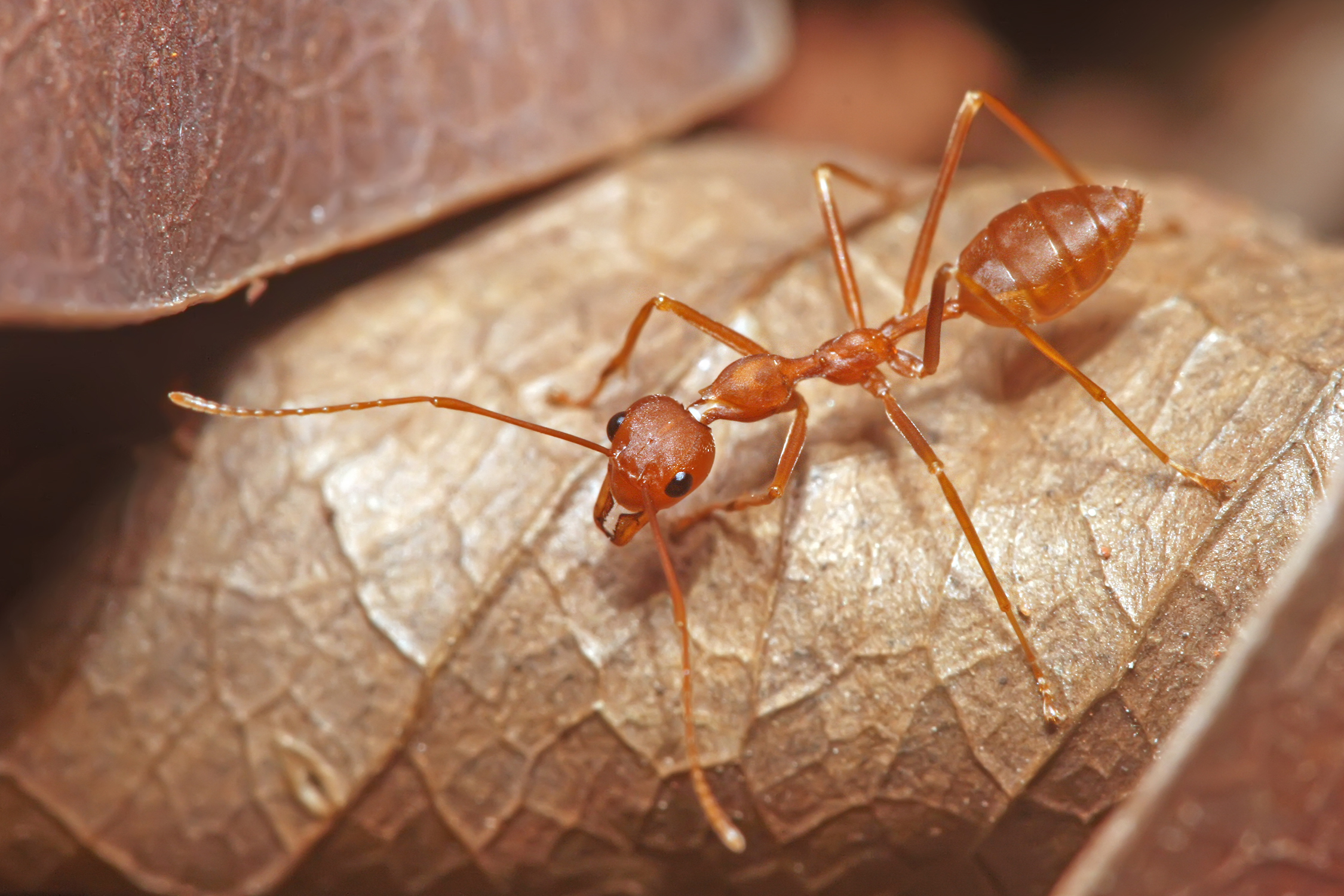
- Weaver ant (Oecophylla smaragdina) major worker (India).
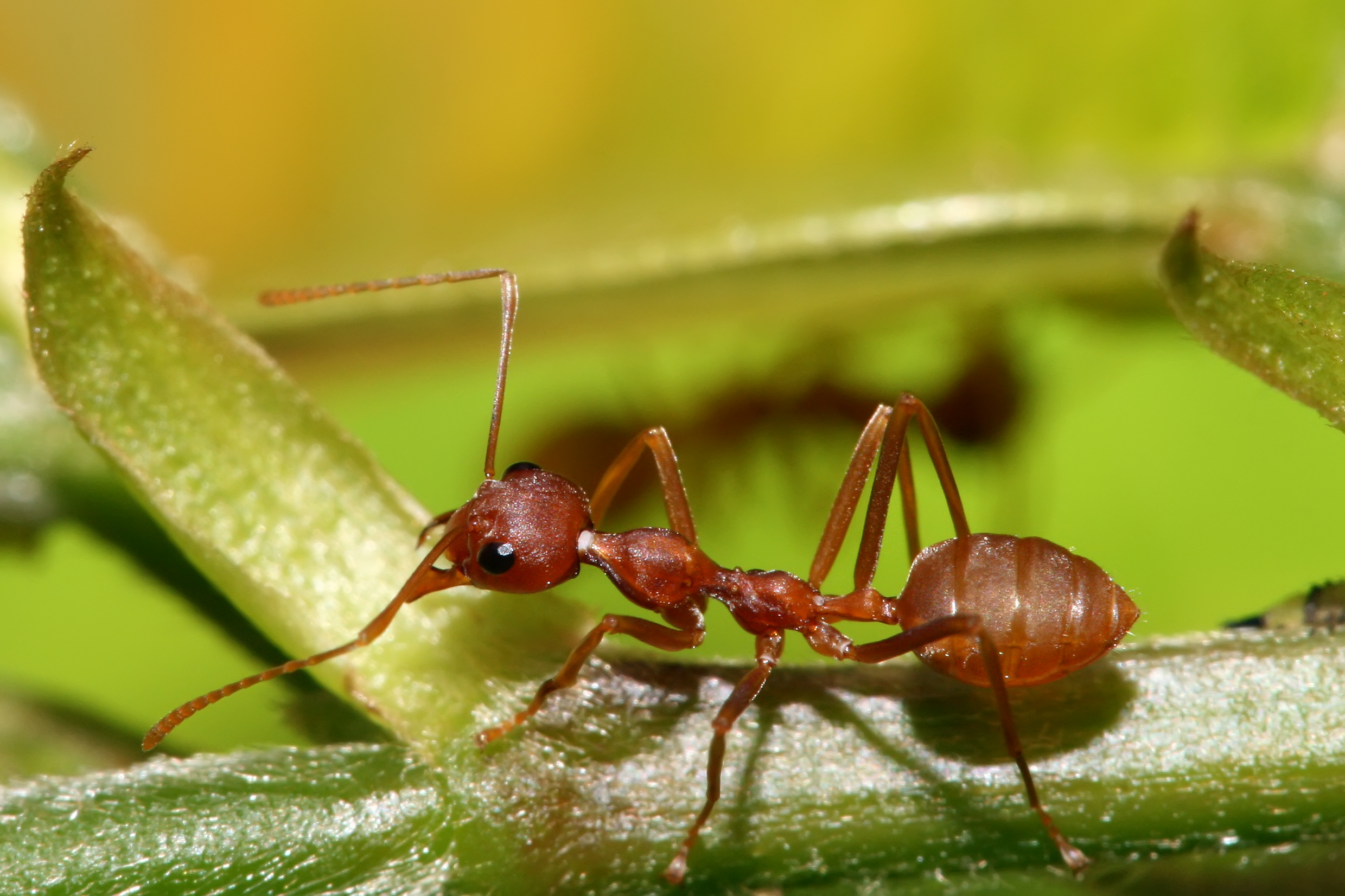
- Weaver ant (Oecophylla longinoda) major worker (Tanzania)

Scientific classification
- Kingdom: Animalia
- Phylum: Arthropoda
- Clade: Pancrustacea
- Class: Insecta
- Order: Hymenoptera
- Family: Formicidae
- Subfamily: Formicinae
- Tribe: Oecophyllini; Emery, 1895
- Genus: Oecophylla; Smith, 1860

Type species
- Formica virescens (junior synonym of Oecophylla smaragdina)

Diversity
- 3 extant species 15 extinct species
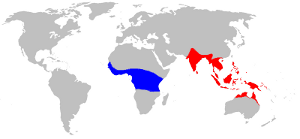
- Oecophylla range map. Oecophylla longinoda in blue, Oecophylla smaragdina in red.

= Weaver ant =

Weaver ant Temporal range: Ypresian – Recent 52.1–0 Ma

Genus of ants

Weaver ants or green ants are eusocial insects of the ant family (Formicidae) belonging to the tribe Oecophyllini. Weaver ants live in trees (they are obligately arboreal) and are known for their unique nest building behaviour where workers construct nests by weaving together leaves using larval silk. Colonies can be extremely large consisting of more than a hundred nests spanning numerous trees and containing more than half a million workers. Like many other ant species, weaver ants prey on small insects and supplement their diet with carbohydrate-rich honeydew excreted by scale insects (Hemiptera). Weaver ant workers exhibit a clear bimodal size distribution, with almost no overlap between the size of the minor and major workers. The major workers are approximately 8–10 mm (0.31–0.39 in) in length and the minors approximately half the length of the majors. Major workers forage, defend, maintain, and expand the colony whereas minor workers tend to stay within the nests where they care for the brood and 'milk' scale insects in or close to the nests.

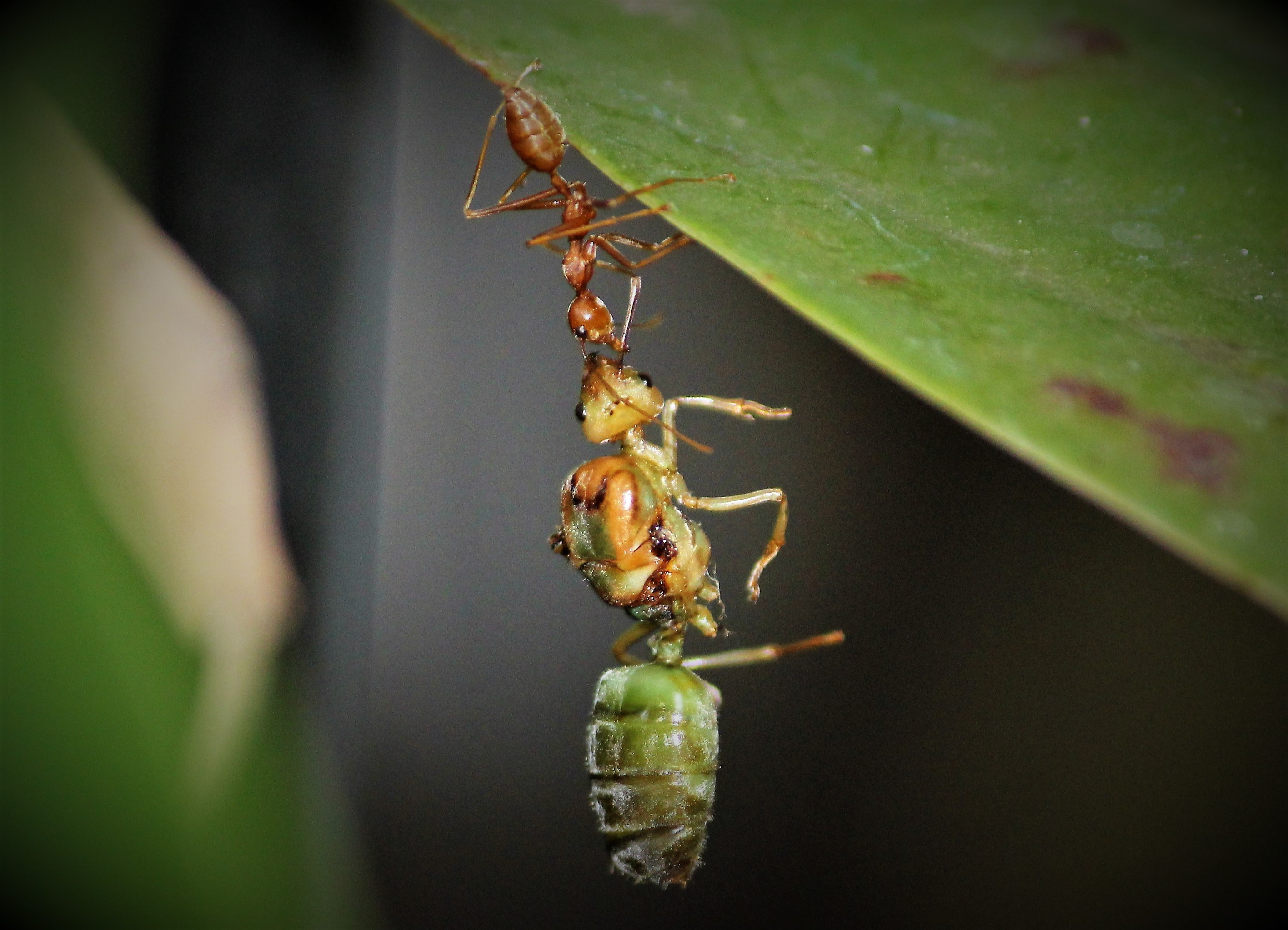
Dead weaver ant queen carried by a worker ant

Weaver ants vary in color from reddish to yellowish brown dependent on the species. Oecophylla smaragdina found in Australia often have bright green gasters. Weaver ants are highly territorial and workers aggressively defend their territories against intruders. Because they prey on insects harmful to their host trees, weaver ants are sometimes used by indigenous farmers, particularly in southeast Asia, as natural biocontrol agents against agricultural pests. Although weaver ants lack a functional sting they can inflict painful bites and often spray formic acid directly at the bite wound resulting in intense discomfort.

Researchers report weaver ants display remarkable teamwork, increasing individual effort as group size grows—unlike human teams. They build complex leaf nests using a “force ratchet” system, where some ants pull while others anchor, boosting efficiency. This coordinated labor offers insights for robotics, suggesting that mimicking ant strategies could enhance multi-agent cooperation and improve autonomous systems. Their behavior challenges long-held assumptions about group dynamics and productivity.

== Taxonomy ==
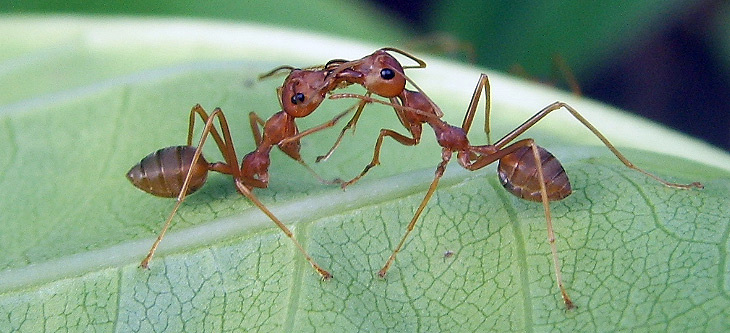
Liquid food exchange (trophallaxis) in O. smaragdina

Oecophylla (subfamily Formicinae) is one group of weaver ants containing two closely related living species: O. longinoda and O. smaragdina. They are placed in a tribe of their own, Oecophyllini with the extinct genus Eoecophylla. The weaver ant genus Oecophylla is relatively old, and 15 fossil species have been described from Eocene to Miocene deposits. The oldest members of both Oecophyllini and Oecophylla are fossils described from the mid-Ypresian Eocene Okanagan Highlands of Northwestern North America. Two other genera of weaving ants, Polyrhachis and Camponotus, also use larval silk in nest construction, but the construction and architecture of their nests are simpler than those of Oecophylla.

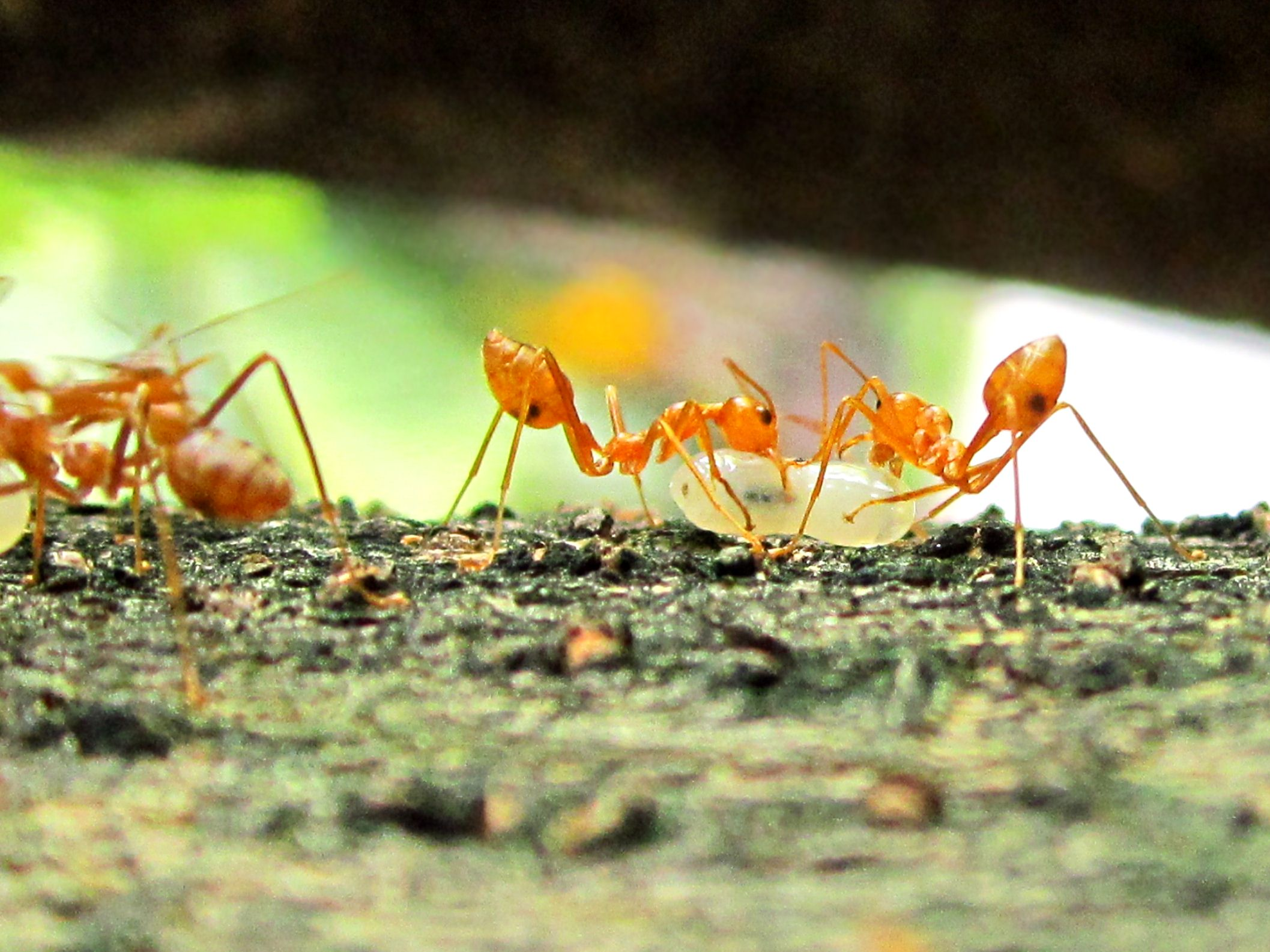
Two O. smaragdina transferring food to their colony

The common features of the genus include an elongated first funicular segment, presence of propodeal lobes, helcium at midheight of abdominal segment 3 and gaster capable of reflexion over the mesosoma. Males have vestigial pretarsal claws.

=== Genera and species ===
- Oecophylla

Extant species:

- Oecophylla kolhapurensis Kurane et al., 2015
- Oecophylla longinoda (Latreille, 1802)
- Oecophylla smaragdina (Fabricius, 1775)

Extinct species:

- †Oecophylla atavina Cockerell, 1915
- †Oecophylla bartoniana Cockerell, 1920
- †Oecophylla brischkei Mayr, 1868
- †Oecophylla crassinoda Wheeler, 1922
- †Oecophylla eckfeldiana Dlussky, Wappler & Wedmann, 2008
- †Oecophylla grandimandibula Riou, 1999
- †Oecophylla kraussei (Dlussky & Rasnitsyn, 1999)
- †Oecophylla leakeyi Wilson & Taylor, 1964
- †Oecophylla longiceps Dlussky, Wappler & Wedmann, 2008
- †Oecophylla megarche Cockerell, 1915
- †Oecophylla obesa (Heer, 1849)
- †Oecophylla praeclara Förster, 1891
- †Oecophylla sicula Emery, 1891
- †Oecophylla superba Théobald, 1937
- †Eoecophylla Archibald, Mathewes, & Perfilieva, 2024

== Description ==
Oecophylla have 12-segmented antennae, a feature shared with some other ant genera. The mandibles each have 10 or more teeth, and the fourth tooth from the tip is longer than the third and fifth teeth. The palps are short, with the maxillary palps being 5-segmented and the labial palps being 4-segmented. The mesonotum is constricted and (in dorsal view) narrower than the pronotum and propodeum. The node of the petiole is low and rounded.

== Distribution and habitat ==
O. longinoda is distributed in the Afrotropics and O. smaragdina from India and Sri Lanka in southern Asia, through southeastern Asia to northern Australia and Melanesia. In Australia, Oecophylla smaragdina is found in the tropical coastal areas as far south as Broome in Western Australia and across the coastal tropics of the Northern Territory down to Yeppoon in Queensland.

== Colony ontogeny and social organization ==
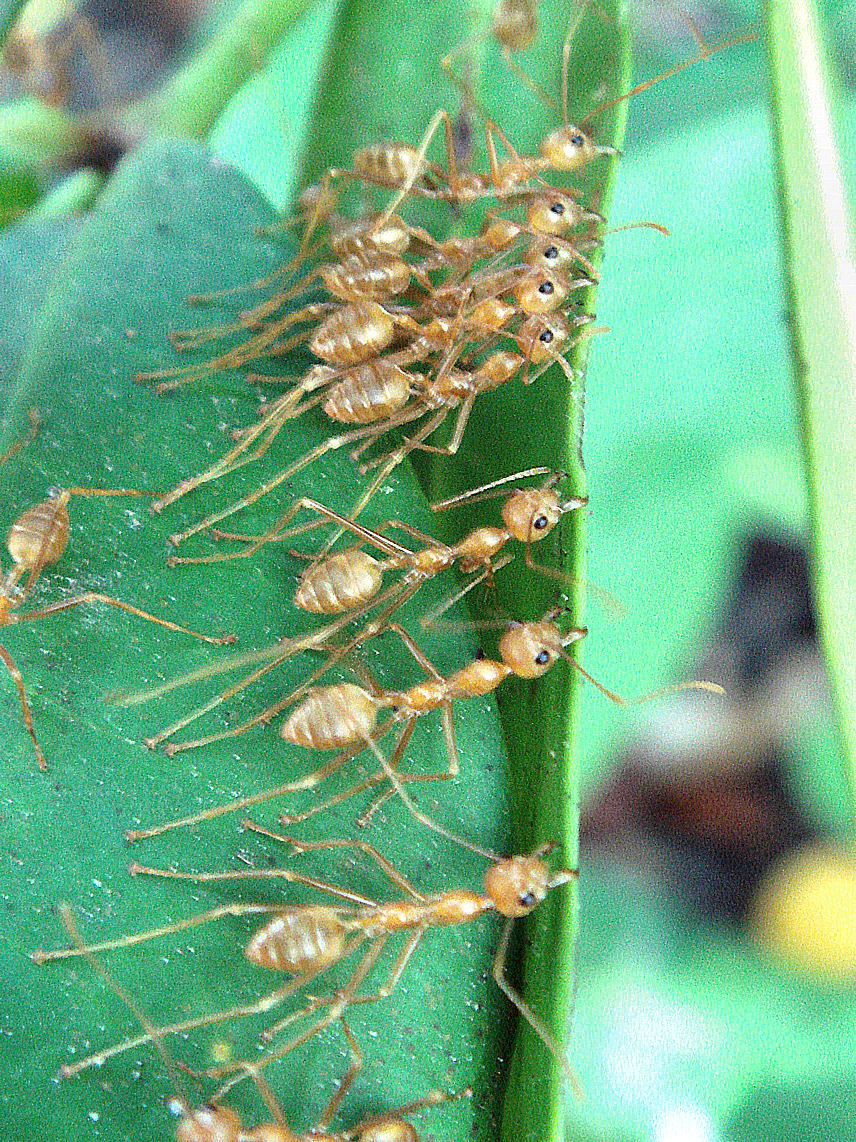
Weaver ants collaborating to pull nest leaves together

Weaver ant colonies are founded by one or more mated females (queens). A queen lays her first clutch of eggs on a leaf and protects and feeds the larvae until they develop into mature workers. The workers then construct leaf nests and help rear new brood laid by the queen. As the number of workers increases, more nests are constructed and colony productivity and growth increase significantly. Workers perform tasks that are essential to colony survival, including foraging, nest construction, and colony defense. The exchange of information and modulation of worker behaviour that occur during worker-worker interactions are facilitated by the use of chemical and tactile communication signals. These signals are used primarily in the contexts of foraging and colony defense. Successful foragers lay down pheromone trails that help recruit other workers to new food sources. Pheromone trails are also used by patrollers to recruit workers against territorial intruders. Along with chemical signals, workers also use tactile communication signals such as attenation and body shaking to stimulate activity in signal recipients. Multimodal communication in Oecophylla weaver ants importantly contributes to colony self-organization. Like many other ant species, Oecophylla workers exhibit social carrying behavior as part of the recruitment process, in which one worker will carry another worker in its mandibles and transport it to a location requiring attention.

== Parasites and predators ==
The larvae of the myrmecophile butterfly Liphyra brassolis live within the nests of Oecophylla and feed on the brood of the ants in Southeast Asia. Similar behavior has also been recorded for the lycaenid Zesius chrysomallus in South Asia. The chalcid wasp Smicromorpha has several species that are parasitoids of this species in Africa, Asia and Australia. Some cetoniine beetles in the genus Campsiura are thought to have larvae that feed on the brood of the ants.

== Nest building behaviour ==
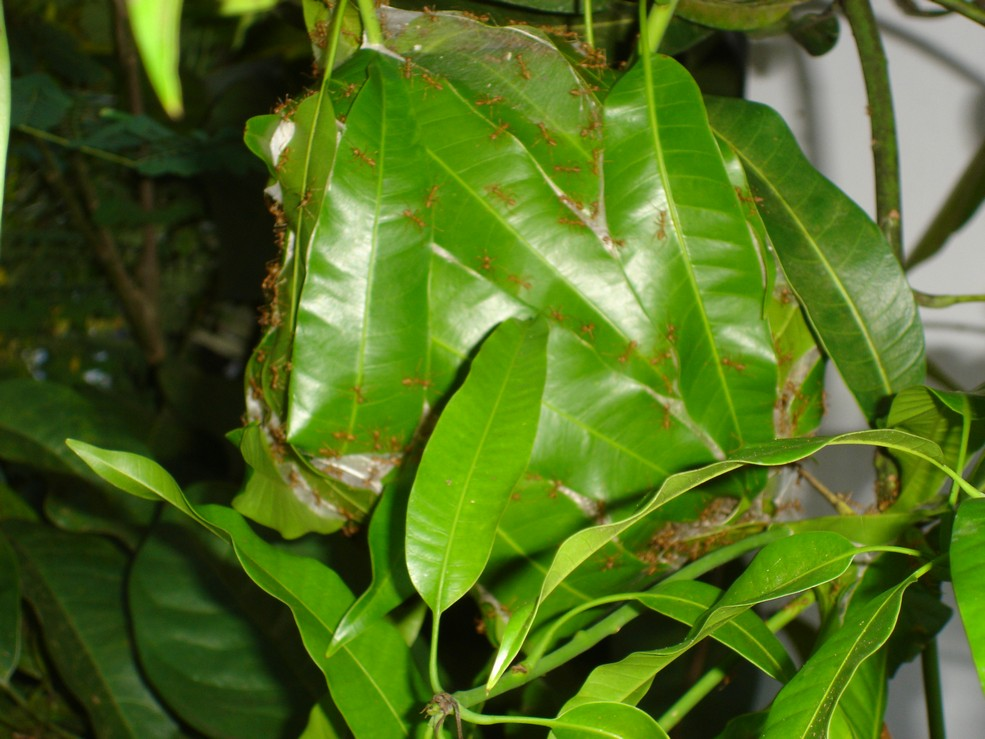
Weaver ant nest on a mango tree

Oecophylla weaver ants are known for their cooperative behaviour used in nest construction. Possibly the first description of weaver ants' nest building behaviour written in English was made by the English naturalist Joseph Banks, who took part in Captain James Cook's voyage to Australia in 1768. An excerpt from Joseph Banks' Journal (cited in Hölldobler and Wilson 1990) is included below:

The ants...one green as a leaf, and living upon trees, where it built a nest, in size between that of a man's head and his fist, by bending the leaves together, and gluing them with whitish paperish substances which held them firmly together. In doing this their management was most curious: they bend down four leaves broader than a man's hand, and place them in such a direction as they choose. This requires a much larger force than these animals seem capable of; many thousands indeed are employed in the joint work. I have seen as many as could stand by one another, holding down such a leaf, each drawing down with all his might, while others within were employed to fasten the glue. How they had bent it down I had not the opportunity of seeing, but it was held down by main strength, I easily proved by disturbing a part of them, on which the leaf bursting from the rest, returned to its natural situation, and I had an opportunity of trying with my finger the strength of these little animals must have used to get it down.

The weaver ants' ability to build capacious nests from living leaves has undeniably contributed to their ecological success. The first phase in nest construction involves workers surveying potential nesting leaves by pulling on the edges with their mandibles. When a few ants have successfully bent a leaf onto itself or drawn its edge toward another, other workers nearby join the effort. The probability of a worker joining the concerted effort is dependent on the size of the group, with workers showing a higher probability of joining when group size is large. When the span between two leaves is beyond the reach of a single ant, workers form chains with their bodies by grasping one another's petiole (waist). Multiple intricate chains working in unison are often used to ratchet together large leaves during nest construction. Once the edges of the leaves are drawn together, other workers retrieve larvae from existing nests using their mandibles. Upon reaching a seam to be joined, these workers tap the head of the clutched larvae, which causes them to excrete silk. They can only produce so much silk, so the larva will have to pupate without a cocoon. The workers then maneuver between the leaves in a highly coordinated fashion to bind them together. Weaver ants' nests are usually elliptical in shape and range in size from a single small leaf folded and bound onto itself to large nests consisting of many leaves and measure over half a meter in length. The time required to construct a nest varies depending on leaf type and eventual size, but often a large nest can be built in significantly less than 24 hours. Although weaver ants' nests are strong and impermeable to water, new nests are continually being built by workers in large colonies to replace old dying nests and those damaged by storms.

== Relationship with humans ==
=== In agriculture ===
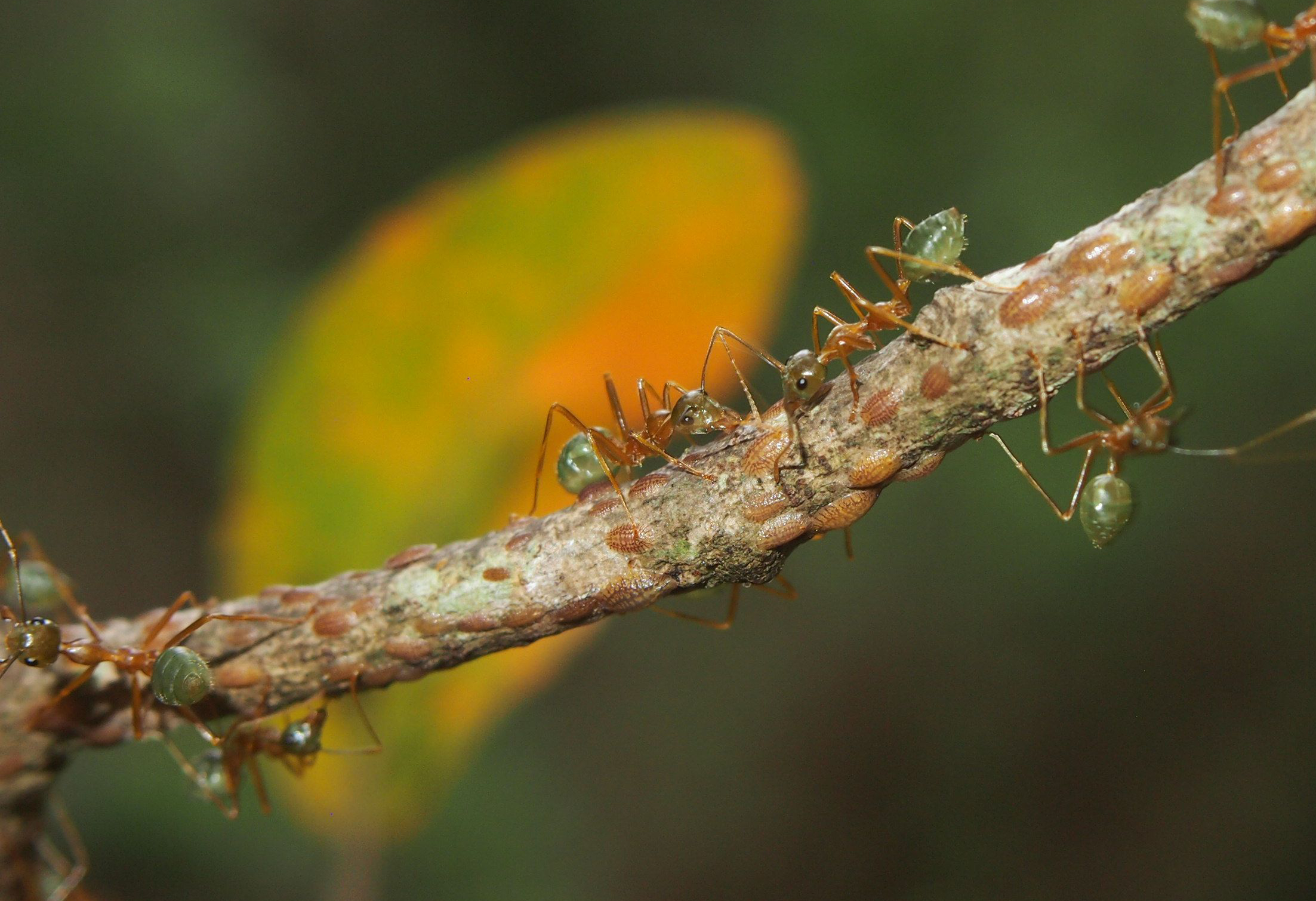
O. smaragdina tending scale insects

Large colonies of Oecophylla weaver ants consume significant amounts of food, and workers continuously kill a variety of arthropods (primarily other insects) close to their nests. Insects are not only consumed by workers, but this protein source is necessary for brood development. Because weaver ant workers hunt and kill insects that are potentially harmful plant pests, trees harboring weaver ants benefit from having decreased levels of herbivory. They have traditionally been used in biological control in Chinese and Southeast Asian citrus orchards from at least 400 AD. Many studies have shown the efficacy of using weaver ants as natural biocontrol agents against agricultural pests. The use of weaver ants as biocontrol agents has especially been effective for fruit agriculture, particularly in Australia and southeast Asia. Fruit trees harboring weaver ants produce higher quality fruits, show less leaf damage by herbivores, and require fewer applications of synthetic pesticides. They do on the other hand protect the scale insects which they 'milk' for honeydew. In several cases the use of weaver ants has nonetheless been shown to be more efficient than applying chemical insecticides and at the same time cheaper, leaving farmers with increased net incomes and more sustainable pest control.

Weaver ant husbandry is often practiced in Southeast Asia, where farmers provide shelter, food and construct ropes between trees populated with weaver ants in order to protect their colonies from potential competitors.

Oecophylla colonies may not be entirely beneficial to the host plants. Studies indicate that the presence of Oecophylla colonies may also have negative effects on the performance of host plants by reducing fruit removal by mammals and birds and therefore reducing seed dispersal and by lowering the flower-visiting rate of flying insects including pollinators. Weaver ants also have an adverse effect on tree productivity by protecting sap feeding insects such as scale insects and leafhoppers from which they collect honeydew. By protecting these insects from predators they increase their population and increase the damage they cause to trees.

=== As food, feed and medicine ===
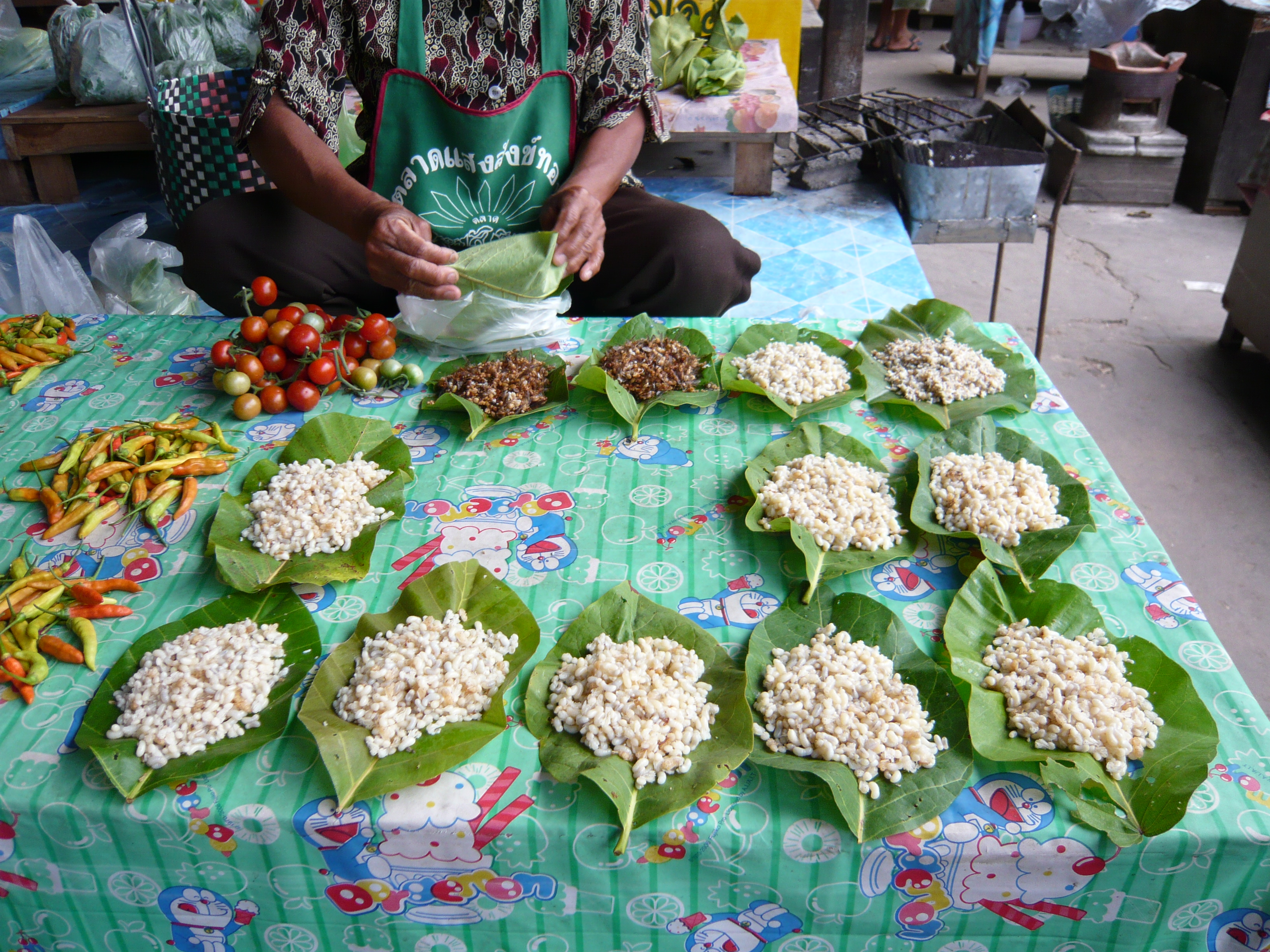
Leaf packets of larvae in Isaan typically sell for about 20 Thai Baht each (about 0.65 USD)

Weaver ants are one of the most valued types of edible insects consumed by humans (human entomophagy). In addition to being used as a biological control agent to increase plant production, weaver ants can be utilized directly as a protein and food source since the ants (especially the ant larvae) are edible for humans and high in protein and fatty acids. In some countries the weaver ant is a highly prized delicacy harvested in vast amounts and in this way contribute to local socio-economics. In Northeastern Thailand the price of weaver ant larvae is twice the price of good-quality beef and in a single Thai province ant larvae worth US$620,000 are harvested every year. It has furthermore been shown that the harvest of weaver ants can be maintained while at the same time using the ants for biocontrol of pest insects in tropical plantations, since the queen larvae and pupae that are the primary target of harvest, are not vital for colony survival.

The larvae of weaver ants are also collected commercially as an expensive feed for insect-eating birds in Indonesia.

In India and China, the worker ants are used in traditional medicine.

== See also ==
- Camponotus textor, a New World weaver ant, sometimes called the Brazilian weaver ant
- Myrmarachne plataleoides, a spider that mimics the weaver ant
- Nanfang Caomu Zhuang, earliest Chinese record of O. smaragdina "citrus ants" protecting orange crops
- Non-human agriculture
- Polyrhachis, other ants that weave nests (though less complex)
- Where the Green Ants Dream, a 1984 film directed by Werner Herzog
