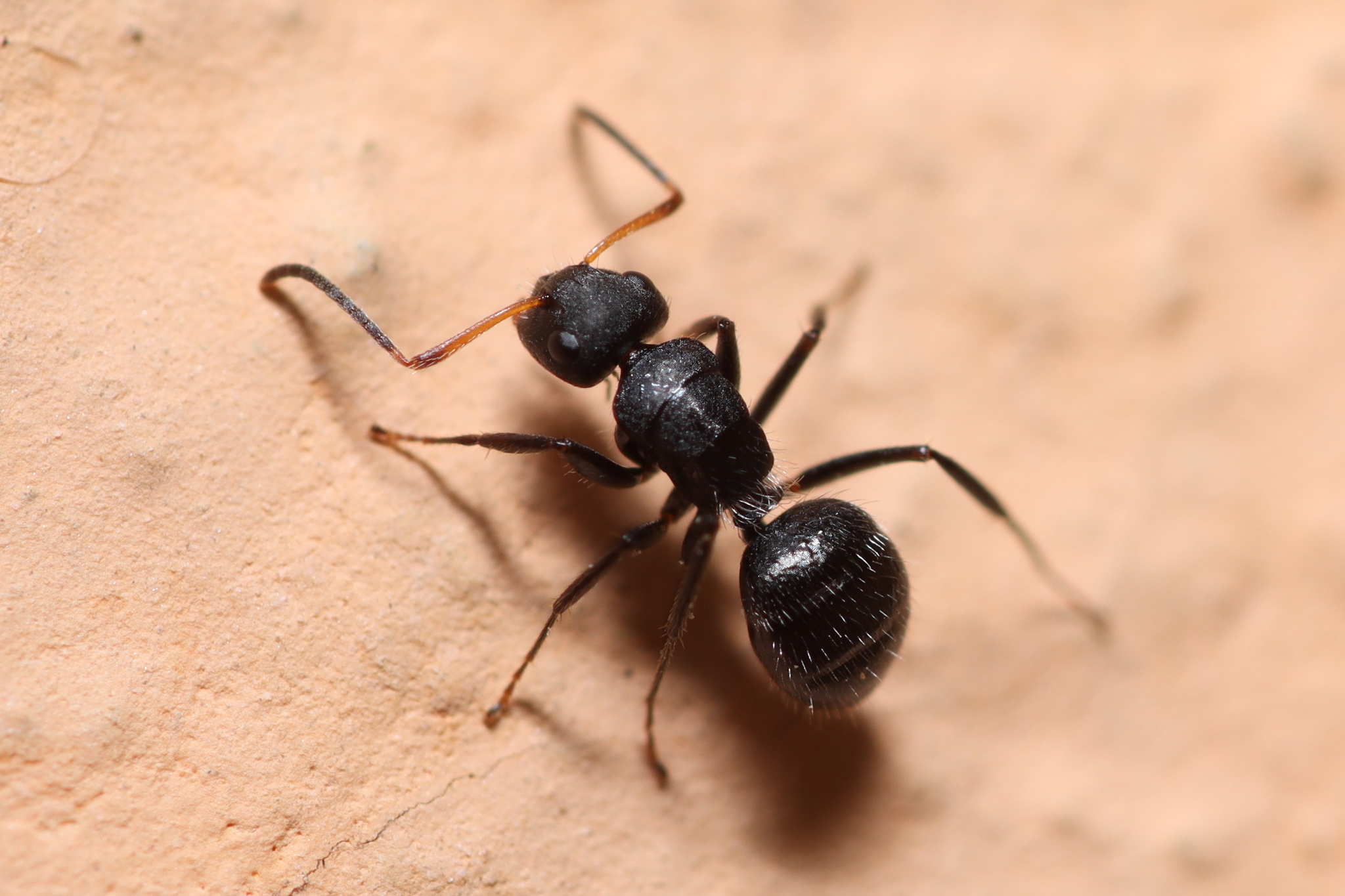

Scientific classification
- Domain: Eukaryota
- Kingdom: Animalia
- Phylum: Arthropoda
- Class: Insecta
- Order: Hymenoptera
- Family: Formicidae
- Subfamily: Formicinae
- Genus: Camponotus
- Subgenus: Myrmobrachys
- Species: C. senex

Binomial name
- Camponotus senex Smith, 1858

= Camponotus senex =

Species of ant

Camponotus senex is a fairly common species of weaver ant from the New World. They are opportunistic cavity-dwellers, semi-nomadic carpenter ants which are found around grasslands in Central and South America. It is taxonomically believed to be a complex of cryptic species and was previously considered synonymous with Camponotus textor which once included a distantly-related species of weaver-ant.

== Ecology ==
C. senex are medium-sized and agile, and can be frequently found inside the abandoned outer crusts of termite nests. They can inflict a respectable bite when handled carelessly. They are, however, not aggressive, and their nests tend to be sparse and mainly composed of satellite, queenless temporary nests under stones or bark. Very little is known about their biology as C. senex remains a poorly studied species, in spite of being so common.

The development of C. senex undergoes four larval instars. The larvae are typical Camponotus larvae: plump and hairy larvae that will spin a cocoon. They contain anchor-tipped dorsal hairs when mature, which may signals for a morphological adaptation to be hung inside the ant nest. They are the only ants apart from fire ants to present solenopsin alkaloids in their venom.
