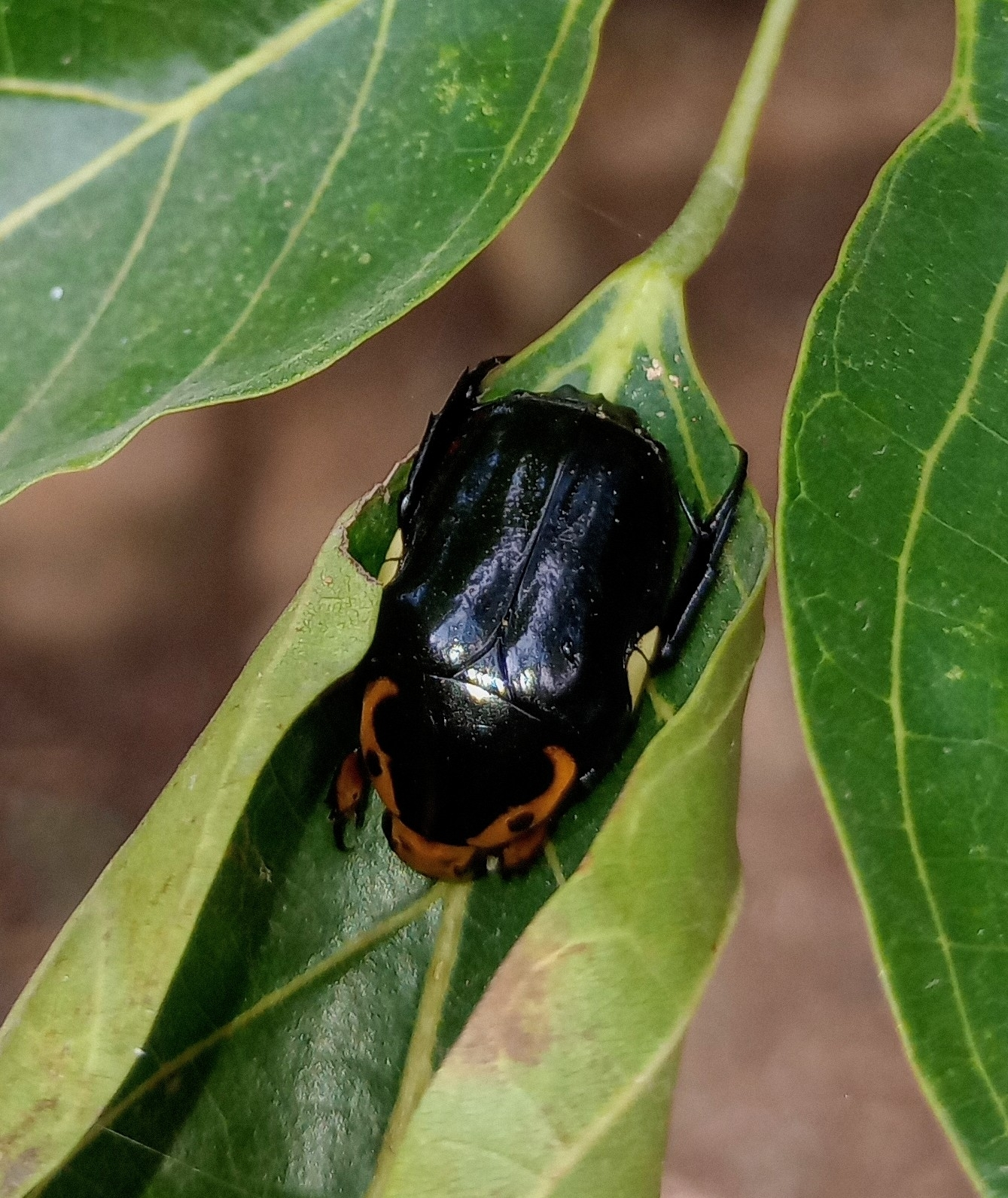
- Campsiura nigripennis, India

Scientific classification
- Kingdom: Animalia
- Phylum: Arthropoda
- Clade: Pancrustacea
- Class: Insecta
- Order: Coleoptera
- Suborder: Polyphaga
- Infraorder: Scarabaeiformia
- Family: Scarabaeidae
- Subfamily: Cetoniinae
- Tribe: Cremastocheilini
- Subtribe: Macromina
- Genus: Campsiura
- Species: C. unicornis

Binomial name
- Campsiura unicornis (Schaum, 1841)

Synonyms
- Macroma nigripennis Schaum, 1841

= Campsiura nigripennis =

Species of beetle

Campsiura nigripennis, is a species of dung beetle found in India, Sri Lanka, Myanmar, Malaysia, Indonesia, Thailand, Vietnam, Hong Kong and Southern China.

== Biology ==
Adult females fly to elephant dung for oviposition and lay eggs on the dung. Larval stages then grow inside elephant dung by constructing ovoid cocoons. After the pupation, adults emerged after about a month. In addition, adults are also known to attack arboreal nests of Oecophylla smaragdina. In India, adults frequently nests of the wasp, Ropalidia montana, the first record that a cetoniid species observed to have an association with a social insect.

== Subspecies ==
Four subspecies has been recorded:

- Campsiura nigripennis cingalensis (Arrow, 1910)
- Campsiura nigripennis maculicollis (Westwood, 1874)
- Campsiura nigripennis nigripennis Schaum, 1841
- Campsiura nigripennis sumatrana Legrand, 2012
