= Genuchinus ineptus =

Scientific classification
- Domain: Eukaryota
- Kingdom: Animalia
- Phylum: Arthropoda
- Class: Insecta
- Order: Coleoptera
- Suborder: Polyphaga
- Infraorder: Scarabaeiformia
- Family: Scarabaeidae
- Genus: Genuchinus
- Species: G. ineptus

Binomial name
- Genuchinus ineptus (Horn, 1885)

Synonyms
- Genuchinus angustus Casey, 1915

Species of beetle

Genuchinus ineptus is a species of myermecophilic beetle in the family Scarabaeidae.
