= Genuchinus =

Scientific classification
- Domain: Eukaryota
- Kingdom: Animalia
- Phylum: Arthropoda
- Class: Insecta
- Order: Coleoptera
- Suborder: Polyphaga
- Infraorder: Scarabaeiformia
- Family: Scarabaeidae
- Tribe: Cremastocheilini
- Genus: Genuchinus; Westwood, 1874

Genus of beetles

Genuchinus is a genus of myermecophilic beetles in the family Scarabaeidae. There are about 10 described species in Genuchinus.

== Species ==
These 10 species belong to the genus Genuchinus:

- Genuchinus digitatus Krikken, 1981
- Genuchinus ineptus (Horn, 1885)
- Genuchinus moroni Martinez, 1992
- Genuchinus muzo Krikken, 1981
- Genuchinus nevermanni Schauer, 1935
- Genuchinus parvulus Krikken, 1981
- Genuchinus peruanus Moser, 1910
- Genuchinus sulcipennis Westwood, 1874
- Genuchinus velutinus Westwood, 1874
- Genuchinus v-notatum Westwood, 1874
