= Cremastocheilus hirsutus =

Scientific classification
- Domain: Eukaryota
- Kingdom: Animalia
- Phylum: Arthropoda
- Class: Insecta
- Order: Coleoptera
- Suborder: Polyphaga
- Infraorder: Scarabaeiformia
- Family: Scarabaeidae
- Genus: Cremastocheilus
- Species: C. hirsutus

Binomial name
- Cremastocheilus hirsutus Van Dyke, 1918

Species of beetle

Cremastocheilus hirsutus is a species of scarab beetle in the family Scarabaeidae.
