= Lissomelas =

Scientific classification
- Domain: Eukaryota
- Kingdom: Animalia
- Phylum: Arthropoda
- Class: Insecta
- Order: Coleoptera
- Suborder: Polyphaga
- Infraorder: Scarabaeiformia
- Family: Scarabaeidae
- Subfamily: Cetoniinae
- Tribe: Cremastocheilini
- Genus: Lissomelas; Bates, 1889
- Species: L. flohri

Binomial name
- Lissomelas flohri Bates, 1889

Synonyms
- Genuchinus grandis Van Dyke 1952

Species of beetles

Lissomelas is a genus of myermecophilic beetles in the family Scarabaeidae, containing a single described species, L. flohri.
