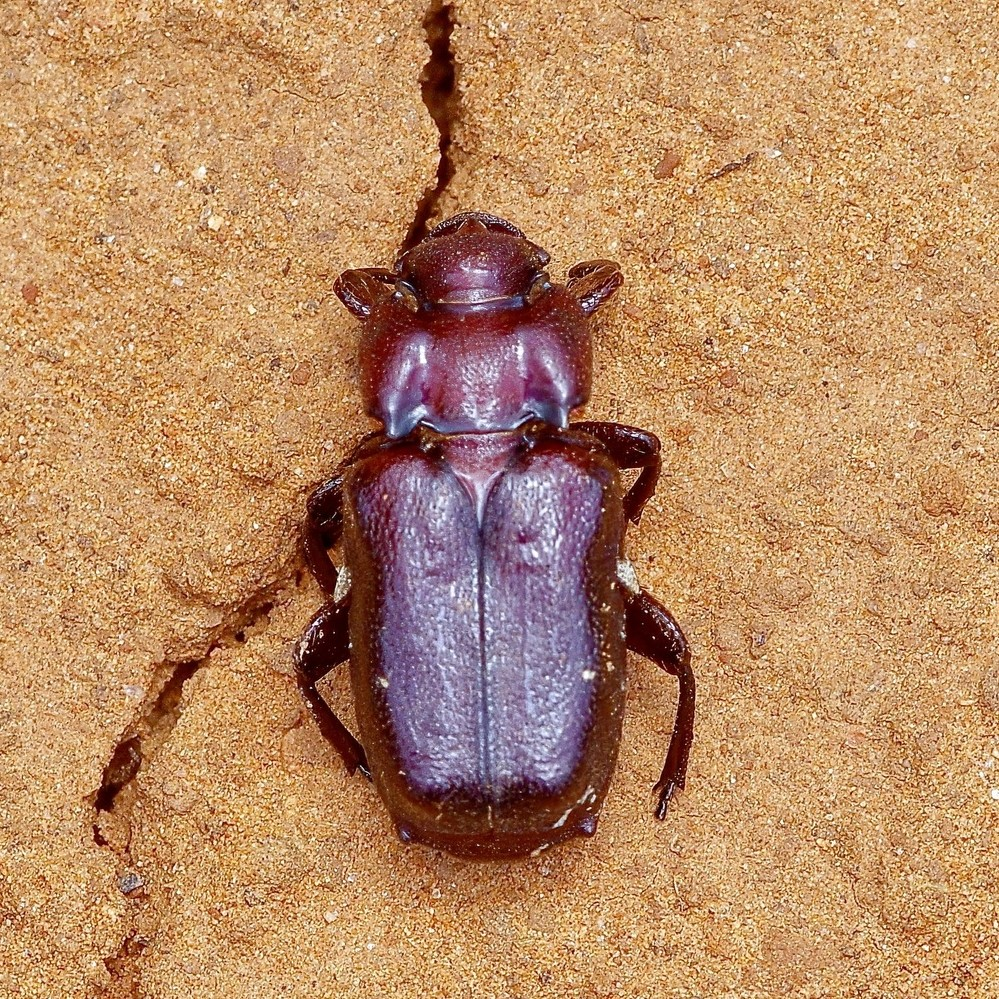

Scientific classification
- Kingdom: Animalia
- Phylum: Arthropoda
- Clade: Pancrustacea
- Class: Insecta
- Order: Coleoptera
- Suborder: Polyphaga
- Infraorder: Scarabaeiformia
- Family: Scarabaeidae
- Genus: Cremastocheilus
- Species: C. quadricollis

Binomial name
- Cremastocheilus quadricollis (Casey, 1915)

= Cremastocheilus quadricollis =

Species of beetle

Cremastocheilus quadricollis is a species of scarab beetle in the family Scarabaeidae.
