= Cremastocheilus schaumii =

Scientific classification
- Domain: Eukaryota
- Kingdom: Animalia
- Phylum: Arthropoda
- Class: Insecta
- Order: Coleoptera
- Suborder: Polyphaga
- Infraorder: Scarabaeiformia
- Family: Scarabaeidae
- Genus: Cremastocheilus
- Species: C. schaumii

Binomial name
- Cremastocheilus schaumii LeConte, 1853

Species of beetle

Cremastocheilus schaumii is a species of scarab beetle in the family Scarabaeidae.

== Subspecies ==
These two subspecies belong to the species Cremastocheilus schaumii:

- Cremastocheilus schaumii schaumii LeConte, 1853
- Cremastocheilus schaumii tibialis Casey, 1915
