= Cremastocheilus canaliculatus =

Scientific classification
- Domain: Eukaryota
- Kingdom: Animalia
- Phylum: Arthropoda
- Class: Insecta
- Order: Coleoptera
- Suborder: Polyphaga
- Infraorder: Scarabaeiformia
- Family: Scarabaeidae
- Genus: Cremastocheilus
- Species: C. canaliculatus

Binomial name
- Cremastocheilus canaliculatus Kirby, 1827

Synonyms
- Cremastocheilus hentzii Harris, 1827

Species of beetle

Cremastocheilus canaliculatus is a species of scarab beetle in the family Scarabaeidae. It is found in North America.
