= Cremastocheilus castaneae =

Scientific classification
- Domain: Eukaryota
- Kingdom: Animalia
- Phylum: Arthropoda
- Class: Insecta
- Order: Coleoptera
- Suborder: Polyphaga
- Infraorder: Scarabaeiformia
- Family: Scarabaeidae
- Genus: Cremastocheilus
- Species: C. castaneae

Binomial name
- Cremastocheilus castaneae Knoch, 1801

Species of beetle

Cremastocheilus castaneae is a species of scarab beetle in the family Scarabaeidae.

== Subspecies ==
These four subspecies belong to the species Cremastocheilus castaneae:

- Cremastocheilus castaneae brevisetosus Casey, 1915
- Cremastocheilus castaneae castaneae Knoch, 1801
- Cremastocheilus castaneae lecontei Westwood, 1874
- Cremastocheilus castaneae pocularis Casey, 1915
