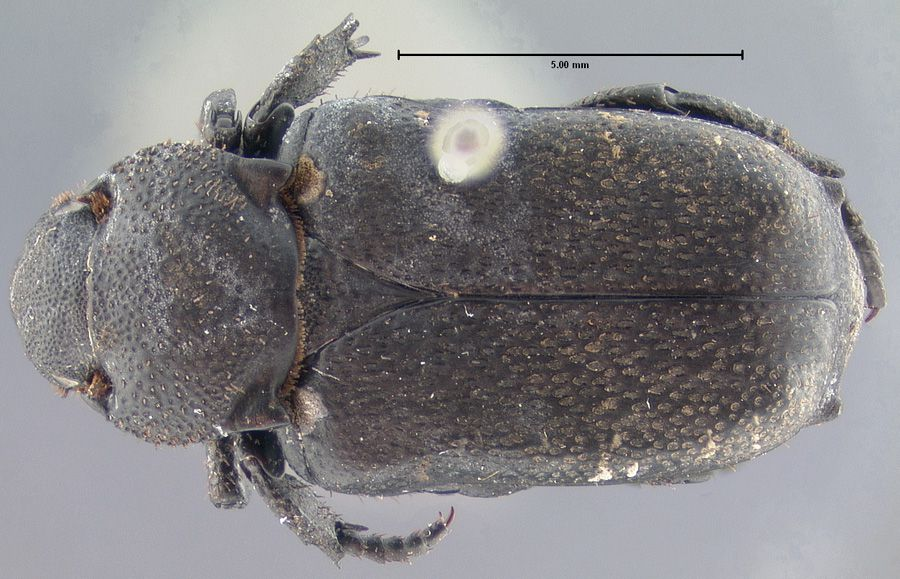

Scientific classification
- Domain: Eukaryota
- Kingdom: Animalia
- Phylum: Arthropoda
- Class: Insecta
- Order: Coleoptera
- Suborder: Polyphaga
- Infraorder: Scarabaeiformia
- Family: Scarabaeidae
- Genus: Cremastocheilus
- Species: C. angularis

Binomial name
- Cremastocheilus angularis Leconte, 1857

= Cremastocheilus angularis =

Species of beetle

Cremastocheilus angularis is a species of scarab beetle in the family Scarabaeidae.
