= Cremastocheilus retractus =

Scientific classification
- Kingdom: Animalia
- Phylum: Arthropoda
- Class: Insecta
- Order: Coleoptera
- Suborder: Polyphaga
- Infraorder: Scarabaeiformia
- Family: Scarabaeidae
- Genus: Cremastocheilus
- Species: C. retractus

Binomial name
- Cremastocheilus retractus Leconte, 1874

Species of beetle

Cremastocheilus retractus is a species of scarab beetle in the family Scarabaeidae.

== Subspecies ==
These two subspecies belong to the species Cremastocheilus retractus:

- Cremastocheilus retractus incisus Casey, 1915
- Cremastocheilus retractus retractus LeConte, 1874
