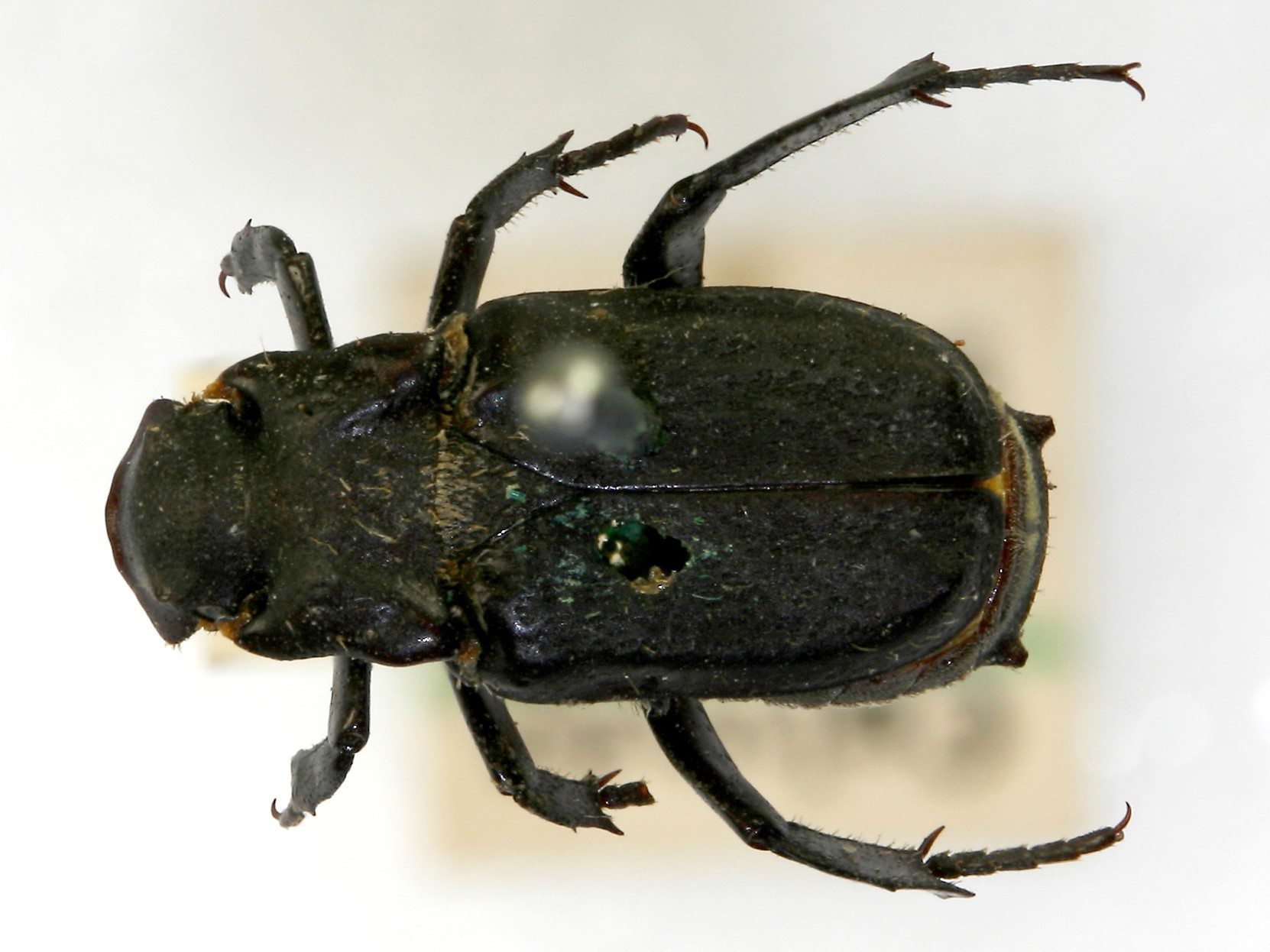

Scientific classification
- Kingdom: Animalia
- Phylum: Arthropoda
- Class: Insecta
- Order: Coleoptera
- Suborder: Polyphaga
- Infraorder: Scarabaeiformia
- Family: Scarabaeidae
- Genus: Cremastocheilus
- Species: C. wheeleri

Binomial name
- Cremastocheilus wheeleri LeConte, 1876

= Cremastocheilus wheeleri =

Species of beetle

Cremastocheilus wheeleri is a species of scarab beetle in the family Scarabaeidae. It is found in North America.
