= Cremastocheilus saucius =

Scientific classification
- Domain: Eukaryota
- Kingdom: Animalia
- Phylum: Arthropoda
- Class: Insecta
- Order: Coleoptera
- Suborder: Polyphaga
- Infraorder: Scarabaeiformia
- Family: Scarabaeidae
- Genus: Cremastocheilus
- Species: C. saucius

Binomial name
- Cremastocheilus saucius Leconte, 1858

Species of beetle

Cremastocheilus saucius is a species of anteater scarab beetles in the family Scarabaeidae.
