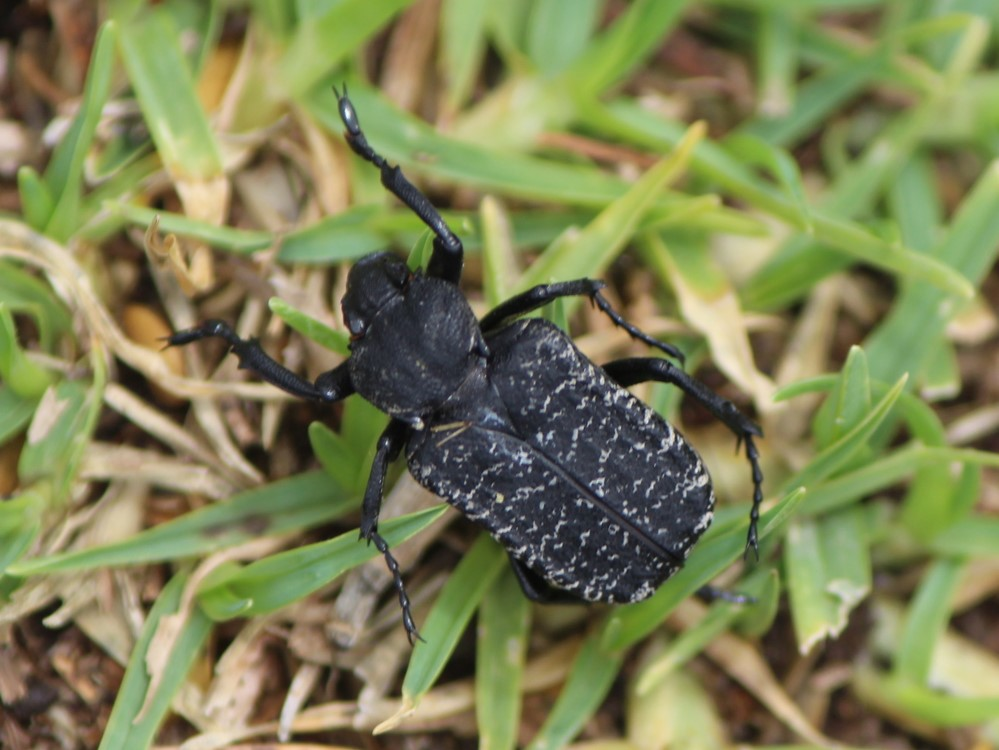

Scientific classification
- Kingdom: Animalia
- Phylum: Arthropoda
- Class: Insecta
- Order: Coleoptera
- Suborder: Polyphaga
- Infraorder: Scarabaeiformia
- Family: Scarabaeidae
- Genus: Cremastocheilus
- Species: C. planatus

Binomial name
- Cremastocheilus planatus Leconte, 1863

= Cremastocheilus planatus =

Species of beetle

Cremastocheilus planatus is a species of scarab beetle in the family Scarabaeidae.
