= Cremastocheilus mexicanus =

Scientific classification
- Domain: Eukaryota
- Kingdom: Animalia
- Phylum: Arthropoda
- Class: Insecta
- Order: Coleoptera
- Suborder: Polyphaga
- Infraorder: Scarabaeiformia
- Family: Scarabaeidae
- Genus: Cremastocheilus
- Species: C. mexicanus

Binomial name
- Cremastocheilus mexicanus Schaum, 1841

Synonyms
- Cremastocheilus villadae Dugés, 1879

Species of beetle

Cremastocheilus mexicanus is a species of scarab beetle in the family Scarabaeidae.
