= Cremastocheilus lengi =

Scientific classification
- Kingdom: Animalia
- Phylum: Arthropoda
- Class: Insecta
- Order: Coleoptera
- Suborder: Polyphaga
- Infraorder: Scarabaeiformia
- Family: Scarabaeidae
- Genus: Cremastocheilus
- Species: C. lengi

Binomial name
- Cremastocheilus lengi Cazier, 1940

Species of beetle

Cremastocheilus lengi is a species of scarab beetle in the family Scarabaeidae.
