= Psilocnemis =

Scientific classification
- Kingdom: Animalia
- Phylum: Arthropoda
- Class: Insecta
- Order: Coleoptera
- Suborder: Polyphaga
- Infraorder: Scarabaeiformia
- Family: Scarabaeidae
- Subfamily: Cetoniinae
- Tribe: Cremastocheilini
- Genus: Psilocnemis; Burmeister, 1842
- Species: P. leucosticta

Binomial name
- Psilocnemis leucosticta Burmeister, 1842

Synonyms
- Genuchinus grandis Van Dyke 1952

Species of beetles

Psilocnemis is a genus of myermecophilic beetles in the family Scarabaeidae, containing a single described species, P. leucosticta.
