= Cremastocheilus knochii =

Scientific classification
- Domain: Eukaryota
- Kingdom: Animalia
- Phylum: Arthropoda
- Class: Insecta
- Order: Coleoptera
- Suborder: Polyphaga
- Infraorder: Scarabaeiformia
- Family: Scarabaeidae
- Genus: Cremastocheilus
- Species: C. knochii

Binomial name
- Cremastocheilus knochii LECONTE, 1853

Synonyms
- Cremastocheilus areolatus Casey, 1915; Cremastocheilus crenicollis Westwood, 1874; Cremastocheilus gracilipes Casey, 1915

Species of beetle

Cremastocheilus knochii is a species of scarab beetle in the family Scarabaeidae.
