= Cremastocheilus squamulosus =

Scientific classification
- Domain: Eukaryota
- Kingdom: Animalia
- Phylum: Arthropoda
- Class: Insecta
- Order: Coleoptera
- Suborder: Polyphaga
- Infraorder: Scarabaeiformia
- Family: Scarabaeidae
- Genus: Cremastocheilus
- Species: C. squamulosus

Binomial name
- Cremastocheilus squamulosus Leconte, 1858

Synonyms
- Cremastocheilus junior Westwood, 1874

Species of beetle

Cremastocheilus squamulosus is a species of scarab beetle in the family Scarabaeidae.
