= Cremastocheilus armatus =

Scientific classification
- Kingdom: Animalia
- Phylum: Arthropoda
- Class: Insecta
- Order: Coleoptera
- Suborder: Polyphaga
- Infraorder: Scarabaeiformia
- Family: Scarabaeidae
- Genus: Cremastocheilus
- Species: C. armatus

Binomial name
- Cremastocheilus armatus Walker, 1866

Species of beetle

Cremastocheilus armatus is a species of fruit or flower chafer in the family Scarabaeidae.

== Subspecies ==
- Cremastocheilus armatus armatus Walker, 1866
- Cremastocheilus armatus cribripennis Casey, 1915
- Cremastocheilus armatus maritimus Casey, 1915
- Cremastocheilus armatus montanus CASEY, 1915
