= Cremastocheilus beameri =

Scientific classification
- Kingdom: Animalia
- Phylum: Arthropoda
- Class: Insecta
- Order: Coleoptera
- Suborder: Polyphaga
- Infraorder: Scarabaeiformia
- Family: Scarabaeidae
- Genus: Cremastocheilus
- Species: C. beameri

Binomial name
- Cremastocheilus beameri Cazier, 1940

Species of beetle

Cremastocheilus beameri is a species of scarab beetle in the family Scarabaeidae.

== Subspecies ==
These two subspecies belong to the species Cremastocheilus beameri:

- Cremastocheilus beameri beameri
- Cremastocheilus beameri pokorny Krajcik, 2014
