= Cremastocheilus crinitus =

Scientific classification
- Domain: Eukaryota
- Kingdom: Animalia
- Phylum: Arthropoda
- Class: Insecta
- Order: Coleoptera
- Suborder: Polyphaga
- Infraorder: Scarabaeiformia
- Family: Scarabaeidae
- Genus: Cremastocheilus
- Species: C. crinitus

Binomial name
- Cremastocheilus crinitus Leconte, 1874

Species of beetle

Cremastocheilus crinitus is a species of scarab beetle in the family Scarabaeidae.

== Subspecies ==
These three subspecies belong to the species Cremastocheilus crinitus:

- Cremastocheilus crinitus bifoveatus Van Dyke, 1918
- Cremastocheilus crinitus crinitus LeConte, 1874
- Cremastocheilus crinitus pugetanus Casey, 1915
