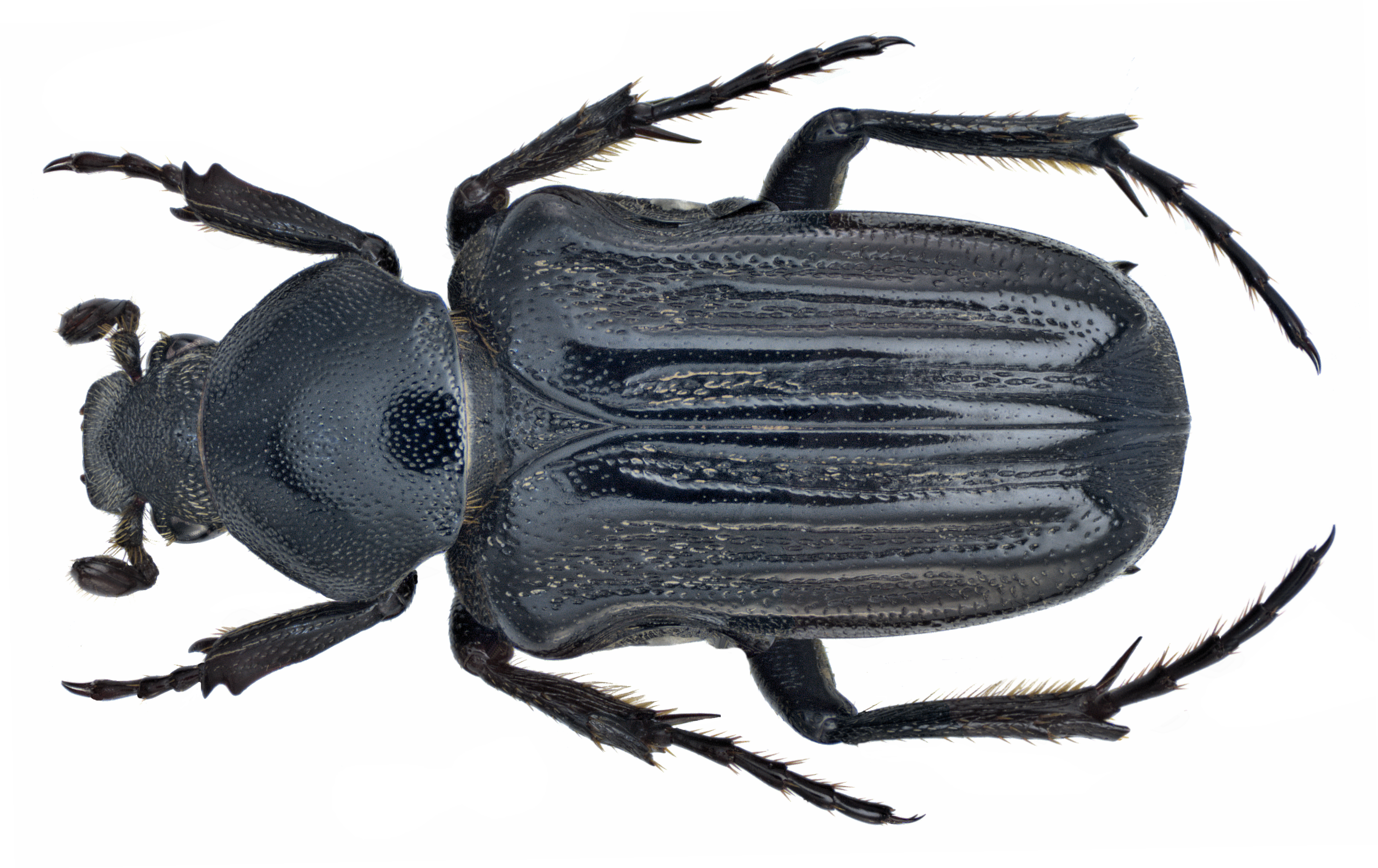
- Coenochilus striatus

Scientific classification
- Kingdom: Animalia
- Phylum: Arthropoda
- Class: Insecta
- Order: Coleoptera
- Suborder: Polyphaga
- Infraorder: Scarabaeiformia
- Family: Scarabaeidae
- Subfamily: Cetoniinae
- Tribe: Cremastocheilini; Burmeister & Schaum, 1841

= Cremastocheilini =

Tribe of beetles

Cremastocheilini is a tribe of scarab beetles in the family Scarabaeidae. There are about 50 genera in the tribe Cremastocheilini. Many beetles in this tribe are known to associate with ants and live within their nests.

== Genera ==
These 50 genera belong to the tribe Cremastocheilini:

Subtribe Aspilina Krikken, 1984
Aspilochilus Rojkoff, 2013
Aspilus Westwood, 1874
Protochilus Krikken, 1976
Subtribe Coenochilina Burmeister, 1842
Arielina Rossi, 1958
Astoxenus Péringuey, 1907
Basilewskynia Schein, 1957
Coenochilus Schaum, 1841
Subtribe Cremastocheilina Burmeister & Schaum, 1841
Centrochilus Krikken, 1976
Clinterocera Motschulsky, 1857
Cremastocheilus Knoch, 1801
Cyclidiellus Krikken, 1976
Cyclidinus Westwood, 1874
Cyclidius MacLeay, 1838
Genuchinus Westwood, 1874
Lissomelas Bates, 1889
Paracyclidius Howden, 1971
Platysodes Westwood, 1874
Psilocnemis Burmeister, 1842
Subtribe Cymophorina Krikken, 1984
Cymophorus Kirby, 1827
Myrmecochilus Wasmann, 1900
Rhagopteryx Burmeister, 1842
Subtribe Genuchina Krikken, 1984
Genuchus Kirby, 1825
Meurguesia Ruter, 1969
Problerhinus Deyrolle, 1864
Subtribe Goliathopsidina Krikken, 1984
Goliathopsis Janson, 1881
Subtribe Heterogeniina Krikken, 1984
Heterogenius Moser, 1911
Pseudastoxenus Bourgoin, 1921
Subtribe Lissogeniina Krikken, 1984
Chthonobius Burmeister, 1847
Lissogenius Schaum, 1844
Subtribe Macromina Burmeister & Schaum, 1842
Brachymacroma Kraatz, 1896
Campsiura Hope, 1831
Macromina Westwood, 1874
Pseudopilinurgus Moser, 1918
Subtribe Nyassinina Krikken, 1984
Nyassinus Westwood, 1879
Subtribe Oplostomina Krikken, 1984
Anatonochilus Péringuey, 1907
Oplostomus MacLeay, 1838
Placodidus Péringuey, 1900
Scaptobius Schaum, 1841
Subtribe Pilinurgina Krikken, 1984
Callynomes Mohnike, 1873
Centrognathus Guérin-Méneville, 1840
Parapilinurgus Arrow, 1910
Periphanesthes Kraatz, 1880
Pilinurgus Burmeister, 1842
Priska Jákl, 2018
Subtribe Spilophorina Krikken, 1984
Spilophorus Westwood, 1848
Subtribe Telochilina Krikken, 1984
Telochilus Krikken, 1975
Subtribe Trichoplina Krikken, 1984
Lecanoderus Kolbe, 1907
Trichoplus Burmeister, 1842
Subtribe Trogodina Krikken, 1984
Pseudoscaptobius Krikken, 1976
Trogodes Boheman, 1857
