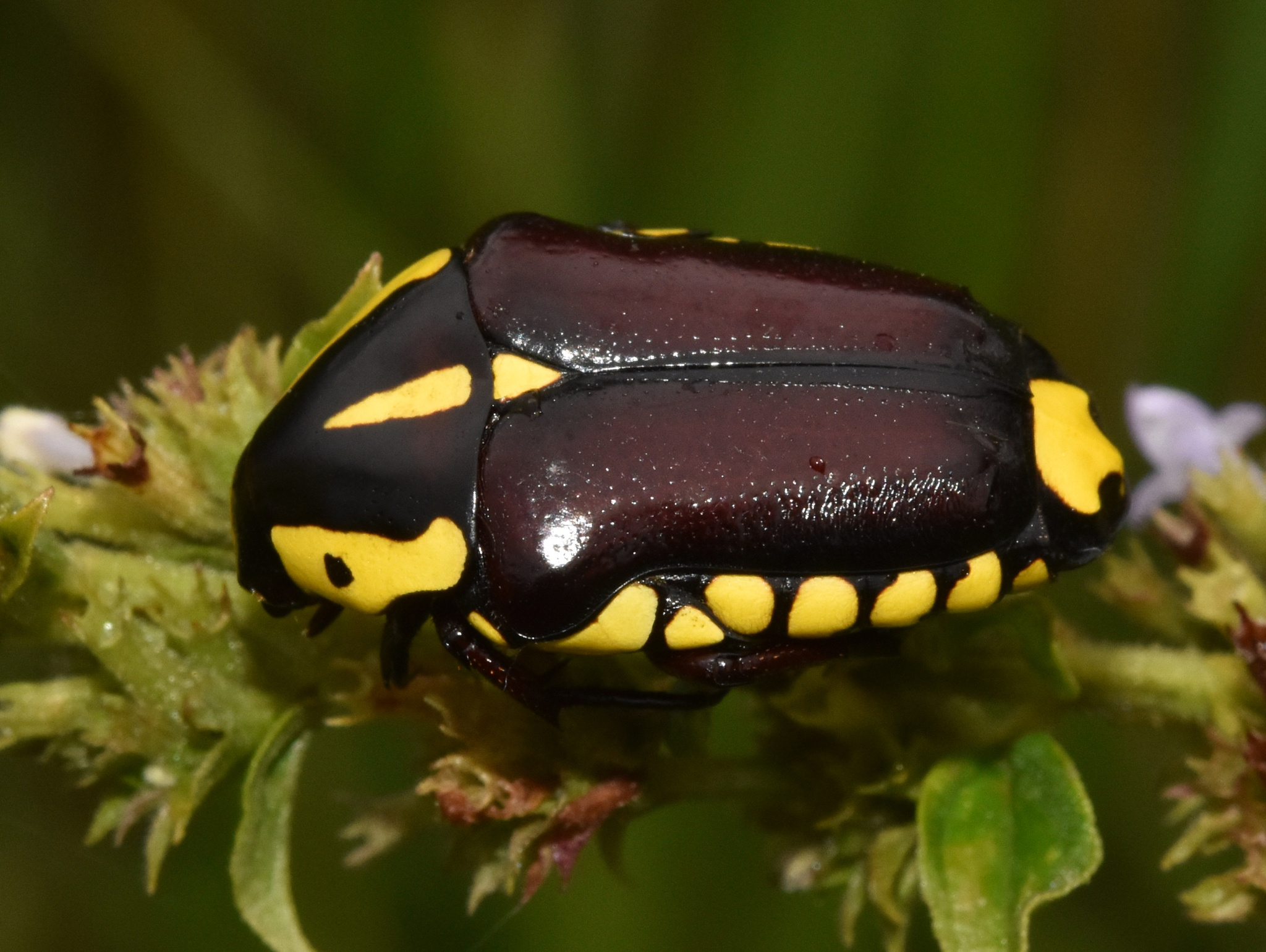
- Campsiura cognata, South Africa

Scientific classification
- Domain: Eukaryota
- Kingdom: Animalia
- Phylum: Arthropoda
- Class: Insecta
- Order: Coleoptera
- Suborder: Polyphaga
- Infraorder: Scarabaeiformia
- Family: Scarabaeidae
- Subfamily: Cetoniinae
- Tribe: Cremastocheilini
- Subtribe: Macromina
- Genus: Campsiura; Hope, 1831

Subgenera
- Calocampsiura Mikšić, 1986; Campsiura Hope, 1831; Eucampsiura Mikšić, 1986; Macroma Gory & Percheron, 1833

Synonyms
- Macroma Gory & Percheron, 1833

= Campsiura =

Genus of beetles

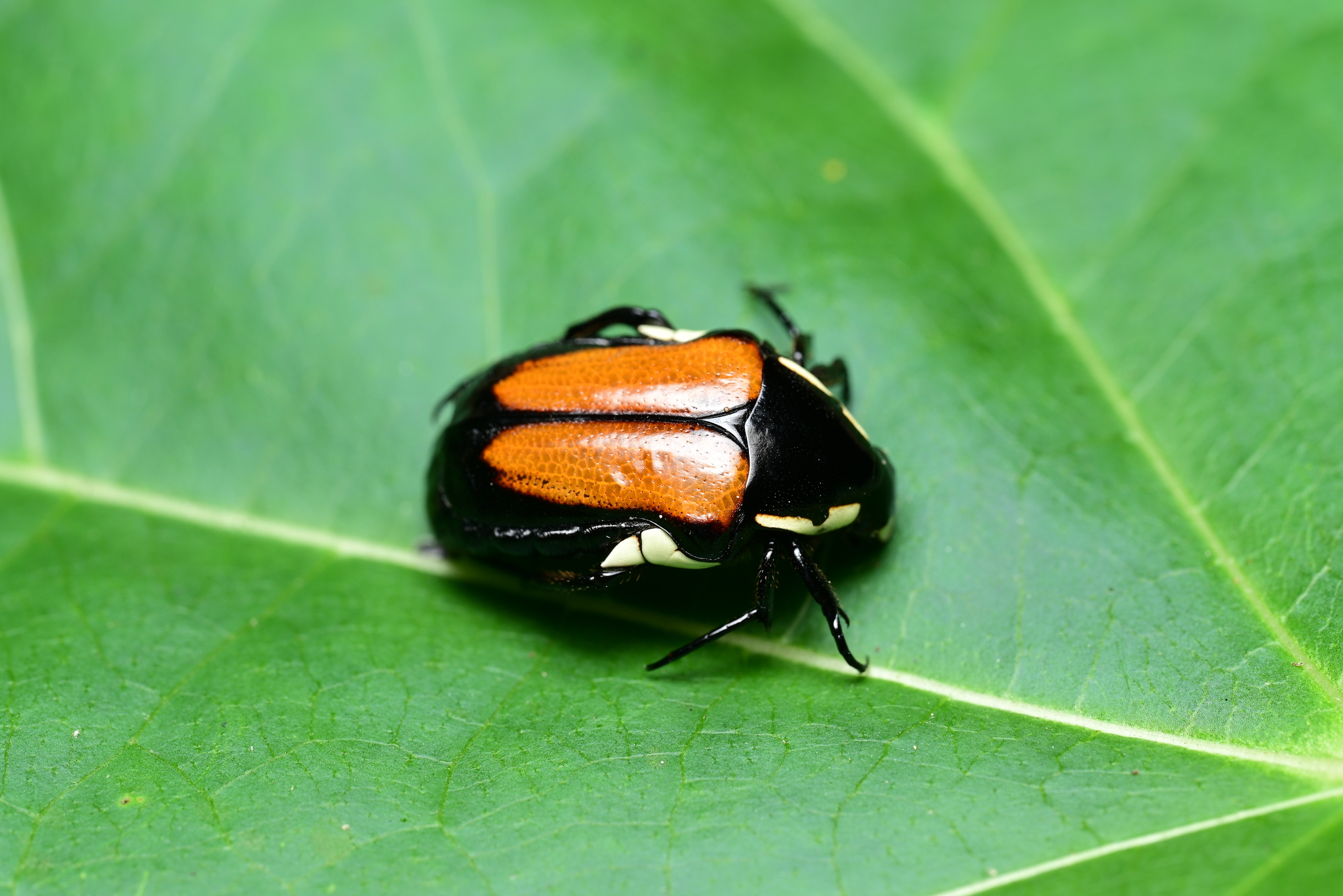
Campsiura mirabilis, China

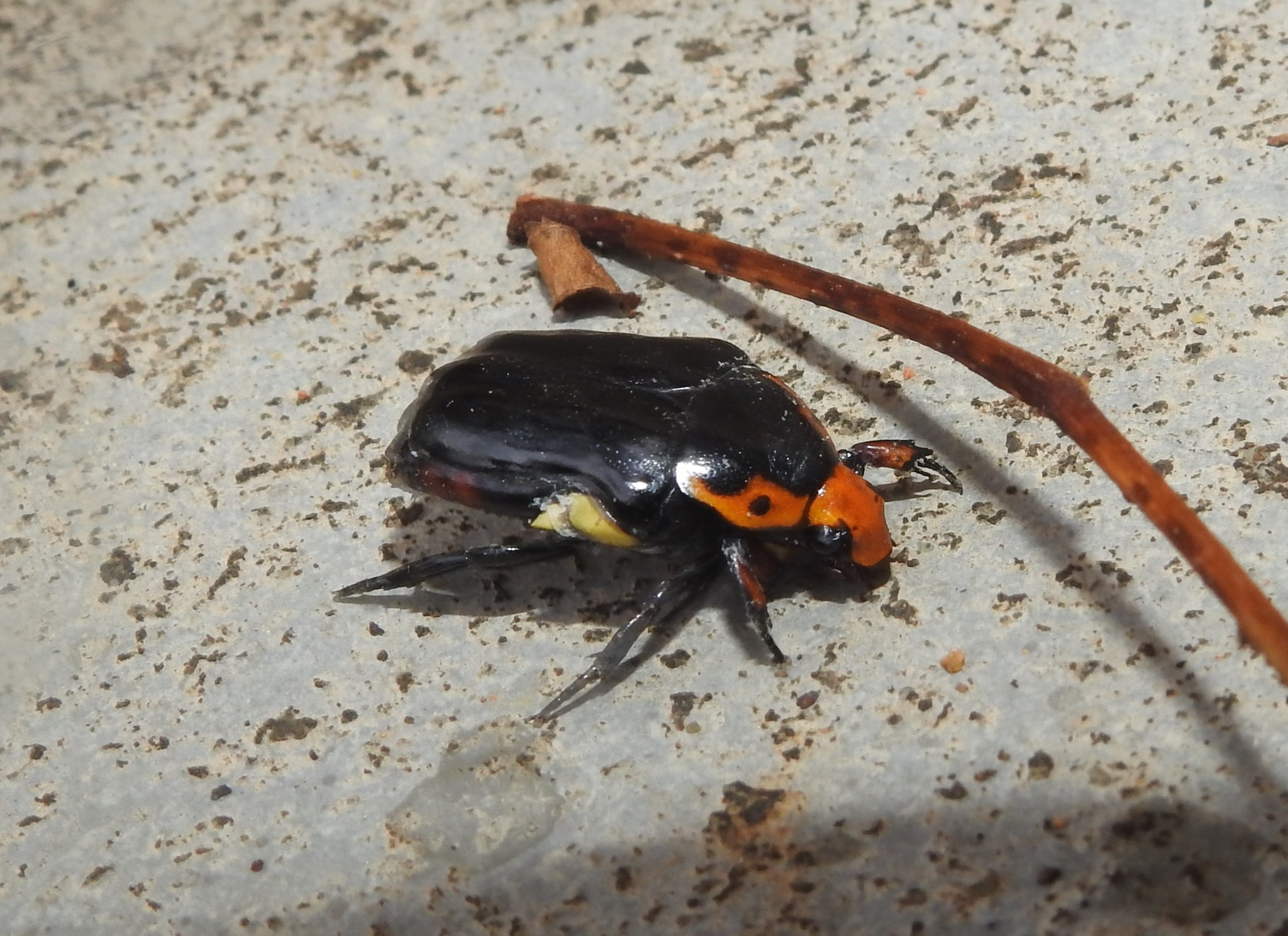
Campsiura javanica, India

Campsiura is a genus of beetles in the scarab beetle family Scarabaeidae. There are more than 30 described species in Campsiura, found in Africa and Asia.

== Species ==
These 33 species belong to the genus Campsiura:

- Campsiura abyssinica (Westwood, 1874)
- Campsiura angolensis (Kraatz, 1883)
- Campsiura bilineata (Buquet, 1836)
- Campsiura camarunica (Kolbe, 1892)
- Campsiura celebensis Krikken, 1977
- Campsiura circe (Kolbe, 1914)
- Campsiura cognata Schaum, 1841
- Campsiura congoensis (Bates, 1890)
- Campsiura exclamationis (Kolbe, 1892)
- Campsiura feistmanteli (Nonfried, 1892)
- Campsiura flavoguttata (Snellen van Vollenhoven, 1864)
- Campsiura gloriosa (Mohnike, 1871)
- Campsiura graueri (Moser, 1907)
- Campsiura insignis (Gestro, 1891)
- Campsiura javanica (Gory & Percheron, 1833)
- Campsiura kerleyi Antoine, 2006
- Campsiura lijingkei Legrand & Flutsch, 2007
- Campsiura lutescens Westwood, 1874
- Campsiura melanopus (Westwood, 1874)
- Campsiura mirabilis (Faldermann, 1835)
- Campsiura nigripennis (Schaum, 1841)
- Campsiura oberthuri (Janson, 1888)
- Campsiura ochreipennis (Fairmaire, 1887)
- Campsiura omisiena Heller, 1923
- Campsiura oslislyi Le Gall, 2023
- Campsiura pavlae Legrand & Malec, 2006
- Campsiura reflexa (Moser, 1913)
- Campsiura scutellaris (Gory & Percheron, 1833)
- Campsiura scutellata (Fabricius, 1801)
- Campsiura superba (Neervoort Van De Poll, 1889)
- Campsiura triguttulata (Mohnike, 1871)
- Campsiura trivittata (Moser, 1907)
- Campsiura xanthorhina Hope, 1831
