= Camponotus textor =

Scientific classification
- Domain: Eukaryota
- Kingdom: Animalia
- Phylum: Arthropoda
- Class: Insecta
- Order: Hymenoptera
- Family: Formicidae
- Subfamily: Formicinae
- Genus: Camponotus
- Subgenus: Myrmobrachys
- Species: C. textor

Binomial name
- Camponotus textor Forel, 1899

Species of ant

Camponotus textor, also known as Brazilian weaver ant, is a species of fairly common tree-dwelling ant native to South and Central America. It is believed to include a number of cryptic species, and previously were considered synonymous to the cavity-dwelling ant Camponotus senex, now thought to be only distantly-related.

== Ecology ==
C. textor nests can be found across a number of tree species in Brazil, and they're dominant species wherever they're found. These ants will aggressively defend their nests whenever disturbed, while workers will produce a fairly loud hissing sound through tapping inside their nest with their abdomens.

They undergo four larval instars during their development, and will pupate inside a cocoon. The last larval instar, mature larvae produce the silk used in spinning their nests, being held from behind by other workers. These hairy, plump larval have specialised hairs on their back armed with anchor-like projections at their tips, presumably for fixation onto nest walls. They are the only Camponotus ants registered to have traces of alkaloids in their venom.
