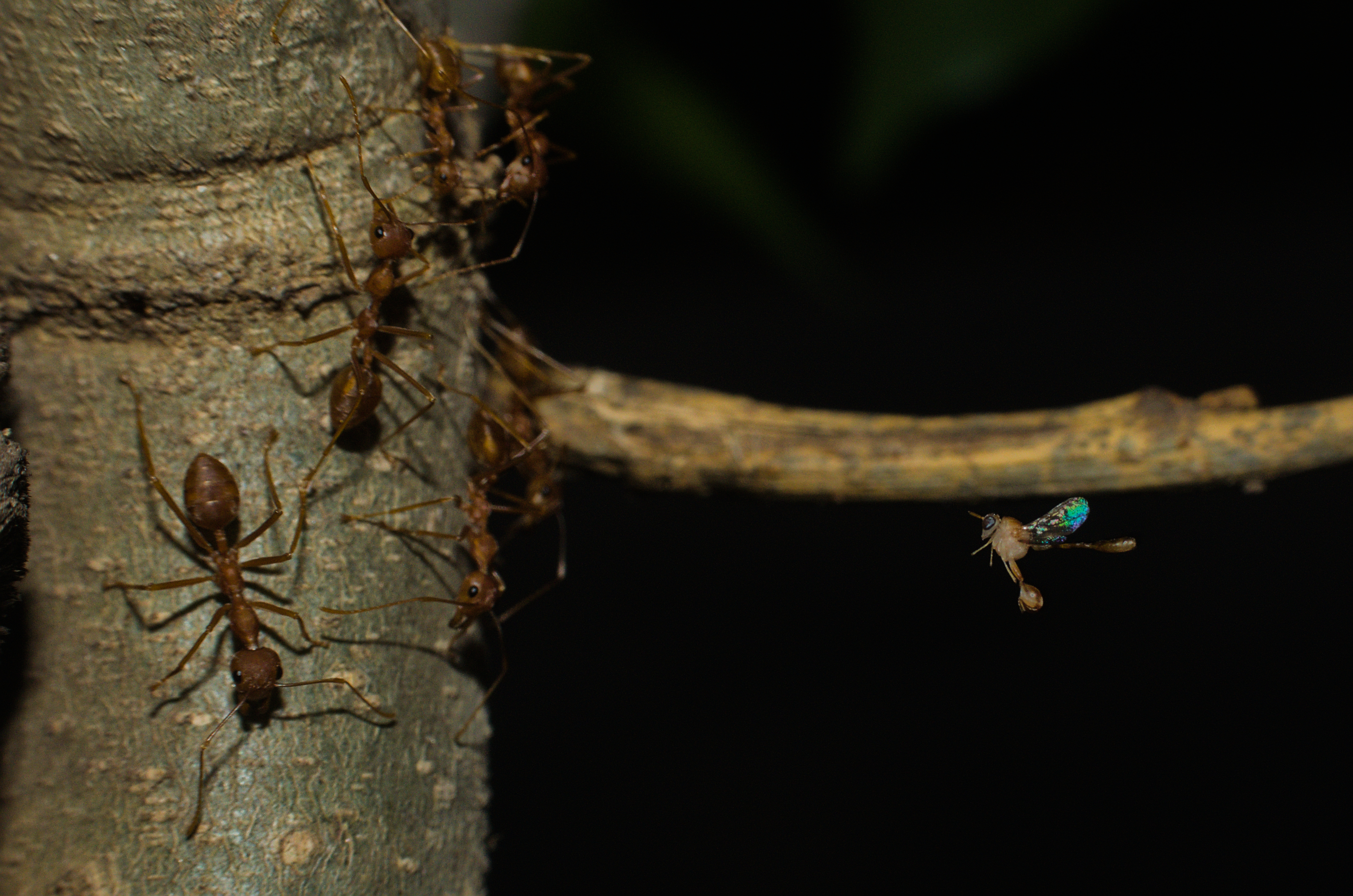

Scientific classification
- Kingdom: Animalia
- Phylum: Arthropoda
- Clade: Pancrustacea
- Class: Insecta
- Order: Hymenoptera
- Family: Chalcididae
- Tribe: Smicromorphini
- Genus: Smicromorpha; Girault, 1913

Type species
- Smicromorpha doddi Girault, 1913

= Smicromorpha =

Genus of wasps

Smicromorpha is a genus of parasitoid wasps of the Chalcididae family in the tribe Smicromorphini. This genus was created by Girault on the basis of Smicromorpha doddi and named after the entomologist Frederick Parkhurst Dodd who had collected specimens. Species in the genus are known to parasitize ants of the genus Oecophylla and pupae have been found inside the gaster of adult ants.

== Species ==
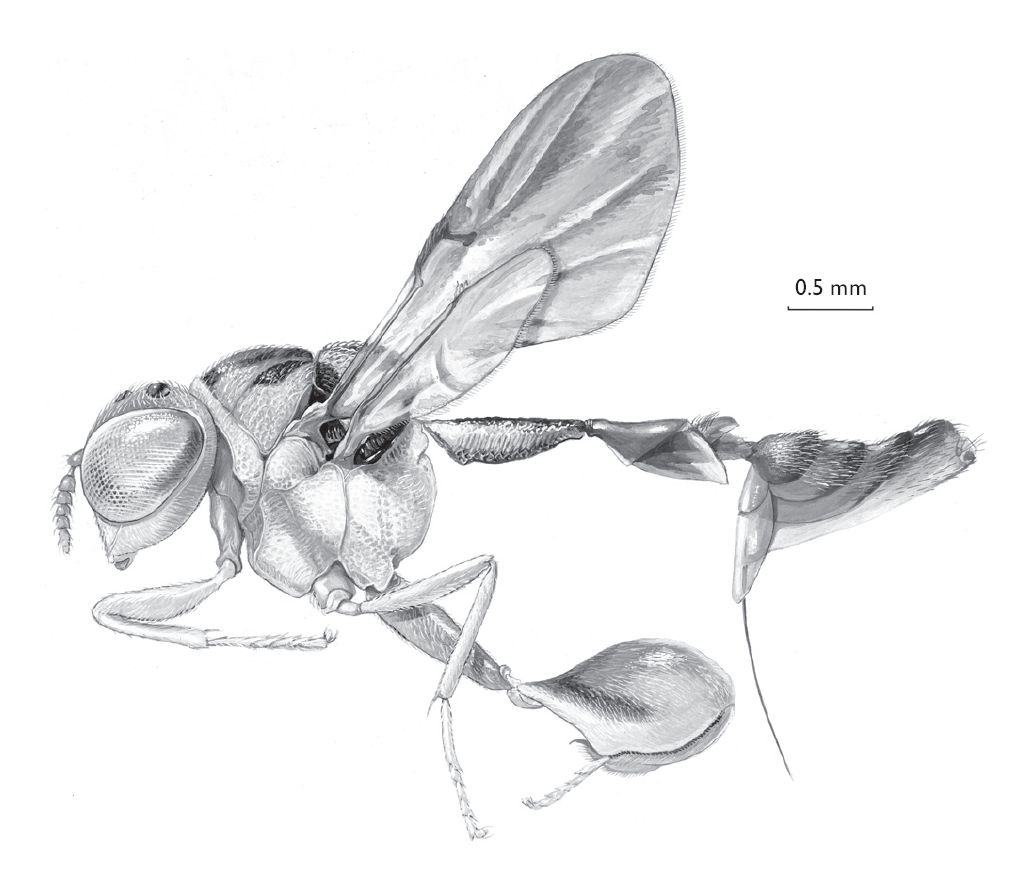
S. masneri

There are 8 described species with a distribution in Asia, Australia and Africa.

- Smicromorpha attenboroughi Binoy, Shreevihar & Nasser, 2021 - India
- Smicromorpha banksi Naumann, 1986 - Australia, Papua New Guinea
- Smicromorpha doddi Girault, 1913 - Australia
- Smicromorpha eudela Naumann, 1986 - Australia
- Smicromorpha keralensis Narendran, 1979 - India
- Smicromorpha lagynos Naumann, 1986 - Australia, Indonesia
- Smicromorpha masneri Darling, 2009 - Vietnam
- Smicromorpha minera Girault, 1926 - Australia
