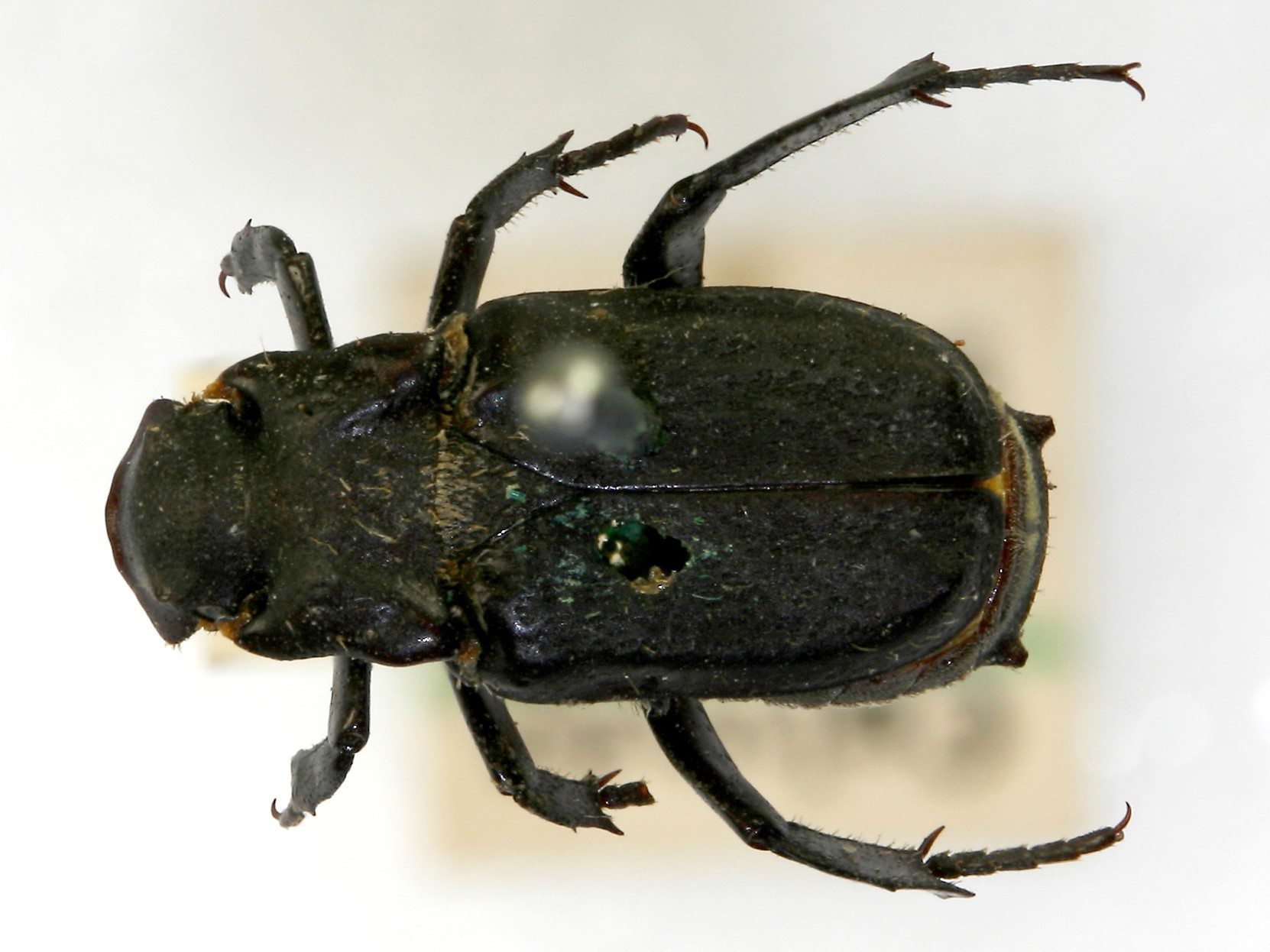
- Cremastocheilus wheeleri

Scientific classification
- Domain: Eukaryota
- Kingdom: Animalia
- Phylum: Arthropoda
- Class: Insecta
- Order: Coleoptera
- Suborder: Polyphaga
- Infraorder: Scarabaeiformia
- Family: Scarabaeidae
- Tribe: Cremastocheilini
- Genus: Cremastocheilus; Knoch, 1801

= Cremastocheilus =

Genus of beetles

Cremastocheilus is a genus of myrmecophilic beetles in the family Scarabaeidae. There are at least 40 described species in Cremastocheilus.

== See also ==
- List of Cremastocheilus species
