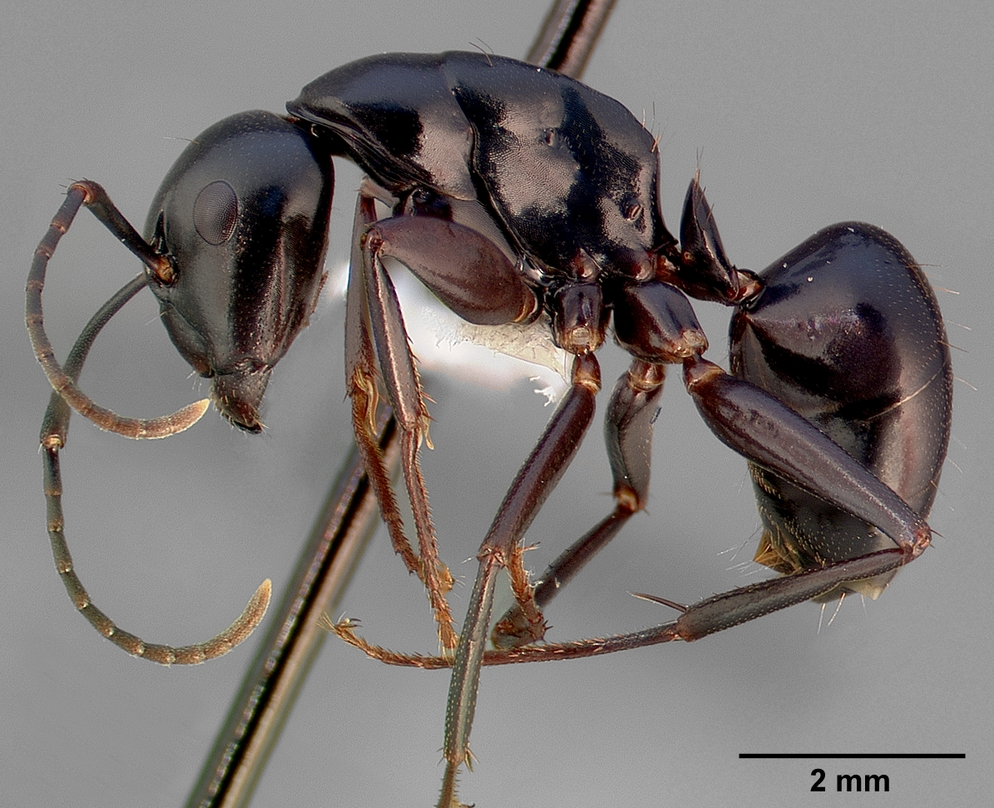

Scientific classification
- Domain: Eukaryota
- Kingdom: Animalia
- Phylum: Arthropoda
- Class: Insecta
- Order: Hymenoptera
- Family: Formicidae
- Subfamily: Formicinae
- Genus: Camponotus
- Subgenus: Camponotus
- Species: C. laevigatus

Binomial name
- Camponotus laevigatus (Smith, F., 1858)

Synonyms
- Formica laevigata Smith, F. 1858; Camponotus quercicola Smith, M.R. 1954

= Camponotus laevigatus =

Species of ant

Camponotus laevigatus, formerly Camponotus quercicola, is a species of carpenter ant native to California. It nests in the dead branches of oaks such as Quercus wislizeni (interior live oak).

The more widespread ant formerly called C. laevigatus is now Camponotus laevissimus. According to AntWiki, "most literature (probably except for the original description) as well as specimens in museums labelled as C. laevigatus actually refer to C. laevissimus."
