= Quercus × morehus =

- Quercus morehus Kellogg

Scientific classification
- Kingdom: Plantae
- Clade: Tracheophytes
- Clade: Angiosperms
- Clade: Eudicots
- Clade: Rosids
- Order: Fagales
- Family: Fagaceae
- Genus: Quercus
- Section: Quercus sect. Lobatae
- Species: Q. × morehus

Binomial name
- Quercus × morehus Kellogg

Synonyms
- Quercus ×moreha Trel.

Hybrid species of oak tree

Quercus × morehus, Abram's oak in Kellogg's original description (later called oracle oak by Jepson), is a named hybrid between the red oaks Quercus kelloggii (California black oak) and Quercus wislizeni (interior live oak). Originally published as the unique species Quercus morehus by Kellogg rather than as the hybrid it is called today this tree is found in the US states of California and possibly southern Oregon, usually where the territories of the purported parents overlap.

Because the name Q. × morehus was adopted before 1980, while Q. wislizeni and Quercus parvula were still considered conspecific it is often applied not only to trees appearing intermediate in form between Q. kelloggii and Q. wislizeni but also to those that could be Q. kelloggii × Q. parvula. Pending formal description, the name Q. × ‘wootteni’ (Wootten's oak) has been proposed for the California black oak (Q. kelloggii) × Shreve oak (Q. parvula var. shrevei) hybrid.

Quercus × morehus is a hybrid between a deciduous oak and an evergreen oak. Leaves are generally deciduous or partially deciduous and intermediate in form between Q. kelloggii and Q. wislizeni.
