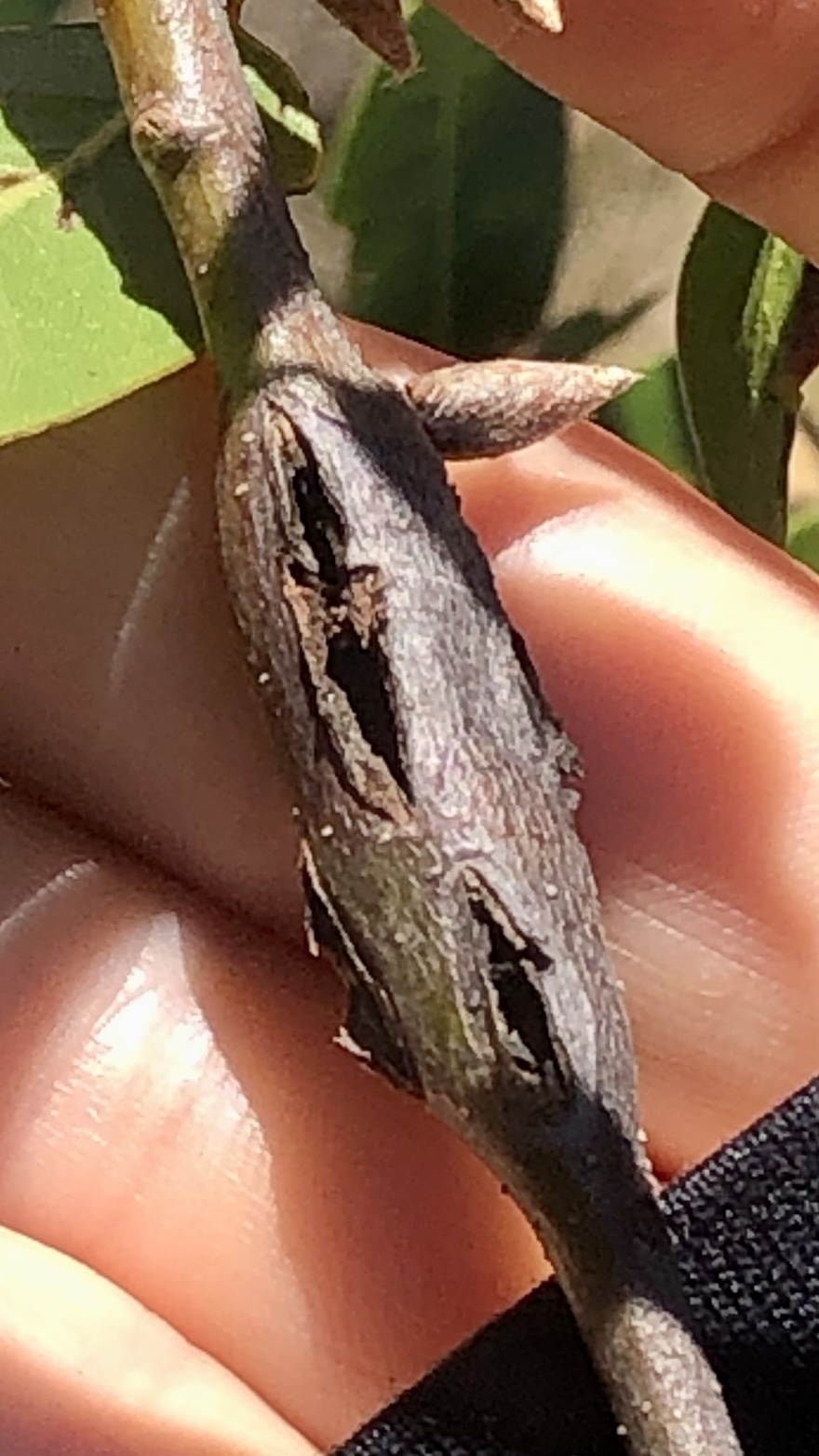
- Gall induced by Callirhytis perdens, Marin County, 2020

Scientific classification
- Kingdom: Animalia
- Phylum: Arthropoda
- Class: Insecta
- Order: Hymenoptera
- Family: Cynipidae
- Genus: Callirhytis
- Species: C. perdens

Binomial name
- Callirhytis perdens (Kinsey, 1922)

Synonyms
- Andricus perdens, Plagiotrichus perdens

= Callirhytis perdens =

North American gall-inducing wasp

Callirhytis perdens, formerly Andricus perdens, the ruptured twig gall wasp, is a species of hymenopteran that induces integral stem galls on coast live oaks, interior live oaks, and canyon live oaks in California in North America. The wasps oviposit in the stem, and over time (often after the first showers of the rainy season), the larval capsules are expelled from the lateral fissures onto the ground, where they either hatch in the leaf litter below the tree, or become fodder for grazing birds and other soil biota. This wasp is considered locally abundant.
