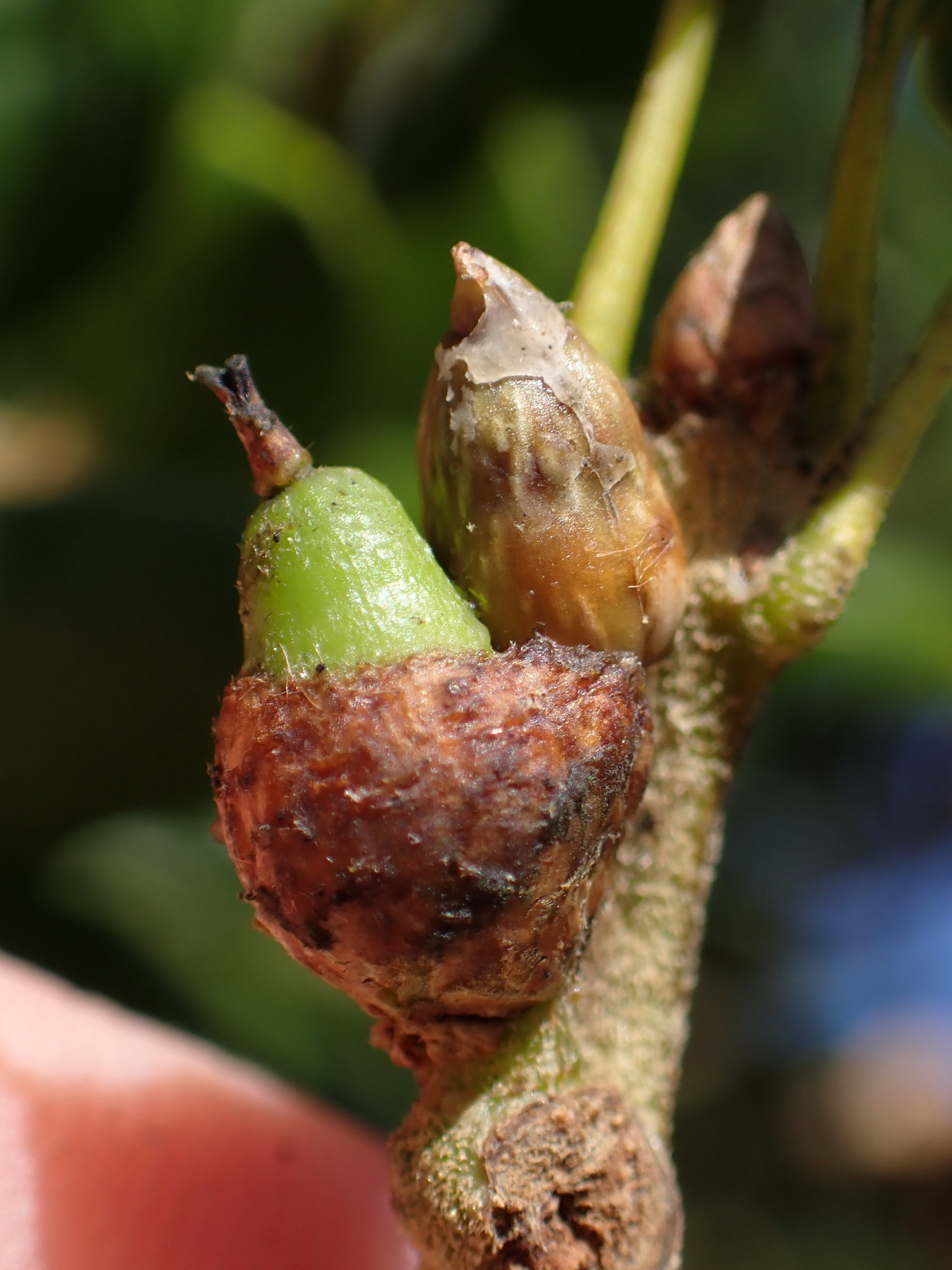
- Pacifica, California, September 2023

Scientific classification
- Kingdom: Animalia
- Phylum: Arthropoda
- Class: Insecta
- Order: Hymenoptera
- Family: Cynipidae
- Genus: Callirhytis
- Species: C. carmelensis

Binomial name
- Callirhytis carmelensis (Weld, 1922)

= Callirhytis carmelensis =

North American gall-inducing wasp

Callirhytis carmelensis, formerly Andricus carmelensis, the mottled acorn gall wasp, is a species of hymenopteran that induces galls on the acorns of coast live oaks and interior live oaks in California in North America. The purple or spotted green gall forms where the acorn attaches to the tree and often prevents normal development of the nut. The gall also produces a honeydew secretion that is attractive to other insects. This wasp is generally considered uncommon.
