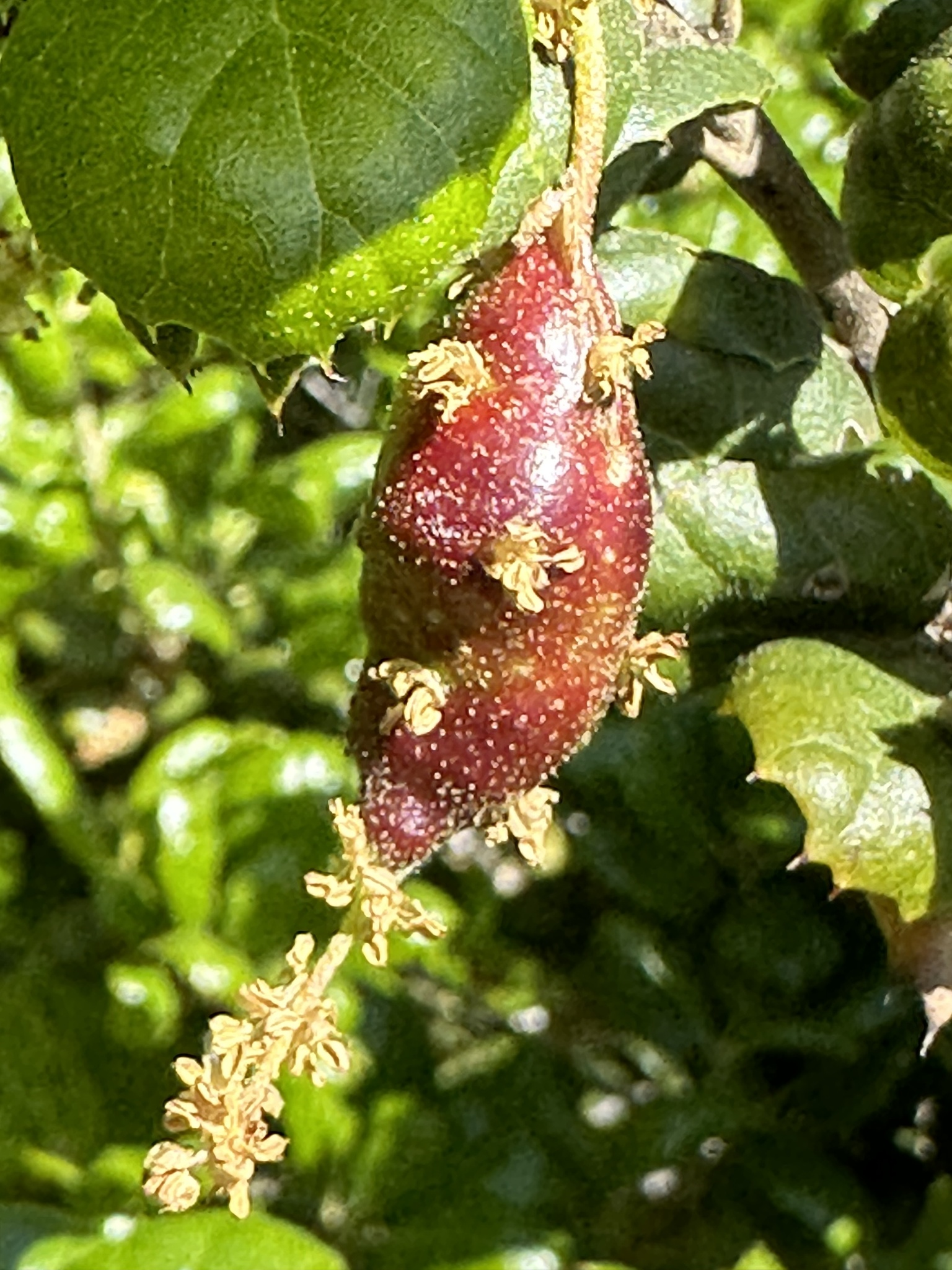
- Hollister, California, April 2023

Scientific classification
- Kingdom: Animalia
- Phylum: Arthropoda
- Class: Insecta
- Order: Hymenoptera
- Family: Cynipidae
- Genus: Callirhytis
- Species: C. congregata

Binomial name
- Callirhytis congregata (Ashmead, 1896)

Synonyms
- Andricus congregatus

= Callirhytis congregata =

North American gall-inducing wasp

Callirhytis congregata, formerly Andricus congregata, the sausage flower gall wasp, is a species of hymenopteran that induces galls on the catkins of coast live oaks, interior live oaks, and canyon live oaks in California in North America. This wasp is considered locally common. William Harris Ashmead described Andricus congregatus as producing a gall like a "rugose, yellowish brown woody swelling, containing numerous cells growing apparently from the extreme tips of very slender twigs of Quercus chrysolepis, the gall appearing to have a long peduncle".
