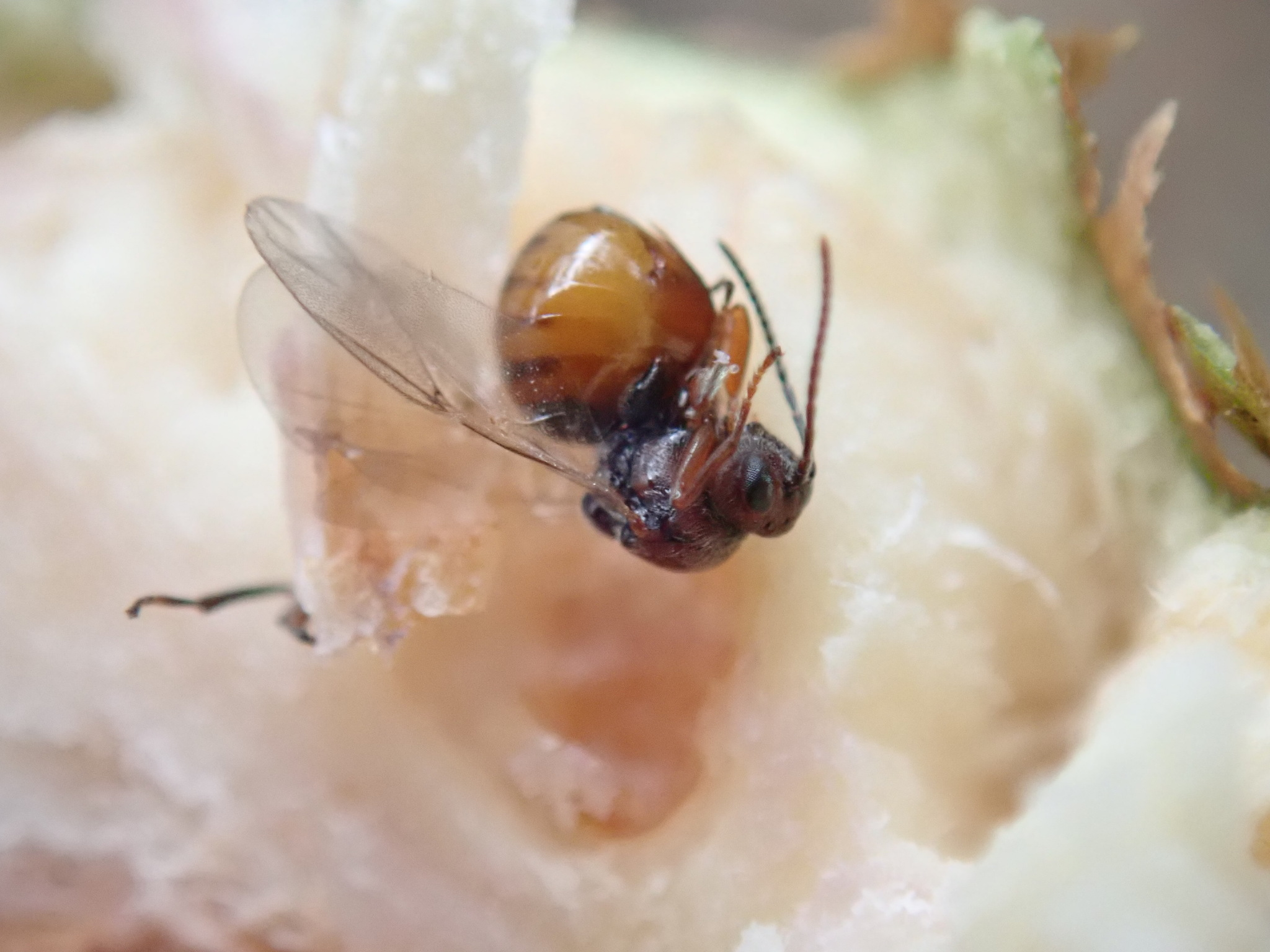

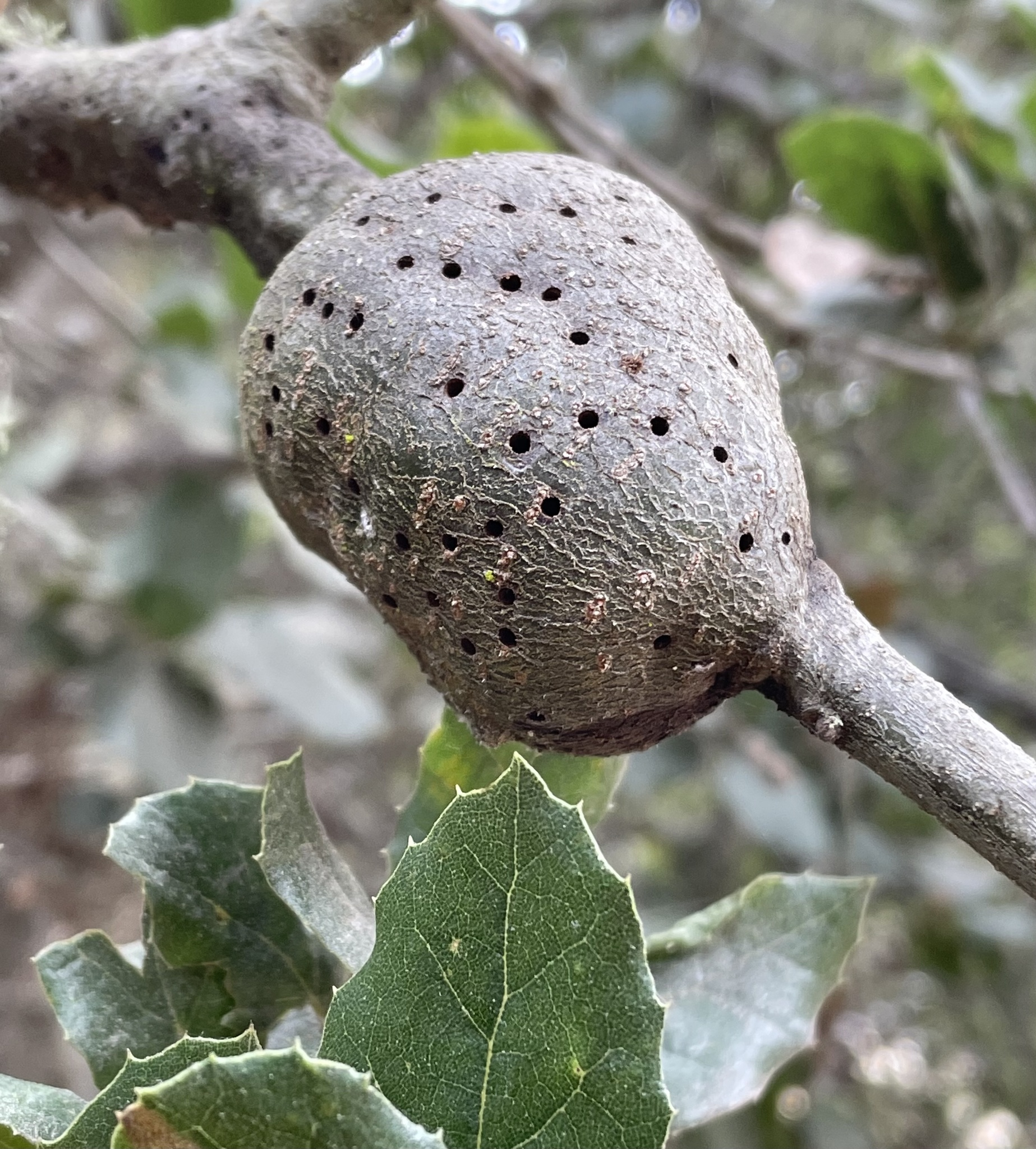
- Gouty stem gall wasp (top) and gall (bottom)

Scientific classification
- Kingdom: Animalia
- Phylum: Arthropoda
- Class: Insecta
- Order: Hymenoptera
- Family: Cynipidae
- Genus: Callirhytis
- Species: C. quercussuttoni

Binomial name
- Callirhytis quercussuttoni (Bassett, 1881)

Synonyms
- Cynips quercussuttoni Bassett, 1881

= Callirhytis quercussuttoni =

Gouty stem gall wasp

Species of wasp

Callirhytis quercussuttoni, the gouty stem gall wasp, is a species of gall wasp. Its galls appear on oaks in the red oak group (section Lobatae) (including Quercus agrifolia and Q. wisizleni) on the west coast of North America.
