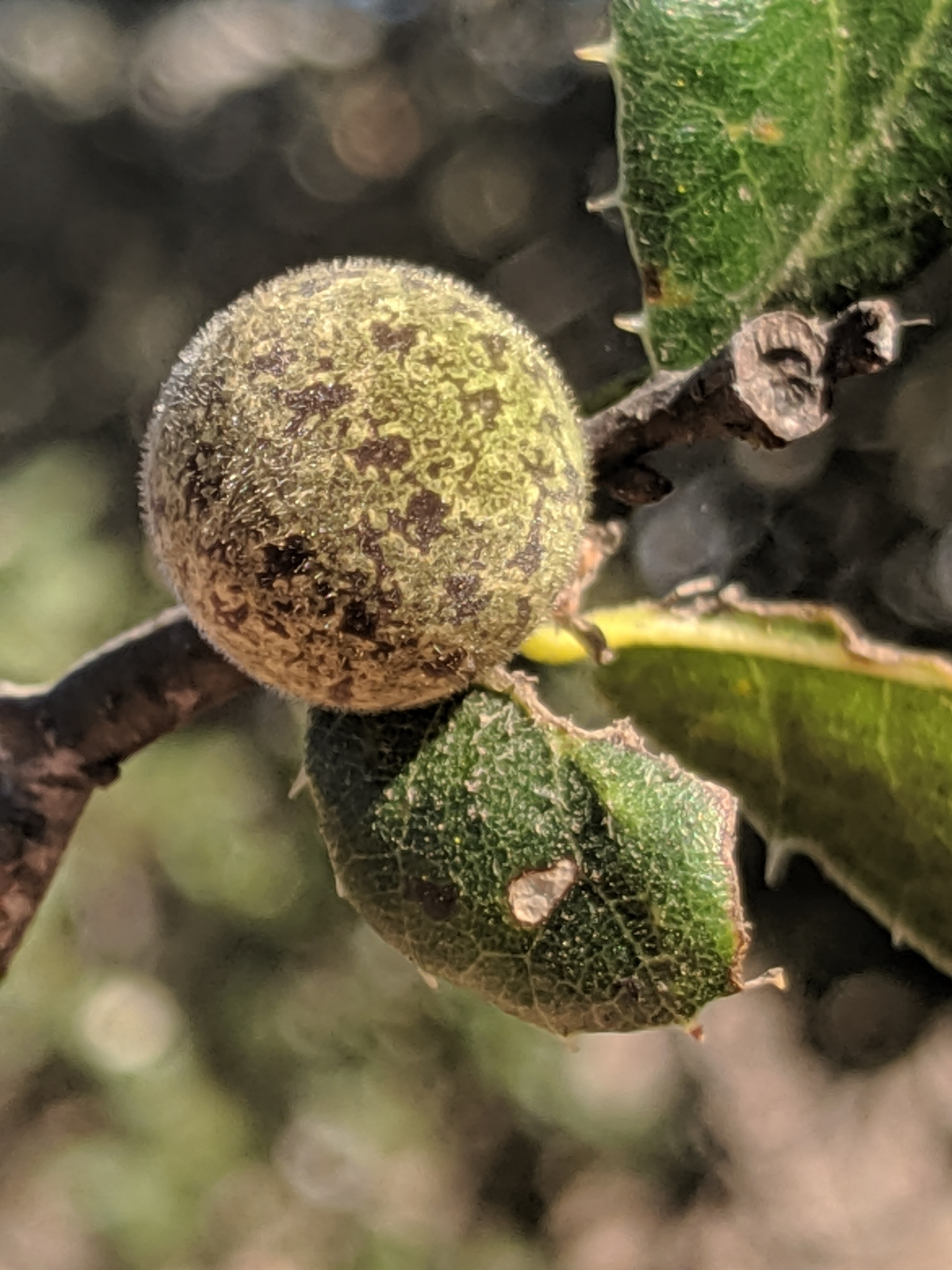
- Brown-colored round gall of the unisexual (agamic) generation

Scientific classification
- Kingdom: Animalia
- Phylum: Arthropoda
- Clade: Pancrustacea
- Class: Insecta
- Order: Hymenoptera
- Family: Cynipidae
- Genus: Callirhytis
- Species: C. quercusagrifoliae

Binomial name
- Callirhytis quercusagrifoliae (Ashmead, 1881)

= Callirhytis quercusagrifoliae =

North American gall-inducing wasp

Callirhytis quercusagrifoliae, commonly known as the bud gall wasp, is a species of cynipid wasp that induces galls on the flower buds of coast live oaks and interior live oaks. This wasp has been observed in California in North America.
