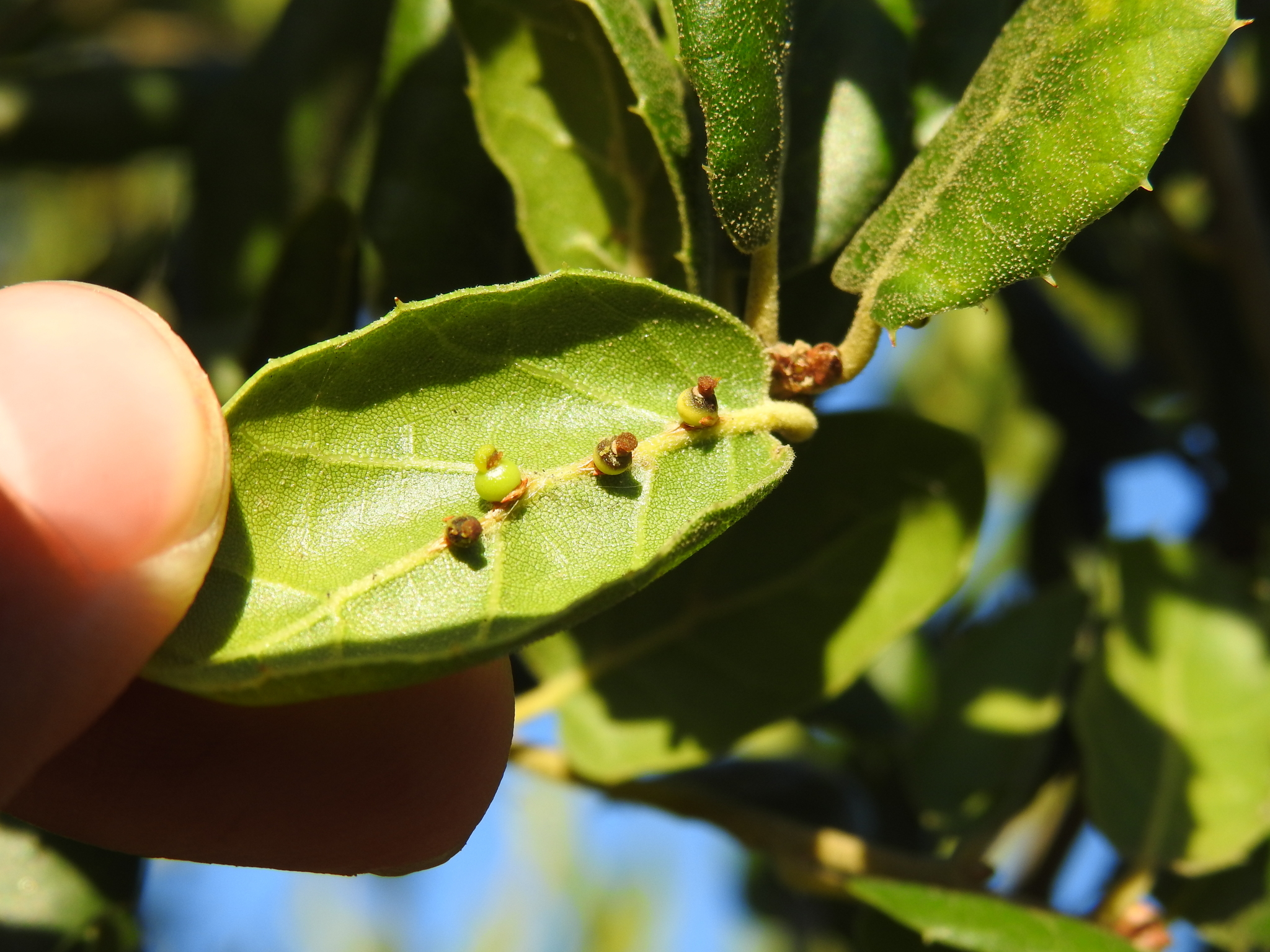
- Callirhytis serricornis in Napa County, July 2022

Scientific classification
- Kingdom: Animalia
- Phylum: Arthropoda
- Class: Insecta
- Order: Hymenoptera
- Family: Cynipidae
- Genus: Callirhytis
- Species: C. serricornis

Binomial name
- Callirhytis serricornis (Kinsey, 1922)

= Callirhytis serricornis =

North American gall-inducing wasp

Callirhytis serricornis, formerly Andricus serricornis, the kernel flower gall wasp, is a species of hymenopteran that produces galls on oak trees in California in North America. The wasp oviposits on coast live oak and interior live oak and induces a gall shaped roughly like a bottle or vase. The gall is brown in the first generation, and red and green in the second.
