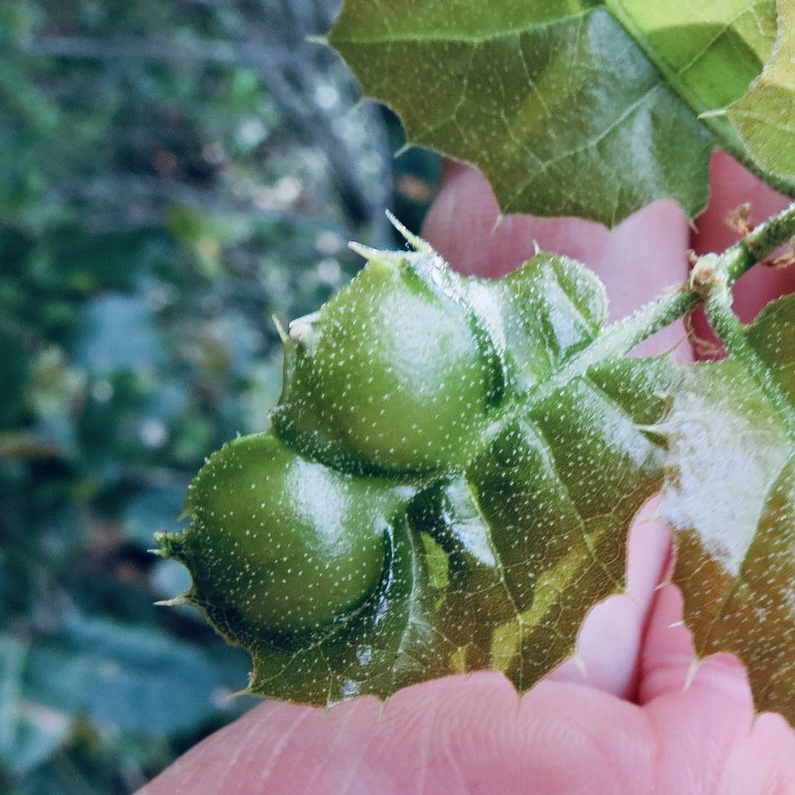
- Santa Clara County, April 2021

Scientific classification
- Kingdom: Animalia
- Phylum: Arthropoda
- Class: Insecta
- Order: Hymenoptera
- Family: Cynipidae
- Genus: Callirhytis
- Species: C. perfoveata

Binomial name
- Callirhytis perfoveata (Kinsey, 1922)

= Callirhytis perfoveata =

North American gall-inducing wasp

Callirhytis perfoveata, formerly Andricus perfoveata, the leaf ball gall wasp, is a species of hymenopteran that produces leaf galls on oak trees in California in North America. The wasp oviposits on coast live oak, interior live oak, and occasionally on California black oak, and induces what appears to be a roughly spherical gall embedded within the leaf. The gall is initially bright green and turns brown as it ages.
