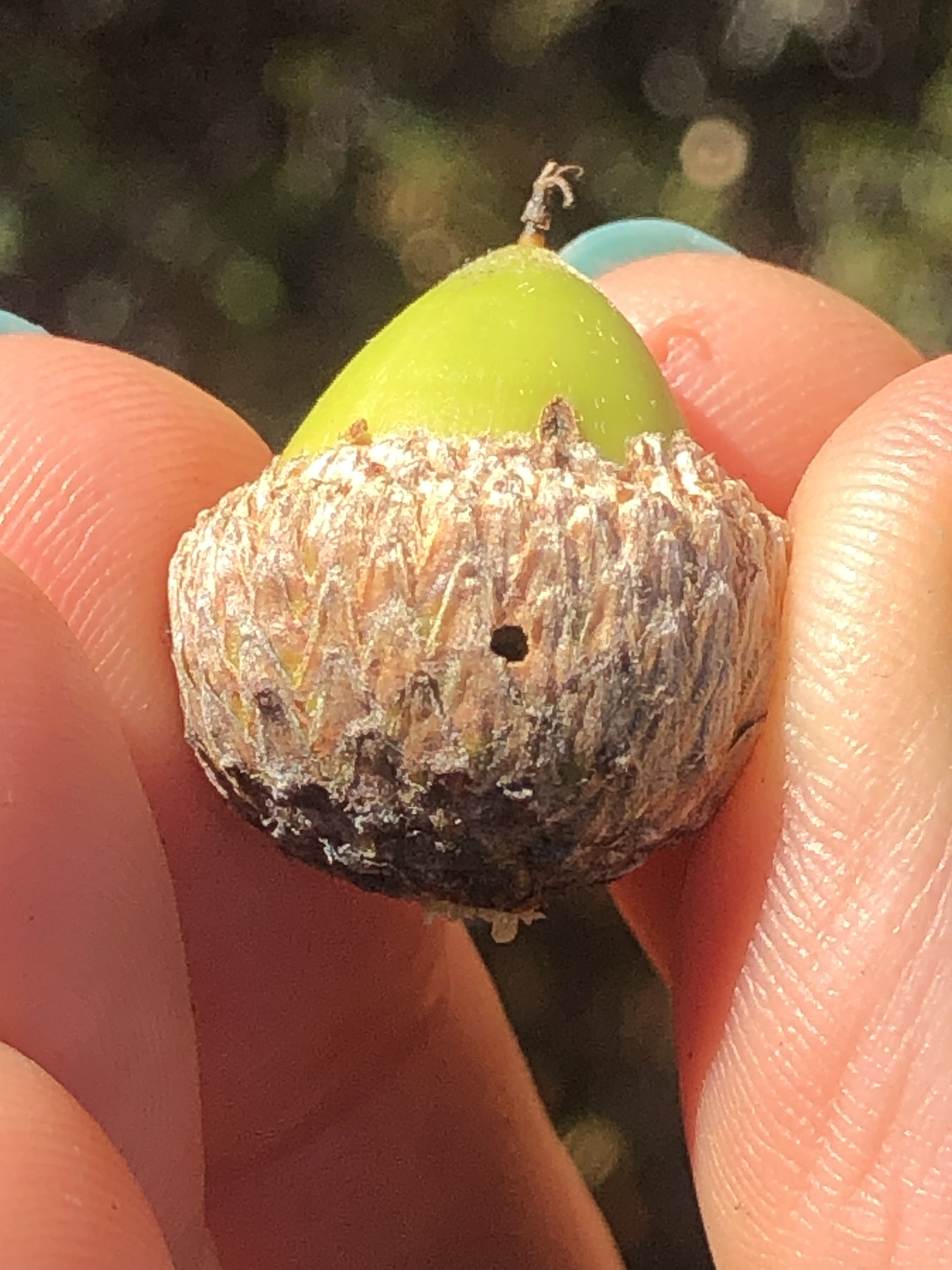
- Exit hole on Callirhytis eldoradensis galled acorn, Marin County, 2023

Scientific classification
- Kingdom: Animalia
- Phylum: Arthropoda
- Class: Insecta
- Order: Hymenoptera
- Family: Cynipidae
- Genus: Callirhytis
- Species: C. eldoradensis

Binomial name
- Callirhytis eldoradensis (Beutenmuller, 1913)

Synonyms
- Andricus eldoradensis, Biorhiza eldoradensis, Eumayria eldoradensis

= Callirhytis eldoradensis =

North American gall-inducing wasp

Callirhytis eldoradensis, formerly Andricus eldoradensis, the acorn gall wasp, is a species of hymenopteran that induces galls on the acorns of coast live oaks, interior live oaks, and canyon live oaks in California in North America. This gall is not as readily visible as some of the showier oak galls, but exit holes may be visible on the acorns, and galled acorns are likely to stay on the tree after other acorns have dropped. The unisexual generation of this wasp produces a modest bud gall.
