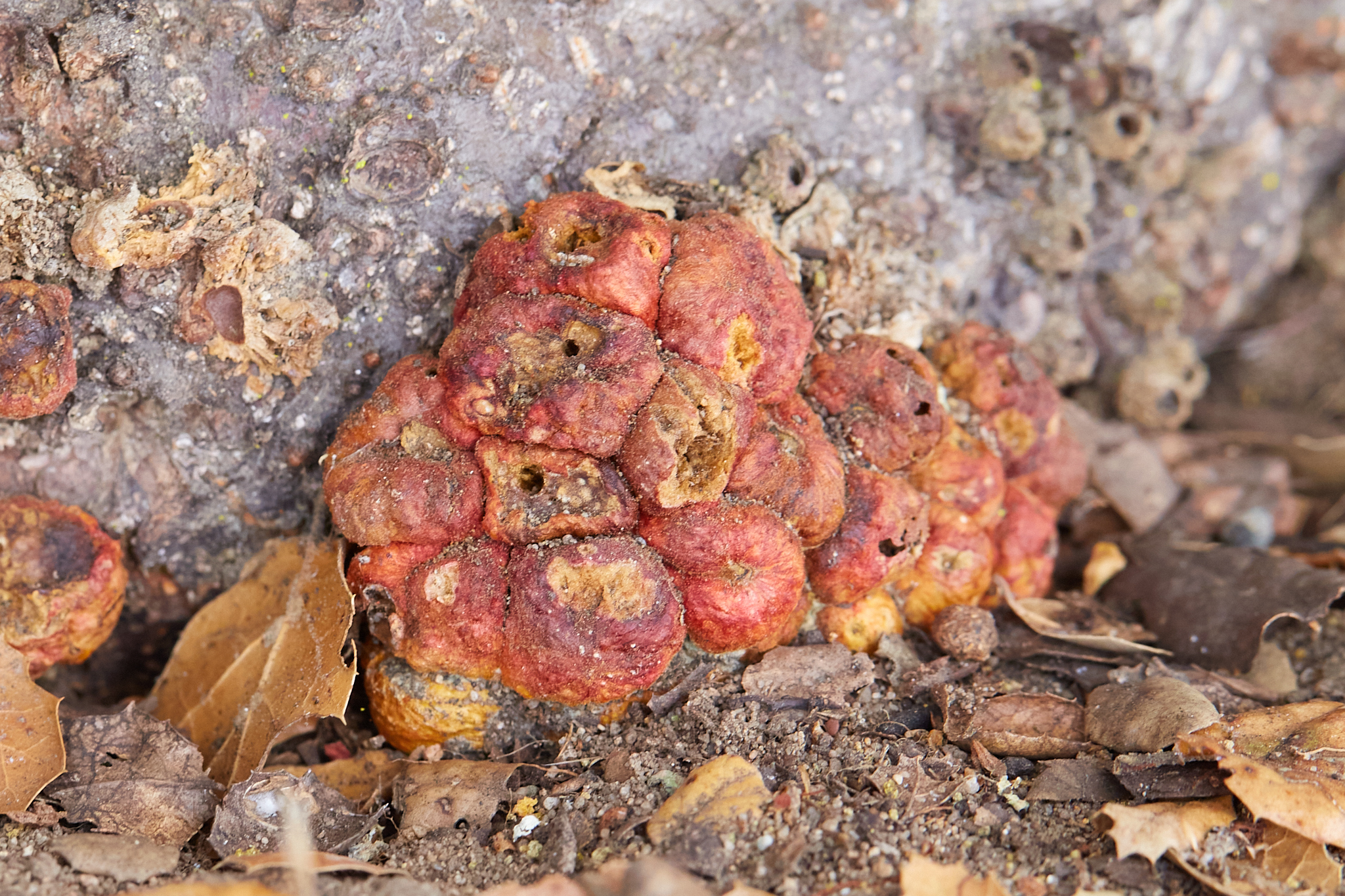
- Fort Ord Natural Reserve, September 2021

Scientific classification
- Kingdom: Animalia
- Phylum: Arthropoda
- Class: Insecta
- Order: Hymenoptera
- Family: Cynipidae
- Genus: Callirhytis
- Species: C. apicalis

Binomial name
- Callirhytis apicalis (Ashmead, 1896)

= Callirhytis apicalis =

Species of insects

Callirhytis apicalis, formerly Andricus apicalis, the trunk gall wasp, is a species of hymenopteran that induces galls on the trunks or roots of black oak group trees in California in North America. Newly formed galls are red or yellow, turning brown as they age. This wasp is most often associated with Quercus agrifolia (coast live oak). This wasp is generally considered uncommon.
