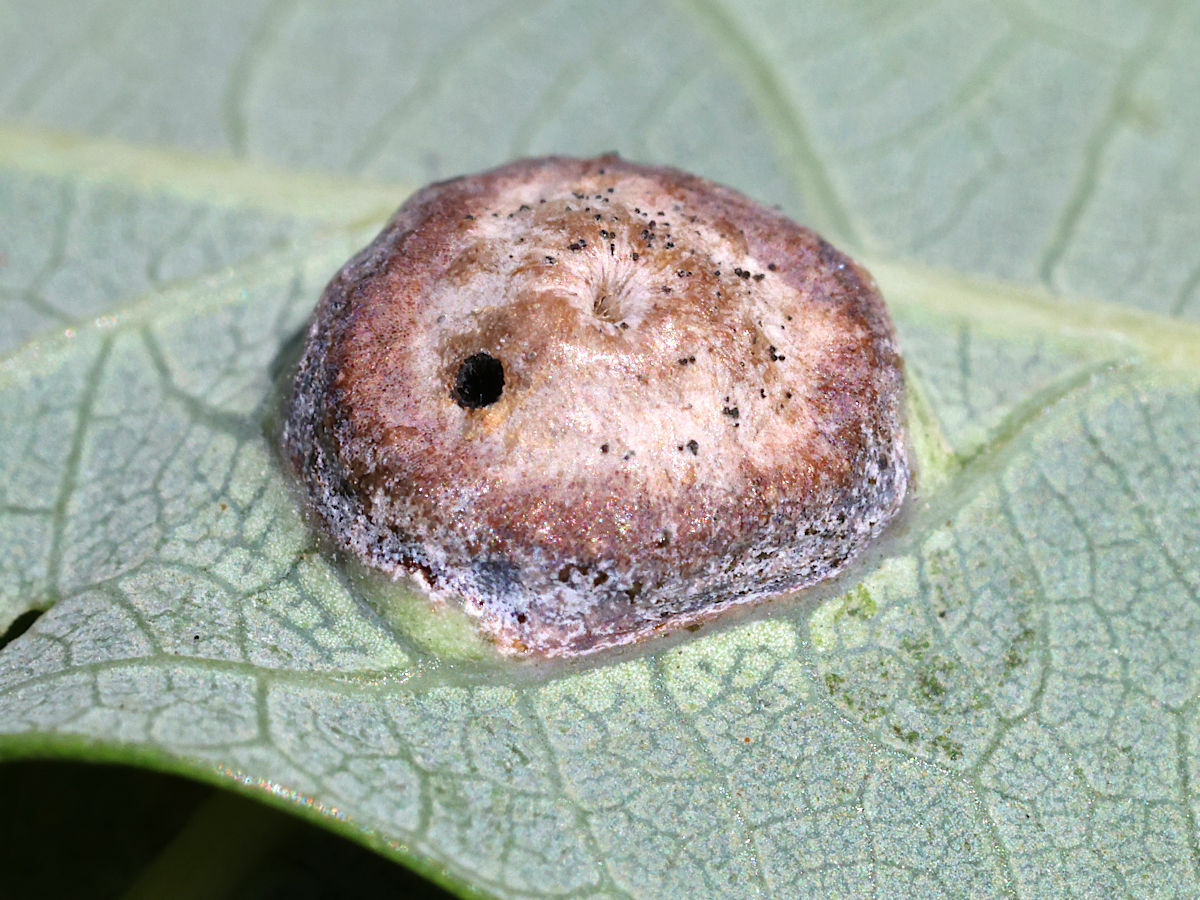
- Sexgen gall, external
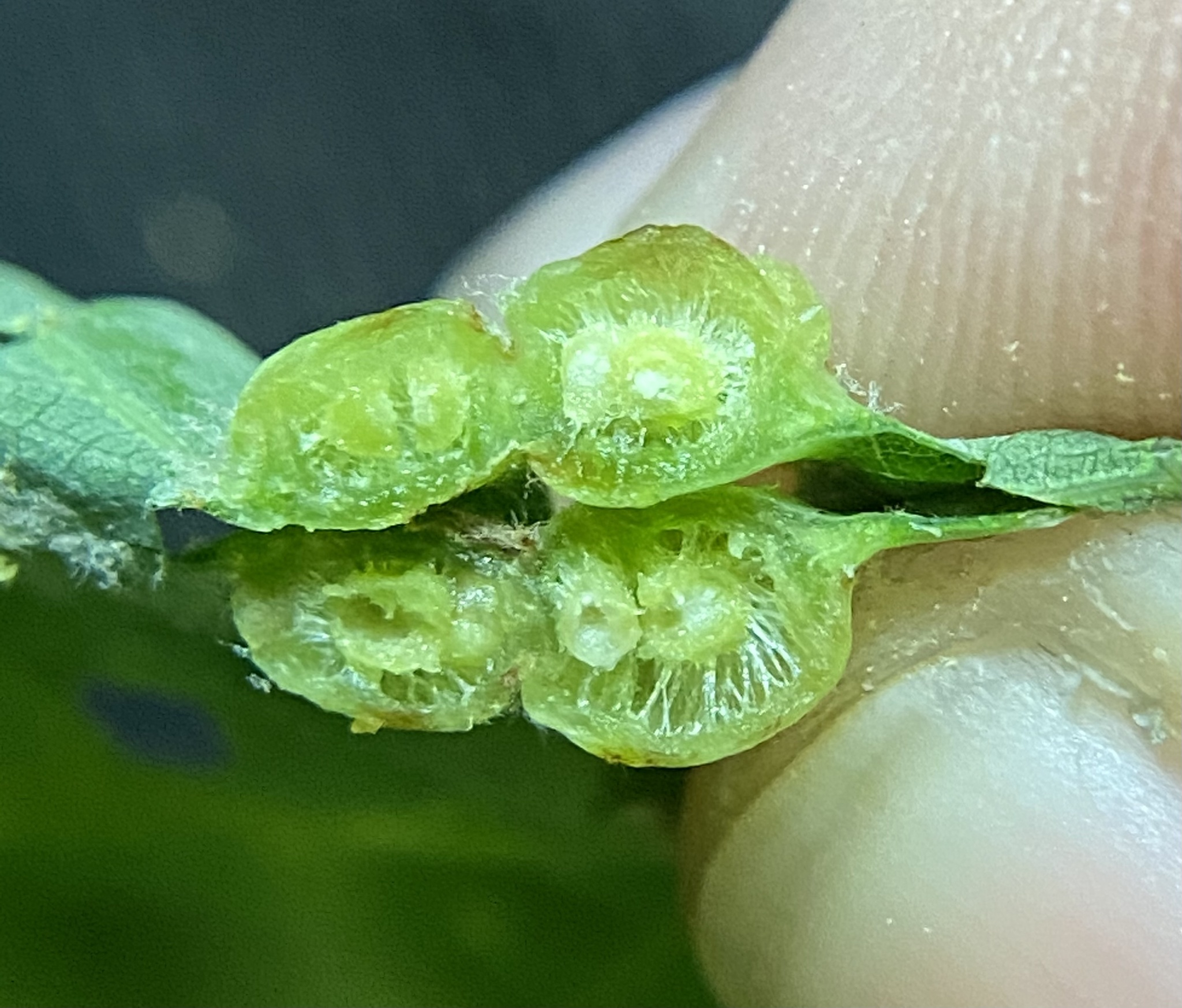
- Sexgen galls, internal

Scientific classification
- Kingdom: Animalia
- Phylum: Arthropoda
- Clade: Pancrustacea
- Class: Insecta
- Order: Hymenoptera
- Family: Cynipidae
- Genus: Callirhytis
- Species: C. quercusfutilis

Binomial name
- Callirhytis quercusfutilis (Osten-Sacken, 1861)

Synonyms
- Callirhytis radicis Bassett, 1889; Andricus radicis (Bassett, 1889); Andricus radicicola Dalla Torre, 1893; Callirhytis radicicola (Dalla Torre, 1893)

= Callirhytis quercusfutilis =

Species of wasp

Callirhytis quercusfutilis, the oak wart gall wasp, is a species of gall wasp in the family Cynipidae.

== Ecology ==
Range is central and eastern North America.

The agamic generation lives in the scurfy bark of a host white oak tree root or trunk base. Host species include white oak, swamp white oak, overcup oak, bur oak, swamp chestnut oak, chestnut oak, dwarf chinkapin oak, and post oak.

The sexual generation induces galls on host white oak leaves, between leaf veins and projecting slightly above both surfaces of the leaf. Internally, thin radiating fibers connect the larval chamber to the wall of the gall, providing the larva with nutrients supplied by the host.
