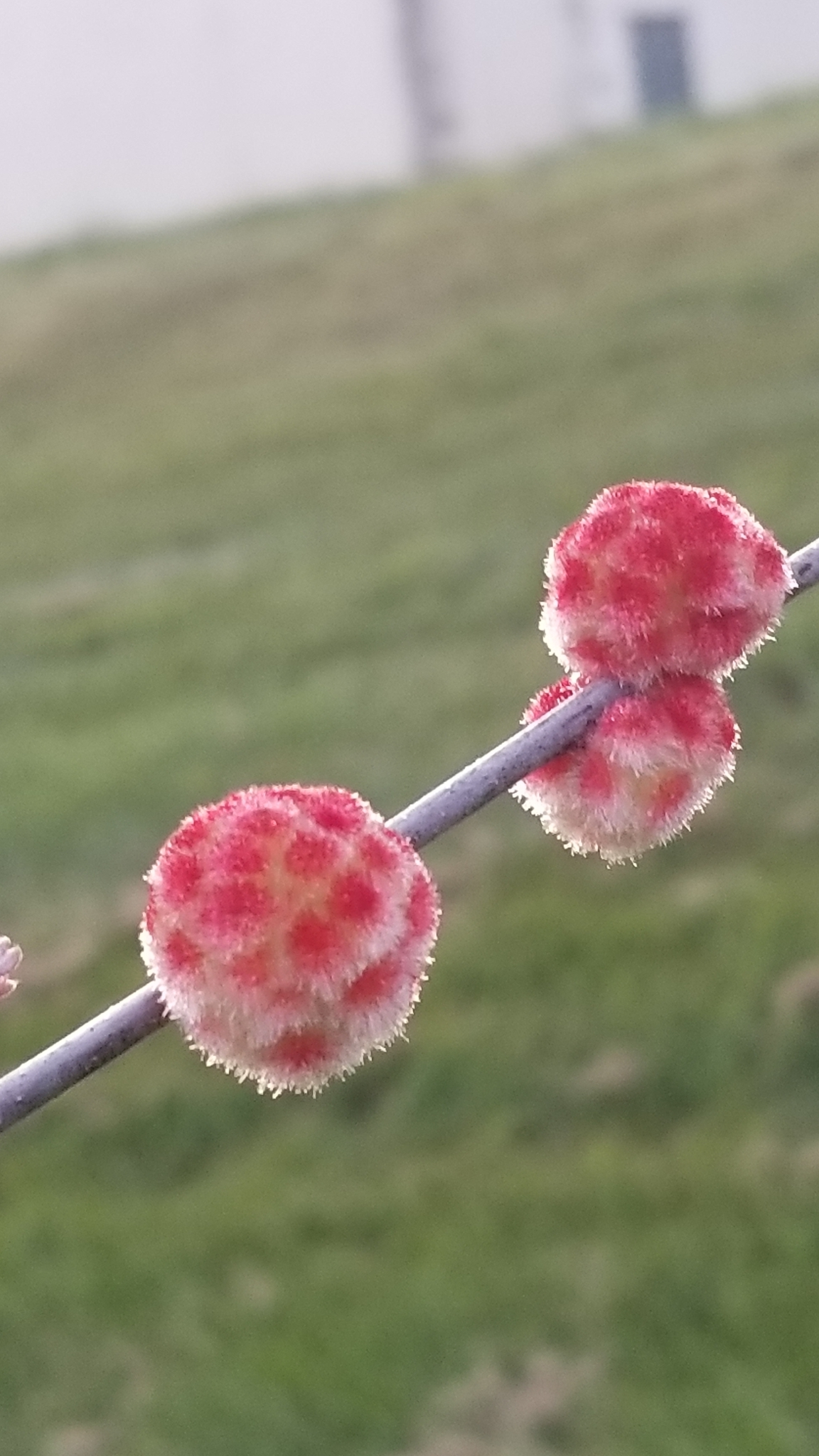
- Callirhytis seminator gall, Virginia, 2021

Scientific classification
- Kingdom: Animalia
- Phylum: Arthropoda
- Class: Insecta
- Order: Hymenoptera
- Family: Cynipidae
- Genus: Callirhytis
- Species: C. seminator

Binomial name
- Callirhytis seminator (Harris, 1841)

= Callirhytis seminator =

Species of wasp

Callirhytis seminator, the wool sower, is a species of gall wasp in the family Cynipidae.

The adult wasps are about 1/8" in length and dark brown in color. The larvae are white and fat and have no legs. The wasps only lay eggs on white oak trees and only in the spring. They lay the egg in a gall, a round, white structure resembling a cotton ball. It starts out white and later changes color. The larvae develop inside the gall. If pulled open, the gall will appear to have seedlike structures inside it. These structures are actually hard plant material.

Gall wasps have a two-generation alternating cycle: One generation produces stem galls, and the wasps that emerge from that stem gall mature and lay their own eggs in leaf galls. The wasps that emerge from the leaf gall mature and produce stem galls. Scientists do not know what the alternate wool sower wasp gall looks like.

The wasps neither sting humans nor occur in such numbers as to damage the white oak trees.
