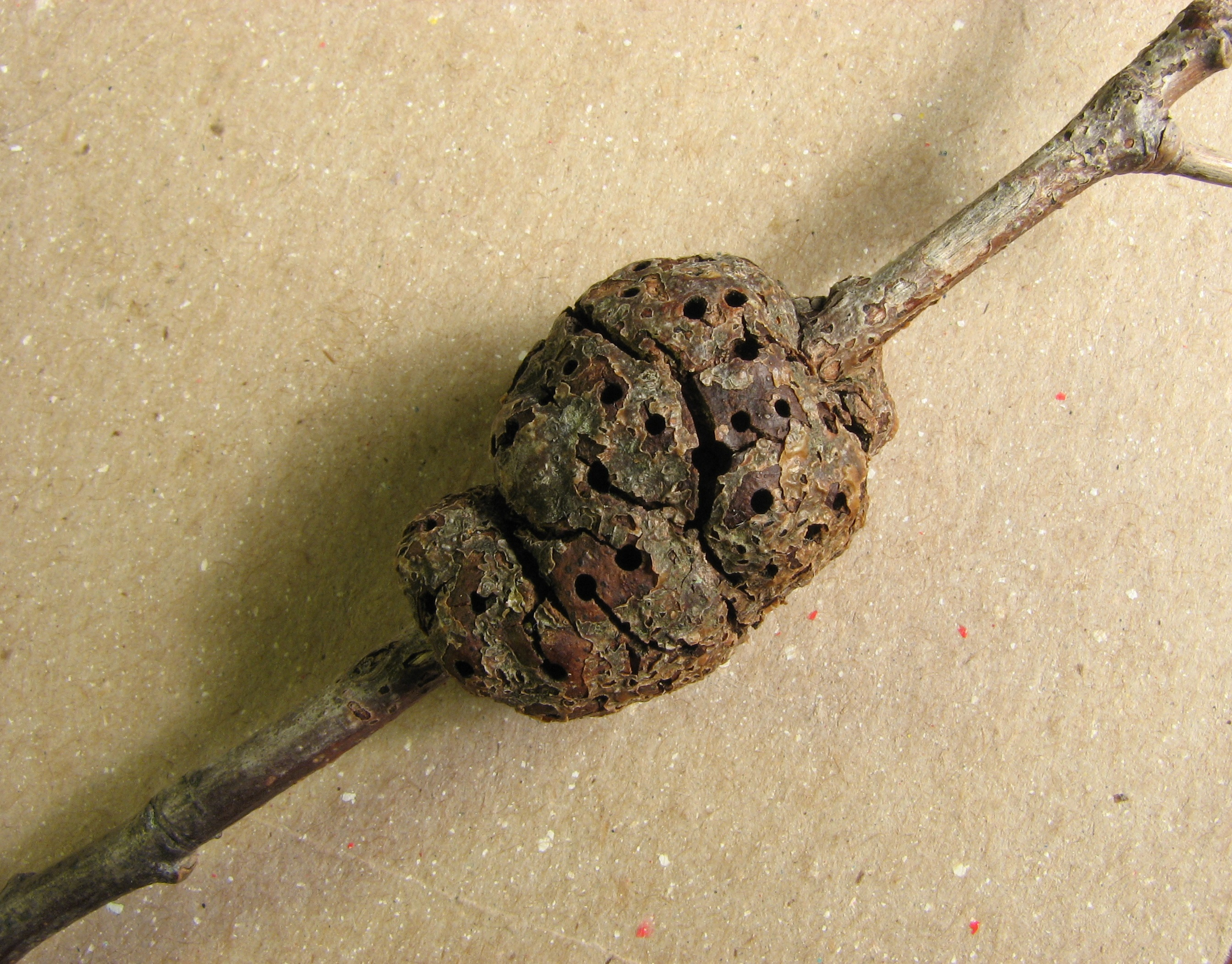
- Callirhytis quercuspunctata gall

Scientific classification
- Kingdom: Animalia
- Phylum: Arthropoda
- Class: Insecta
- Order: Hymenoptera
- Family: Cynipidae
- Tribe: Cynipini
- Genus: Callirhytis; Förster, 1869

= Callirhytis =

Genus of wasps

Callirhytis is a genus of gall wasps in the family Cynipidae. There are more than 90 described species in Callirhytis. Wasps in this genus primarily induce galls on oak trees in North America.

== Species ==
The following species are recognised in the genus Callirhytis:

- Callirhytis afion Melika et al., 2020
- Callirhytis apicalis (Ashmead, 1896)
- Callirhytis aquaticae (Ashmead, 1887)
- Callirhytis attigua Weld, 1959
- Callirhytis balanacea Weld, 1928
- Callirhytis balanaspis Weld, 1922
- Callirhytis balanoides Weld, 1922
- Callirhytis balanopsis Weld, 1922
- Callirhytis balanosa Weld, 1922
- Callirhytis bipapillata Weld, 1959
- Callirhytis blastophaga (Ashmead, 1887)
- Callirhytis cameroni Medianero & Nieves-Aldrey, 2014
- Callirhytis carmelensis Weld, 1922
- Callirhytis cedros Dailey & Sprenger, 1977
- Callirhytis cedrosensis Dailey & Sprenger, 1977
- Callirhytis cistella Weld, 1952
- Callirhytis clarkei (Bassett, 1890)
- Callirhytis clavula (Osten Sacken, 1861) - White oak club gall wasp
- Callirhytis confusa (Ashmead, 1881)
- Callirhytis congregata (Ashmead, 1896) - Sausage flower gall wasp
- Callirhytis cressoni (Beutenmuller, 1913)
- Callirhytis crypta (Ashmead, 1887)
- Callirhytis eldoradensis (Beutenmuller 1913)
- Callirhytis electrea Weld, 1944
- Callirhytis ellipsoida Weld, 1921
- Callirhytis elliptica Weld, 1921
- Callirhytis elongata (Kinsey, 1922)
- Callirhytis erythrocephala (Giraud, 1859)
- Callirhytis excavata (Ashmead, 1896)
- Callirhytis exigua (Bassett, 1900)
- Callirhytis favosa (Bassett, 1890) - Honeycomb leaf gall wasp
- Callirhytis flavipes (Gillette, 1890)
- Callirhytis florensis Weld, 1944
- Callirhytis floridana (Ashmead, 1887)
- Callirhytis floripara Weld, 1959
- Callirhytis frequens (Gillette, 1890)
- Callirhytis fulva Weld, 1921
- Callirhytis furva Weld, 1952
- Callirhytis gallaestriatae Weld, 1927
- Callirhytis gemmiformis (Beutenmüller, 1917)
- Callirhytis glandium (Giraud, 1859)
- Callirhytis glandulus (Beutenmüller, 1913)
- Callirhytis glomerosa Weld, 1957
- Callirhytis hartigi Forster, 1869
- Callirhytis hopkinsi Weld, 1952
- Callirhytis infuscata (Ashmead, 1887)
- Callirhytis intersita Weld, 1957
- Callirhytis juvenca Weld, 1944
- Callirhytis lanata (Gillette, 1891)
- Callirhytis lapillula Weld, 1922
- Callirhytis lentiformis Lyon, 1984
- Callirhytis marginata Weld, 1921
- Callirhytis medularis Weld, 1959
- Callirhytis meunieri Kieffer, 1902
- Callirhytis middletoni Weld, 1959
- Callirhytis myrtifoliae (Beutenmüller, 1917)
- Callirhytis nigrae (Ashmead, 1861)
- Callirhytis ovata Weld, 1921
- Callirhytis parva Weld, 1922
- Callirhytis pedunculata (Bassett, 1890)
- Callirhytis perdens (Kinsey, 1922) - Ruptured twig gall wasp
- Callirhytis perditor (Bassett, 1900)
- Callirhytis perfoveata (Kinsey, 1922) - Ball gall wasp
- Callirhytis perobscura Weld, 1957
- Callirhytis perrugosa Weld, 1944
- Callirhytis petrina Weld, 1922
- Callirhytis pigra (Bassett, 1881)
- Callirhytis piperoides (Bassett, 1900)
- Callirhytis protobalanus Dailey & Sprenger, 1977
- Callirhytis pulchra (Bassett, 1890) - Oak flower gall wasp
- Callirhytis quercifoliae (Ashmead, 1885)
- Callirhytis quercusagrifoliae (Ashmead, 1881) - Live oak bud gall wasp
- Callirhytis quercusbatatoides (Ashmead, 1881) - Southern live oak stem gall wasp
- Callirhytis quercusclavigera (Ashmead, 1881)
- Callirhytis quercuscornigera (Osten Sacken, 1865)
- Callirhytis quercusfutilis (Osten Sacken, 1861)
- Callirhytis quercusgemmaria (Ashmead, 1885)
- Callirhytis quercusoperator (Osten Sacken, 1862) - Woolly catkin gall wasp
- Callirhytis quercuspunctata (Bassett, 1863) - Gouty oak gall wasp
- Callirhytis quercussuttoni (Ashmead, 1885) - Gouty stem gall wasp
- Callirhytis quercusventricosa Bassett, 1864
- Callirhytis quinqueseptum (Ashmead, 1885)
- Callirhytis rubida Weld, 1921
- Callirhytis rufescens (Mayr, 1882)
- Callirhytis rugulosa (Beutenmüller, 1911)
- Callirhytis scitula (Bassett, 1864)
- Callirhytis seminator Harris, 1841 - Wool sower
- Callirhytis seminosa (Bassett, 1890)
- Callirhytis serricornis (Weld, 1952) - Kernel flower gall wasp
- Callirhytis subcostata Weld, 1952
- Callirhytis tobiiro Ashmead, 1904
- Callirhytis tubicola (Osten Sacken, 1861)
- Callirhytis turnerii (Ashmead, 1887)
