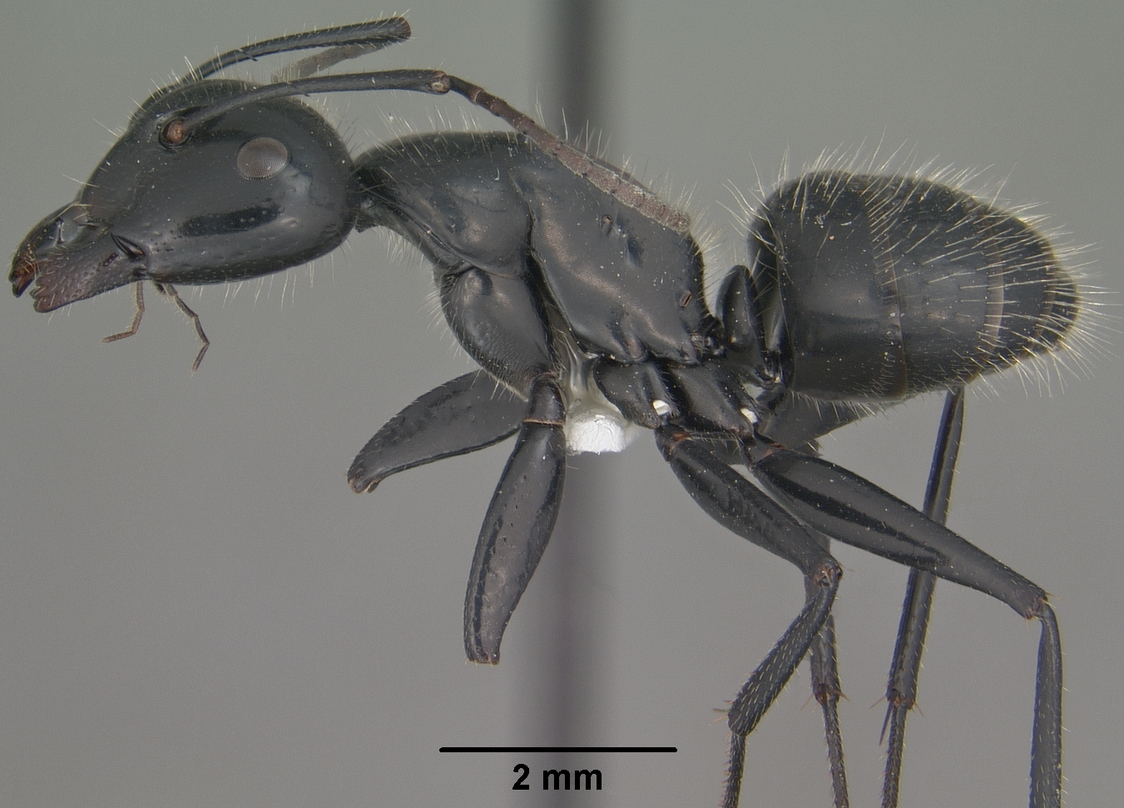

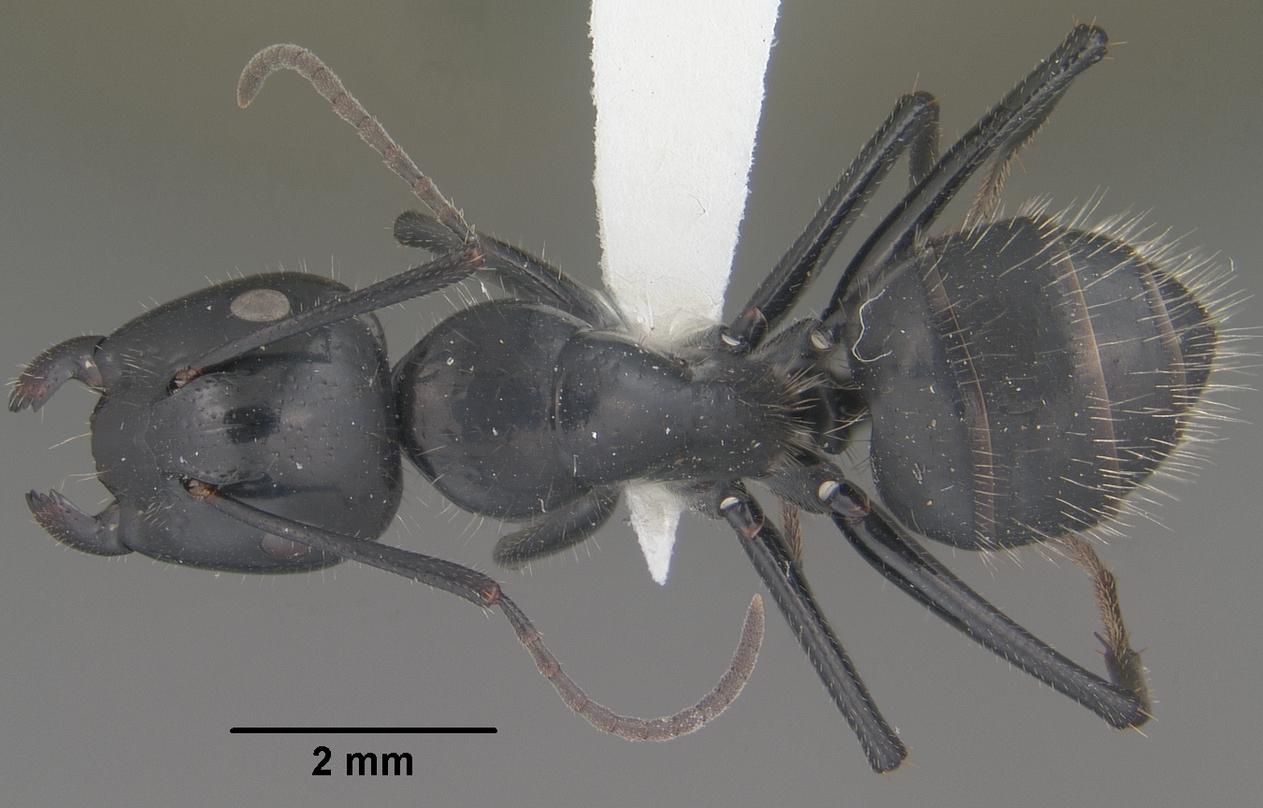
- Worker in profile (top) and dorsal view (bottom)

Scientific classification
- Domain: Eukaryota
- Kingdom: Animalia
- Phylum: Arthropoda
- Class: Insecta
- Order: Hymenoptera
- Family: Formicidae
- Subfamily: Formicinae
- Genus: Camponotus
- Subgenus: Camponotus
- Species: C. laevissimus

Binomial name
- Camponotus laevissimus Mackay, 2019

Synonyms
- Formica laevigata Smith, F. 1858; Camponotus laevigatus (Smith, 1858)

= Camponotus laevissimus =

Species of ant

Camponotus laevissimus (formerly C. laevigatus), the giant carpenter ant, is a species of carpenter ant native to western Canada, the United States, and Mexico. Workers measure between 7 and 13 millimetres (0.28 and 0.51 in) in length. It is generally shiny black with a blue tint, and the body is covered in short white hairs. The species, which is primarily diurnal, tends to make its nests by hollowing out redwoods. It feeds on the pupae of the western spruce budworm.
