= Euderces velutinus =

Scientific classification
- Kingdom: Animalia
- Phylum: Arthropoda
- Clade: Pancrustacea
- Class: Insecta
- Order: Coleoptera
- Suborder: Polyphaga
- Infraorder: Cucujiformia
- Family: Cerambycidae
- Genus: Euderces
- Species: E. velutinus

Binomial name
- Euderces velutinus (Fisher, 1931)

Synonyms
- Eplophorus velutinus

Species of beetle

Euderces velutinus is a long-horned beetle native to Central America. It is a good ant mimic of the conspicuous species Camponotus sericeiventris.

== Description ==
E. velutinus is about 1 cm long and 3 mm wide. The general color is black, with short golden hairs on top, patterned in a ways such that it resembles an ant. The hind legs are shaped ant-like. The beetle's head and prothorax together mimic the ant's head, with a pair of black spots simulating the eyes.

It is very similar to E. magnus, but is smaller, has a shorter pronotum, and has the entire apical half of the elytra densely clothed with silky, golden yellow pubescence, which helps giving the impression of C. sericeiventris.

== Distribution ==
E. velutinus has been found in Guatemala and Honduras.

== See also ==
- Myrmecotypus — a spider genus with one species also mimicking C. sericeiventris
