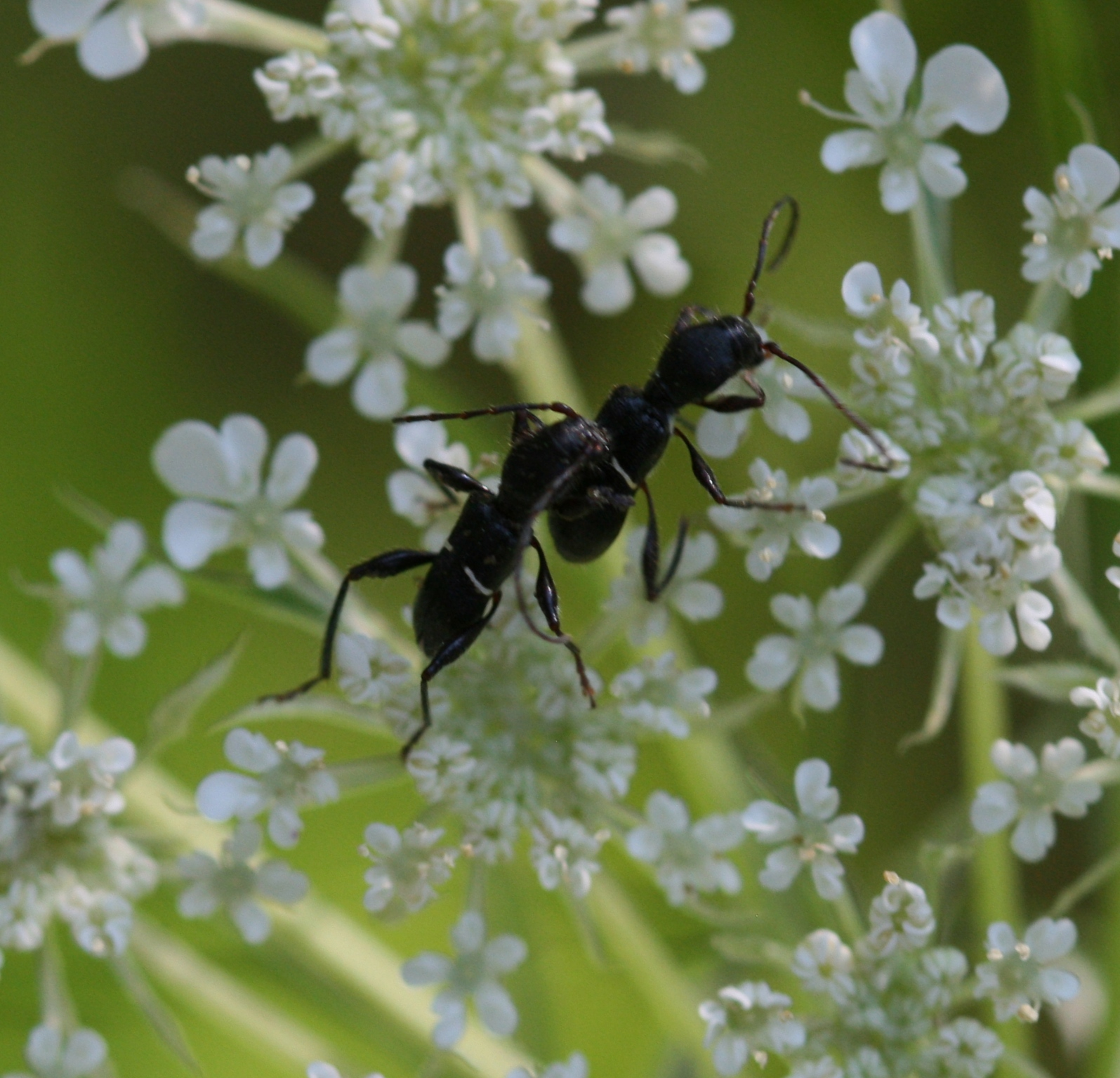
- Euderces picipes

Scientific classification
- Kingdom: Animalia
- Phylum: Arthropoda
- Class: Insecta
- Order: Coleoptera
- Suborder: Polyphaga
- Infraorder: Cucujiformia
- Family: Cerambycidae
- Tribe: Tillomorphini
- Genus: Euderces; LeConte, 1850

Species
- See text

Diversity
- c. 60 species

Synonyms
- Apelocera Chevrolat, 1862; Apilocera Chevrolat, 1862; Cleozona Bates, 1874; Eplophorus Chevrolat, 1861

= Euderces =

Genus of beetles

Euderces is a genus of longhorn beetles, family Cerambycidae. They are found in South, Central, and North America, with the centre of diversity in southern Mexico and Guatemala.

Many members of this New World genus are ant mimics. E. velutinus is a tropical species closely resembling the common ant species Camponotus sericeiventris. Most species are smaller than 5 mm.

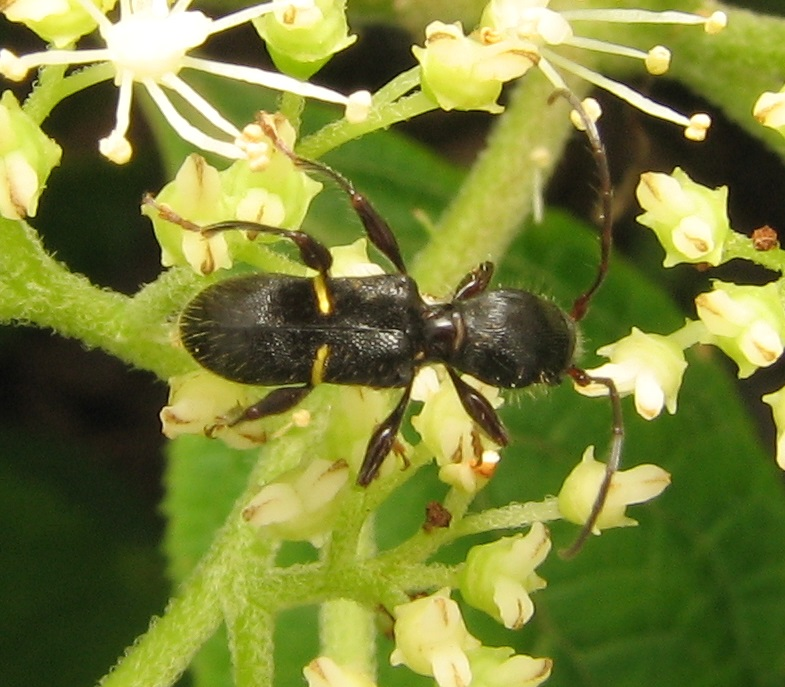
E. picipes on wild hydrangea

== Distribution ==
Four species of this genus occur in the United States.

== Species ==
- Euderces acutipennis Bates, 1885
- Euderces andersoni Giesbert & Chemsak, 1997
- Euderces aspericollis (Chemsak, 1969)
- Euderces auricaudus Giesbert & Chemsak, 1997
- Euderces azureus Giesbert & Chemsak, 1997
- Euderces basimaculatus Giesbert & Chemsak, 1997
- Euderces batesi Giesbert & Chemsak, 1997
- Euderces bellus Giesbert & Chemsak, 1997
- Euderces bicinctus (Linsley, 1935)
- Euderces biplagiatus Giesbert & Chemsak, 1997
- Euderces boucardi (Chevrolat, 1862)
- Euderces brailovskyi Giesbert & Chemsak, 1997
- Euderces cleriformis (Bates, 1885)
- Euderces cribellatus (Bates, 1885)
- Euderces cribripennis Bates, 1892
- Euderces dilutus Martins, 1975
- Euderces dimidiatipennis (Melzer, 1932)
- Euderces disparicrus Giesbert & Chemsak, 1997
- Euderces elvirae Giesbert & Chemsak, 1997
- Euderces grossistriatus Giesbert & Chemsak, 1997
- Euderces guatemalenus Giesbert & Chemsak, 1997
- Euderces guerinii (Chevrolat, 1862)
- Euderces hoegei (Bates, 1885)
- Euderces howdeni Chemsak, 1969
- Euderces laevicauda Bates, 1885
- Euderces linsleyi Giesbert & Chemsak, 1997
- Euderces longicollis (Linsley, 1935)
- Euderces magnus (Bates, 1885)
- Euderces nelsoni Chemsak, 1969
- Euderces noguerai Giesbert & Chemsak, 1997
- Euderces obliquefasciatus Giesbert & Chemsak, 1997
- Euderces parallelus LeConte, 1873
- Euderces paraposticus Giesbert & Chemsak, 1997
- Euderces perplexus Giesbert & Chemsak, 1997
- Euderces picipes (Fabricius, 1787)
- Euderces pini (Olivier, 1795)
- Euderces posticus (Pascoe, 1866)
- Euderces postipallidus Giesbert & Chemsak, 1997
- Euderces propinquus Giesbert & Chemsak, 1997
- Euderces proximus Giesbert & Chemsak, 1997
- Euderces pulcher (Bates, 1874)
- Euderces pusillus Giesbert & Chemsak, 1997
- Euderces reichei LeConte, 1873
- Euderces reticulatus (Bates, 1885)
- Euderces rubellus (Bates, 1885)
- Euderces sculpticollis (Bates, 1885)
- Euderces spinicornis (Chevrolat, 1835)
- Euderces succinus Giesbert & Chemsak, 1997
- Euderces tibialis Giesbert & Chemsak, 1997
- Euderces turnbowi Giesbert & Chemsak, 1997
- Euderces velutinus (Fisher, 1931)
- Euderces venezuelensis Giesbert & Chemsak, 1997
- Euderces waltli (Chevrolat, 1862)
- Euderces wappesi Giesbert & Chemsak, 1997
- Euderces westcotti Hovore, 1988
- Euderces yucatecus (Bates, 1892)
