= Myrmecotypus =

- M. rettenmeyeri

Scientific classification
- Domain: Eukaryota
- Kingdom: Animalia
- Phylum: Arthropoda
- Subphylum: Chelicerata
- Class: Arachnida
- Order: Araneae
- Infraorder: Araneomorphae
- Family: Corinnidae
- Genus: Myrmecotypus; O. Pickard-Cambridge, 1894

Type species
- M. fuliginosus O. Pickard-Cambridge, 1894

Species
- 14, see text

Genus of spiders

Myrmecotypus is a genus of ant mimicking corinnid sac spiders first described by O. Pickard-Cambridge in 1894. Species mainly occur from Panama to Mexico, with one species found in the United States, and one in Argentina.

M. rettenmeyeri, named after entomologist Carl Rettenmeyer, has an unusual longitudinal band of black hairs extending along the midline of the cephalothorax, enhancing its resemblance to Camponotus sericeiventris, an ant it shares a habitat with. The black hairs correspond to the solid longitudinal keel-like dorsal extensions of the posterior sections of the ant's thorax.

== Species ==
As of January 2022 it contains fourteen species in North, Central, and South America:

- Myrmecotypus fuliginosus O. Pickard-Cambridge, 1894 (type) – Mexico
- Myrmecotypus haddadi Perger & Rubio, 2021 – Bolivia
- Myrmecotypus iguazu Rubio & Arbino, 2009 – Bolivia, Argentina
- Myrmecotypus jasmineae Leister & Miller, 2014 – Nicaragua
- Myrmecotypus lineatipes Chickering, 1937 – Panama
- Myrmecotypus lineatus (Emerton, 1909) – USA
- Myrmecotypus niger Chickering, 1937 – Panama, Bolivia, Brazil
- Myrmecotypus olympus Reiskind, 1969 – Panama, Brazil
- Myrmecotypus orpheus Reiskind, 1969 – Panama
- Myrmecotypus pilosus (O. Pickard-Cambridge, 1898) – Mexico, Panama
- Myrmecotypus rettenmeyeri Unzicker, 1965 – Panama
- Myrmecotypus rubioi Pett & Perger, 2021 – Bolivia
- Myrmecotypus rubrofemoratus Perger & Rubio, 2021 – Bolivia
- Myrmecotypus tahyinandu Perger & Rubio, 2020 – Bolivia
