= Euderces westcotti =

Scientific classification
- Kingdom: Animalia
- Phylum: Arthropoda
- Clade: Pancrustacea
- Class: Insecta
- Order: Coleoptera
- Suborder: Polyphaga
- Infraorder: Cucujiformia
- Family: Cerambycidae
- Genus: Euderces
- Species: E. westcotti

Binomial name
- Euderces westcotti Hovore, 1988

Species of beetle

Euderces westcotti is a species of beetle in the family Cerambycidae. It was described by Hovore in 1988.
