= Euderces posticus =

Scientific classification
- Kingdom: Animalia
- Phylum: Arthropoda
- Clade: Pancrustacea
- Class: Insecta
- Order: Coleoptera
- Suborder: Polyphaga
- Infraorder: Cucujiformia
- Family: Cerambycidae
- Genus: Euderces
- Species: E. posticus

Binomial name
- Euderces posticus (Pascoe, 1866)

Synonyms
- Apilocera postica Pascoe, 1866

Species of beetle

Euderces posticus is a species of beetle in the family Cerambycidae. It was described by Francis Polkinghorne Pascoe in 1866 and is known from Colombia and Panama.
