= Euderces dilutus =

Scientific classification
- Kingdom: Animalia
- Phylum: Arthropoda
- Clade: Pancrustacea
- Class: Insecta
- Order: Coleoptera
- Suborder: Polyphaga
- Infraorder: Cucujiformia
- Family: Cerambycidae
- Genus: Euderces
- Species: E. dilutus

Binomial name
- Euderces dilutus Martins, 1975

Species of beetle

Euderces dilutus is a species of beetle in the family Cerambycidae. It was described by Martins in 1975.
