= Euderces boucardi =

Scientific classification
- Kingdom: Animalia
- Phylum: Arthropoda
- Clade: Pancrustacea
- Class: Insecta
- Order: Coleoptera
- Suborder: Polyphaga
- Infraorder: Cucujiformia
- Family: Cerambycidae
- Genus: Euderces
- Species: E. boucardi

Binomial name
- Euderces boucardi (Chevrolat, 1862)

Synonyms
- Apilocera boucardi Chevrolat, 1862

Species of beetle

Euderces boucardi is a species of beetle in the family Cerambycidae. It was described by Louis Alexandre Auguste Chevrolat in 1862 and is known from Central and North America, specifically from Costa Rica, Nicaragua, Honduras, Guatemala, and southern Mexico (Chiapas).
