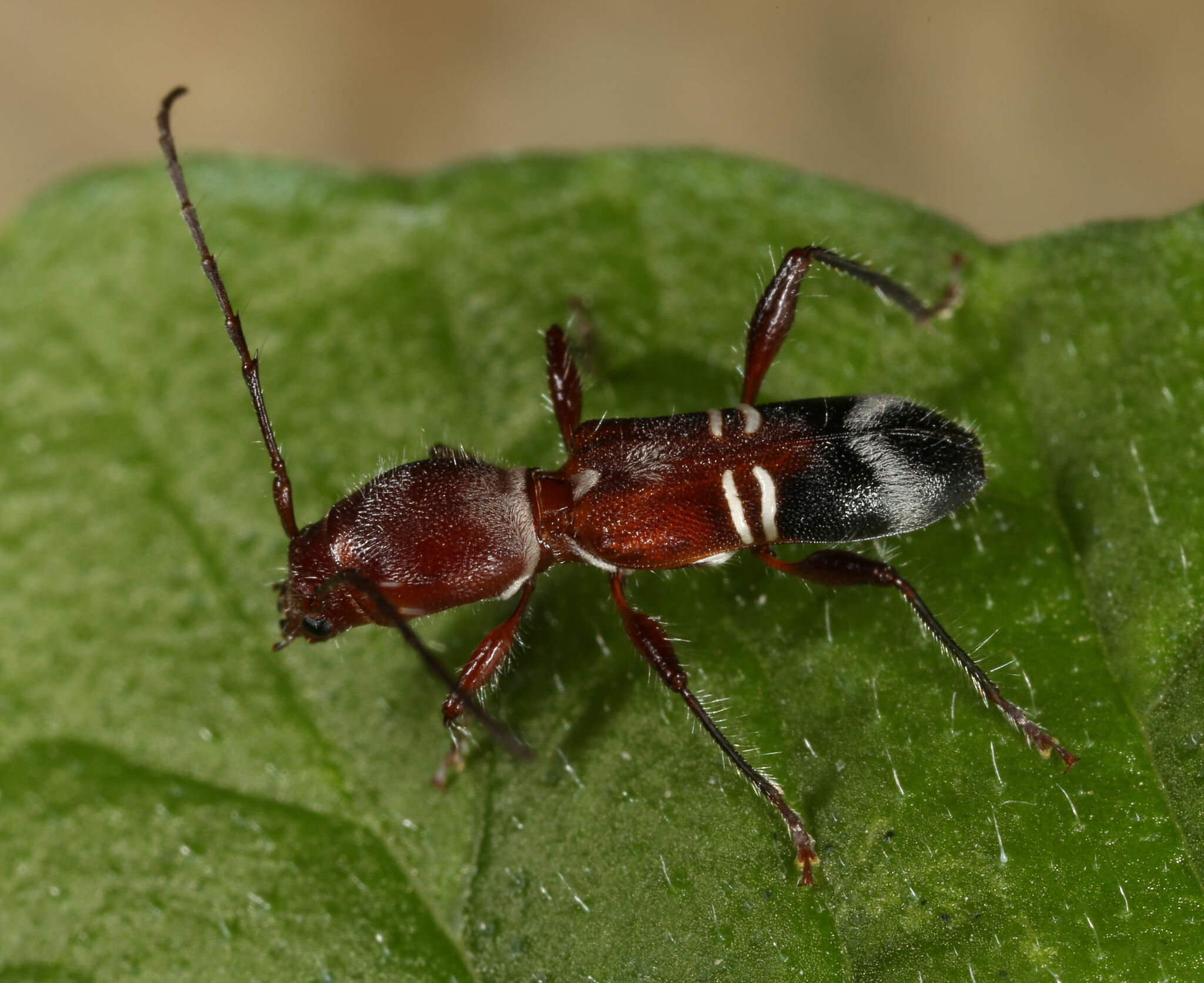

Scientific classification
- Kingdom: Animalia
- Phylum: Arthropoda
- Clade: Pancrustacea
- Class: Insecta
- Order: Coleoptera
- Suborder: Polyphaga
- Infraorder: Cucujiformia
- Family: Cerambycidae
- Genus: Euderces
- Species: E. bicinctus

Binomial name
- Euderces bicinctus (Linsley, 1935)

= Euderces bicinctus =

Species of beetle

Euderces bicinctus is a species of beetle in the family Cerambycidae. It was first described by Linsley in 1935.
