= Euderces cleriformis =

Scientific classification
- Kingdom: Animalia
- Phylum: Arthropoda
- Clade: Pancrustacea
- Class: Insecta
- Order: Coleoptera
- Suborder: Polyphaga
- Infraorder: Cucujiformia
- Family: Cerambycidae
- Genus: Euderces
- Species: E. cleriformis

Binomial name
- Euderces cleriformis (Bates, 1885)

Synonyms
- Apilocera cleriformis Bates, 1885

Species of beetle

Euderces cleriformis is a species of beetle in the family Cerambycidae. It was described by Henry Walter Bates in 1885 and is known from Central and North America between Panama and southern Mexico.
