= Euderces howdeni =

Scientific classification
- Kingdom: Animalia
- Phylum: Arthropoda
- Clade: Pancrustacea
- Class: Insecta
- Order: Coleoptera
- Suborder: Polyphaga
- Infraorder: Cucujiformia
- Family: Cerambycidae
- Genus: Euderces
- Species: E. howdeni

Binomial name
- Euderces howdeni Chemsak, 1969

Species of beetle

Euderces howdeni is a species of beetle in the family Cerambycidae. It was described by Chemsak in 1969.
