= Euderces andersoni =

Scientific classification
- Kingdom: Animalia
- Phylum: Arthropoda
- Clade: Pancrustacea
- Class: Insecta
- Order: Coleoptera
- Suborder: Polyphaga
- Infraorder: Cucujiformia
- Family: Cerambycidae
- Genus: Euderces
- Species: E. andersoni

Binomial name
- Euderces andersoni Giesbert & Chemsak, 1997

Species of beetle

Euderces andersoni is a species of beetle in the family Cerambycidae. It was described by Giesbert and Chemsak in 1997 and is known from Guerrero in southern Mexico. It is named for Robert S. Anderson from the Canadian Museum of Nature in Ottawa.
