= Euderces parallelus =

Scientific classification
- Kingdom: Animalia
- Phylum: Arthropoda
- Clade: Pancrustacea
- Class: Insecta
- Order: Coleoptera
- Suborder: Polyphaga
- Infraorder: Cucujiformia
- Family: Cerambycidae
- Genus: Euderces
- Species: E. parallelus

Binomial name
- Euderces parallelus LeConte, 1873

Species of beetle

Euderces parallelus is a species of beetle in the family Cerambycidae. It was described by John Lawrence LeConte in 1873.
