= Euderces guerinii =

Scientific classification
- Kingdom: Animalia
- Phylum: Arthropoda
- Clade: Pancrustacea
- Class: Insecta
- Order: Coleoptera
- Suborder: Polyphaga
- Infraorder: Cucujiformia
- Family: Cerambycidae
- Genus: Euderces
- Species: E. guerinii

Binomial name
- Euderces guerinii (Chevrolat, 1862)

Synonyms
- Apilocera Guerinii Chevrolat, 1862

Species of beetle

Euderces guerinii is a species of beetle in the family Cerambycidae. It was described by Louis Alexandre Auguste Chevrolat in 1862 and is known from Colombia.
