= Euderces spinicornis =

Scientific classification
- Kingdom: Animalia
- Phylum: Arthropoda
- Clade: Pancrustacea
- Class: Insecta
- Order: Coleoptera
- Suborder: Polyphaga
- Infraorder: Cucujiformia
- Family: Cerambycidae
- Genus: Euderces
- Species: E. spinicornis

Binomial name
- Euderces spinicornis (Chevrolat, 1835)

Synonyms
- Clytus spinicornis Chevrolat, 1835

Species of beetle

Euderces spinicornis is a species of beetle in the family Cerambycidae. It was described by Louis Alexandre Auguste Chevrolat in 1835 and is known from South, Central, and North America, specifically from Colombia, Honduras, Guatemala, and southern Mexico (Veracruz).
