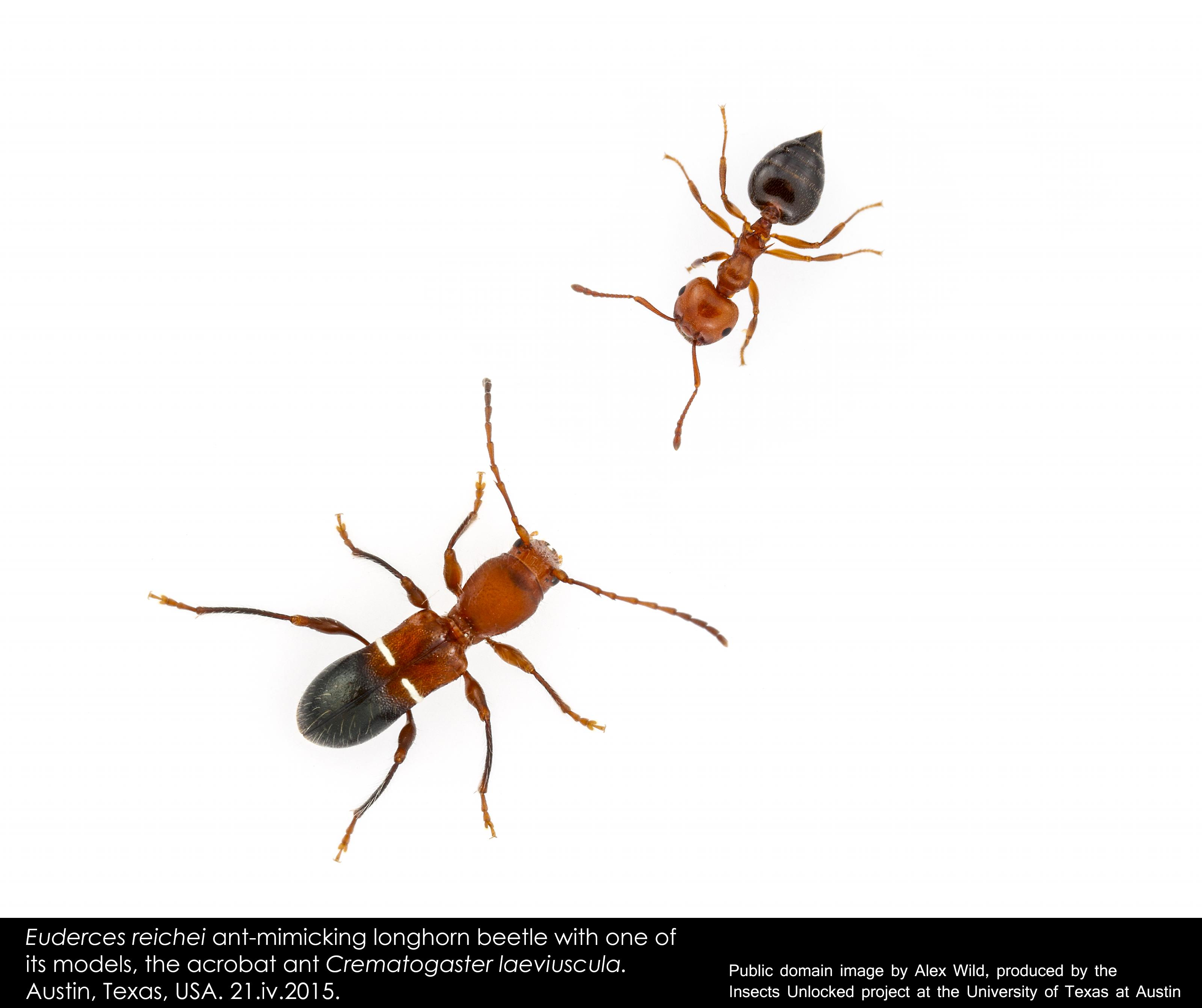

Scientific classification
- Kingdom: Animalia
- Phylum: Arthropoda
- Clade: Pancrustacea
- Class: Insecta
- Order: Coleoptera
- Suborder: Polyphaga
- Infraorder: Cucujiformia
- Family: Cerambycidae
- Genus: Euderces
- Species: E. reichei

Binomial name
- Euderces reichei LeConte, 1873

= Euderces reichei =

Species of beetle

Euderces reichei is a species of beetle in the family Cerambycidae. It was described by John Lawrence LeConte in 1873.
