= Euderces reticulatus =

Scientific classification
- Kingdom: Animalia
- Phylum: Arthropoda
- Clade: Pancrustacea
- Class: Insecta
- Order: Coleoptera
- Suborder: Polyphaga
- Infraorder: Cucujiformia
- Family: Cerambycidae
- Genus: Euderces
- Species: E. reticulatus

Binomial name
- Euderces reticulatus (Bates, 1885)

Synonyms
- Apilocera reticulata Bates, 1885

Species of beetle

Euderces reticulatus is a species of beetle in the family Cerambycidae. It was described by Henry Walter Bates in 1885 and is known from Central and North America, specifically from Belize, Guatemala, and southern Mexico (Veracruz, Chiapas).
