= Euderces yucatecus =

Scientific classification
- Kingdom: Animalia
- Phylum: Arthropoda
- Clade: Pancrustacea
- Class: Insecta
- Order: Coleoptera
- Suborder: Polyphaga
- Infraorder: Cucujiformia
- Family: Cerambycidae
- Genus: Euderces
- Species: E. yucatecus

Binomial name
- Euderces yucatecus (Bates, 1892)

Synonyms
- Apilocera yucateca Bates, 1892

Species of beetle

Euderces yucatecus is a species of beetle in the family Cerambycidae. It was described by Henry Walter Bates in 1892 and is known from Yucatán, Mexico.
