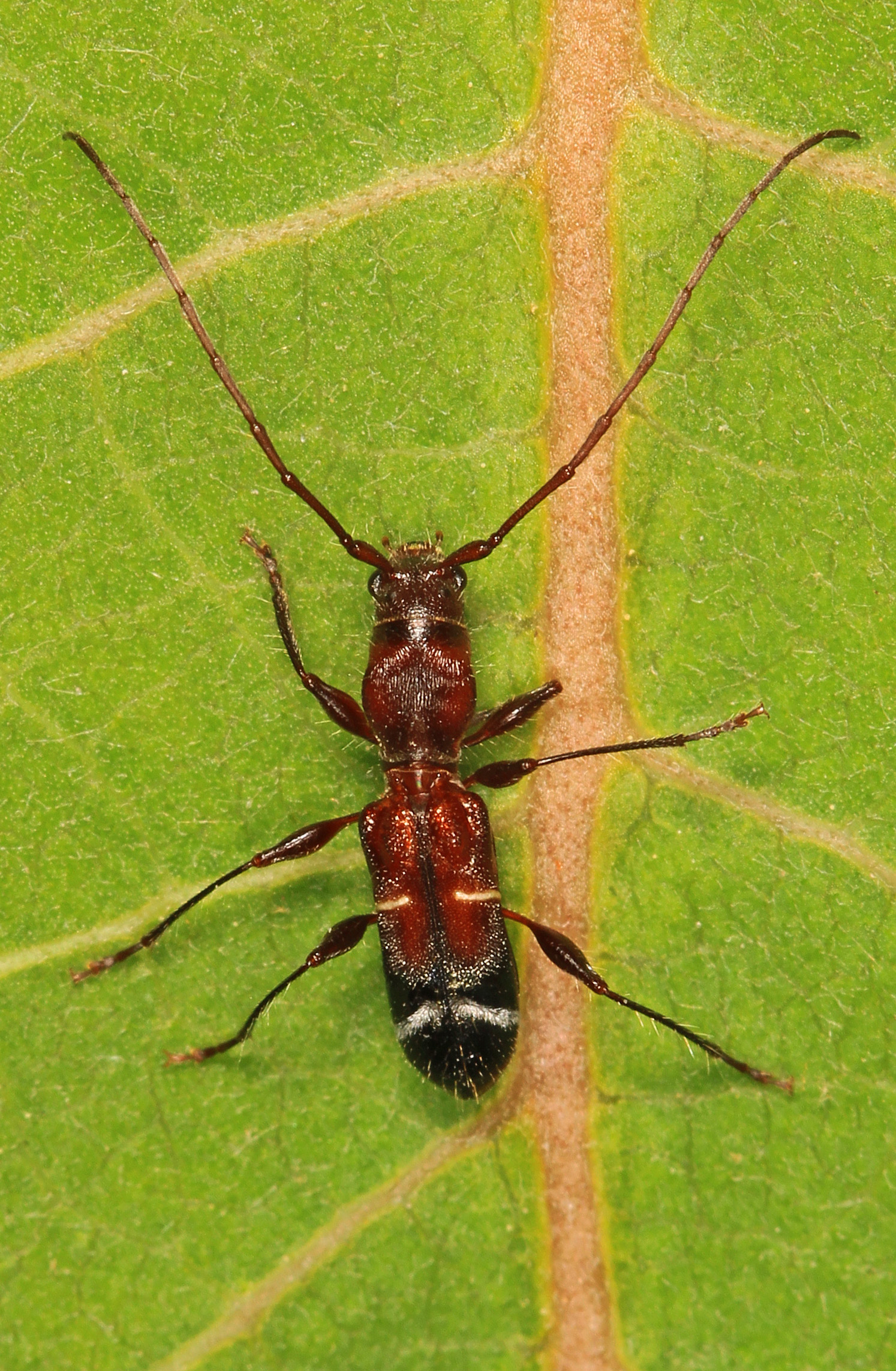
- Euderces pini

Scientific classification
- Kingdom: Animalia
- Phylum: Arthropoda
- Clade: Pancrustacea
- Class: Insecta
- Order: Coleoptera
- Suborder: Polyphaga
- Infraorder: Cucujiformia
- Family: Cerambycidae
- Genus: Euderces
- Species: E. pini

Binomial name
- Euderces pini (Olivier, 1795)

Synonyms
- Callidium pini Olivier, 1795

= Euderces pini =

Species of beetle

Euderces pini is a species of beetle in the family Cerambycidae. It was described by Guillaume-Antoine Olivier in 1795 and is known from the United States, between eastern parts of the country and Texas. Adults have been reared on persimmon trees.
