= Euderces pulcher =

Scientific classification
- Kingdom: Animalia
- Phylum: Arthropoda
- Clade: Pancrustacea
- Class: Insecta
- Order: Coleoptera
- Suborder: Polyphaga
- Infraorder: Cucujiformia
- Family: Cerambycidae
- Genus: Euderces
- Species: E. pulcher

Binomial name
- Euderces pulcher (Bates, 1874)

Synonyms
- Cleozona pulchra Bates, 1874

Species of beetle

Euderces pulcher is a species of beetle in the family Cerambycidae. It was described by Henry Walter Bates in 1874 and is known from Central and North America, specifically from Nicaragua, Honduras, Guatemala, and Mexico. Its larvae feed on Guazuma ulmifolia.
