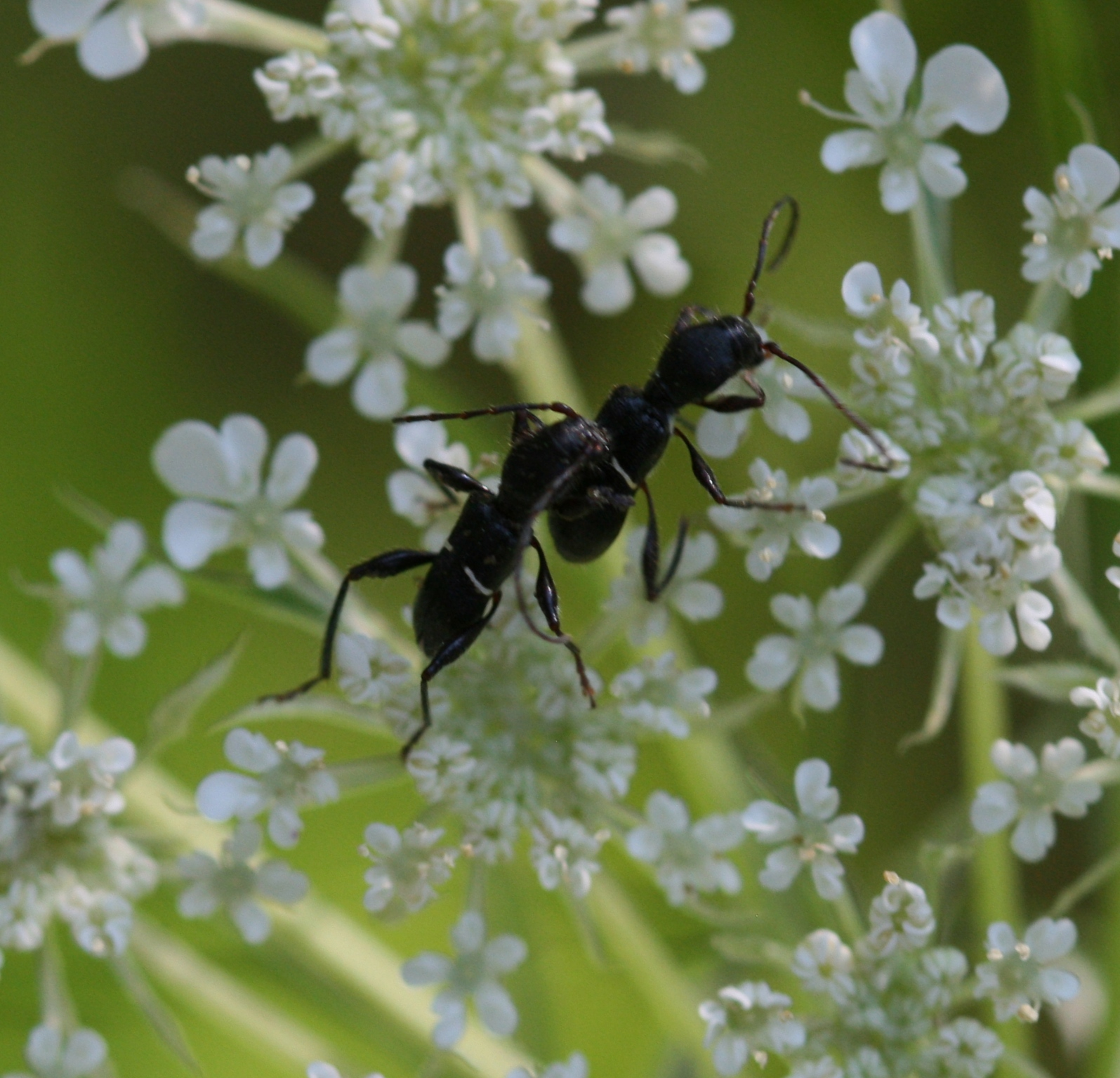

Scientific classification
- Kingdom: Animalia
- Phylum: Arthropoda
- Clade: Pancrustacea
- Class: Insecta
- Order: Coleoptera
- Suborder: Polyphaga
- Infraorder: Cucujiformia
- Family: Cerambycidae
- Genus: Euderces
- Species: E. picipes

Binomial name
- Euderces picipes (Fabricius, 1787)

Synonyms
- Callidium picipes Fabricius, 1787

= Euderces picipes =

Species of beetle

Euderces picipes is a species of beetle in the family Cerambycidae. It was described by Johan Christian Fabricius in 1787 and is known from the United States.
