= Euderces laevicauda =

Scientific classification
- Kingdom: Animalia
- Phylum: Arthropoda
- Clade: Pancrustacea
- Class: Insecta
- Order: Coleoptera
- Suborder: Polyphaga
- Infraorder: Cucujiformia
- Family: Cerambycidae
- Genus: Euderces
- Species: E. laevicauda

Binomial name
- Euderces laevicauda Bates, 1885

Synonyms
- Euderces cribratus Bates, 1885

Species of beetle

Euderces laevicauda is a species of beetle in the family Cerambycidae. It was described by Henry Walter Bates in 1885 and is known from Guatemala and southern Mexico (Oaxaca, Chiapas).
