= Euderces proximus =

Scientific classification
- Kingdom: Animalia
- Phylum: Arthropoda
- Clade: Pancrustacea
- Class: Insecta
- Order: Coleoptera
- Suborder: Polyphaga
- Infraorder: Cucujiformia
- Family: Cerambycidae
- Genus: Euderces
- Species: E. proximus

Binomial name
- Euderces proximus Giesbert & Chemsak, 1997

Species of beetle

Euderces proximus is a species of beetle in the family Cerambycidae. It was described by Giesbert and Chemsak in 1997.
