= Myrmecotypus lineatus =

Scientific classification
- Domain: Eukaryota
- Kingdom: Animalia
- Phylum: Arthropoda
- Subphylum: Chelicerata
- Class: Arachnida
- Order: Araneae
- Infraorder: Araneomorphae
- Family: Corinnidae
- Genus: Myrmecotypus
- Species: M. lineatus

Binomial name
- Myrmecotypus lineatus (Emerton, 1909)

Species of spider

Myrmecotypus lineatus is a species of true spider in the family Corinnidae. It is found in the United States.
