= Euderces aspericollis =

Scientific classification
- Kingdom: Animalia
- Phylum: Arthropoda
- Clade: Pancrustacea
- Class: Insecta
- Order: Coleoptera
- Suborder: Polyphaga
- Infraorder: Cucujiformia
- Family: Cerambycidae
- Genus: Euderces
- Species: E. aspericollis

Binomial name
- Euderces aspericollis (Chemsak, 1969)

Species of beetle

Euderces aspericollis is a species of beetle in the family Cerambycidae. It was described by Chemsak in 1969.
