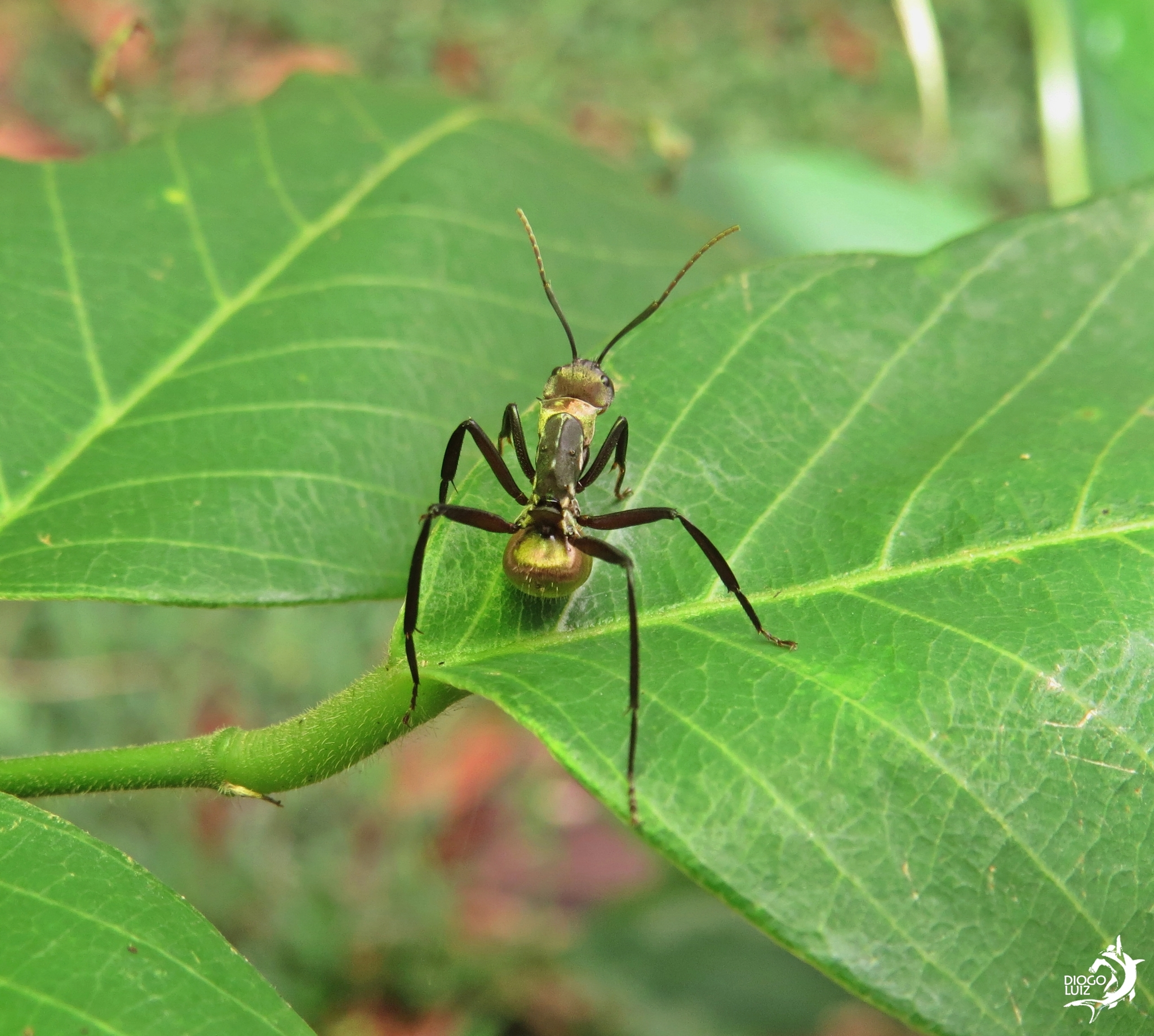

Scientific classification
- Domain: Eukaryota
- Kingdom: Animalia
- Phylum: Arthropoda
- Class: Insecta
- Order: Hymenoptera
- Family: Formicidae
- Subfamily: Formicinae
- Tribe: Camponotini
- Genus: Camponotus
- Subgenus: Myrmepomis
- Species: C. sericeiventris

Binomial name
- Camponotus sericeiventris (Guerin-Meneville, 1838)

= Camponotus sericeiventris =

Species of ant

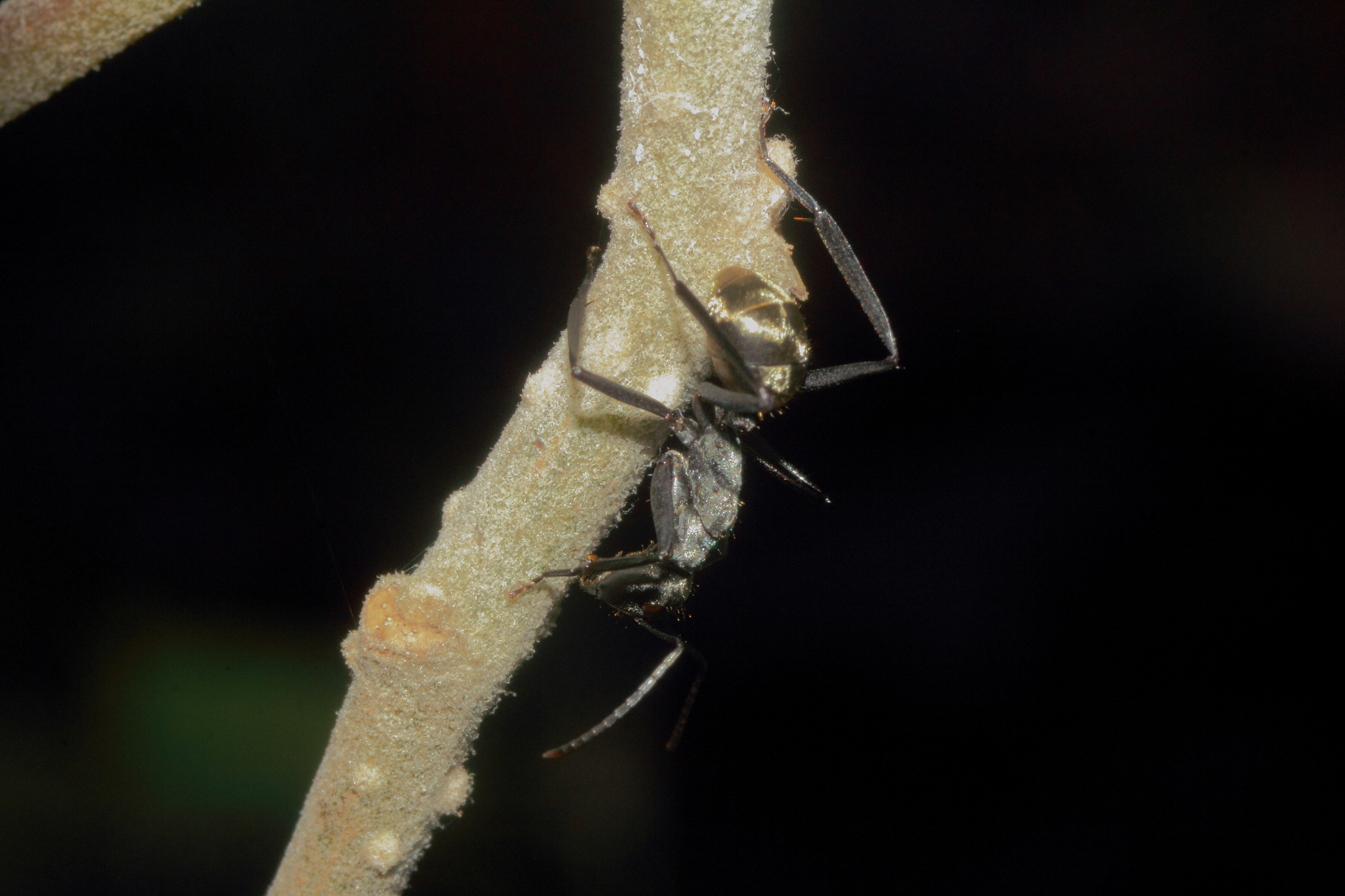
Camponotus sericeiventris, Mexico

Camponotus sericeiventris, the shimmering golden sugar ant, is a species of carpenter ant native to large parts of Central and South America. It is the only species in the subgenus Myrmepomis.

== Subspecies ==
These five subspecies belong to the species Camponotus sericeiventris:

- C. sericeiventris holmgreni Wheeler, 1931
- C. sericeiventris otoquensis Wheeler, 1931
- C. sericeiventris pontifex Santschi, 1936
- C. sericeiventris rex Forel, 1907
- C. sericeiventris satrapus Wheeler, 1931
