= List of Polyrhachis species =

Polyrhachis is a large genus of formicine ants found in the Old World. As of 2026, it comprises 712 species and numerous subspecies. One species, Polyrhachis annosa, is extinct. This list of species is based on AntCat.

== A ==
- Polyrhachis abbreviata Kohout, 2006
- Polyrhachis abdita Kohout, 2007
- Polyrhachis abdominalis Smith, F., 1858

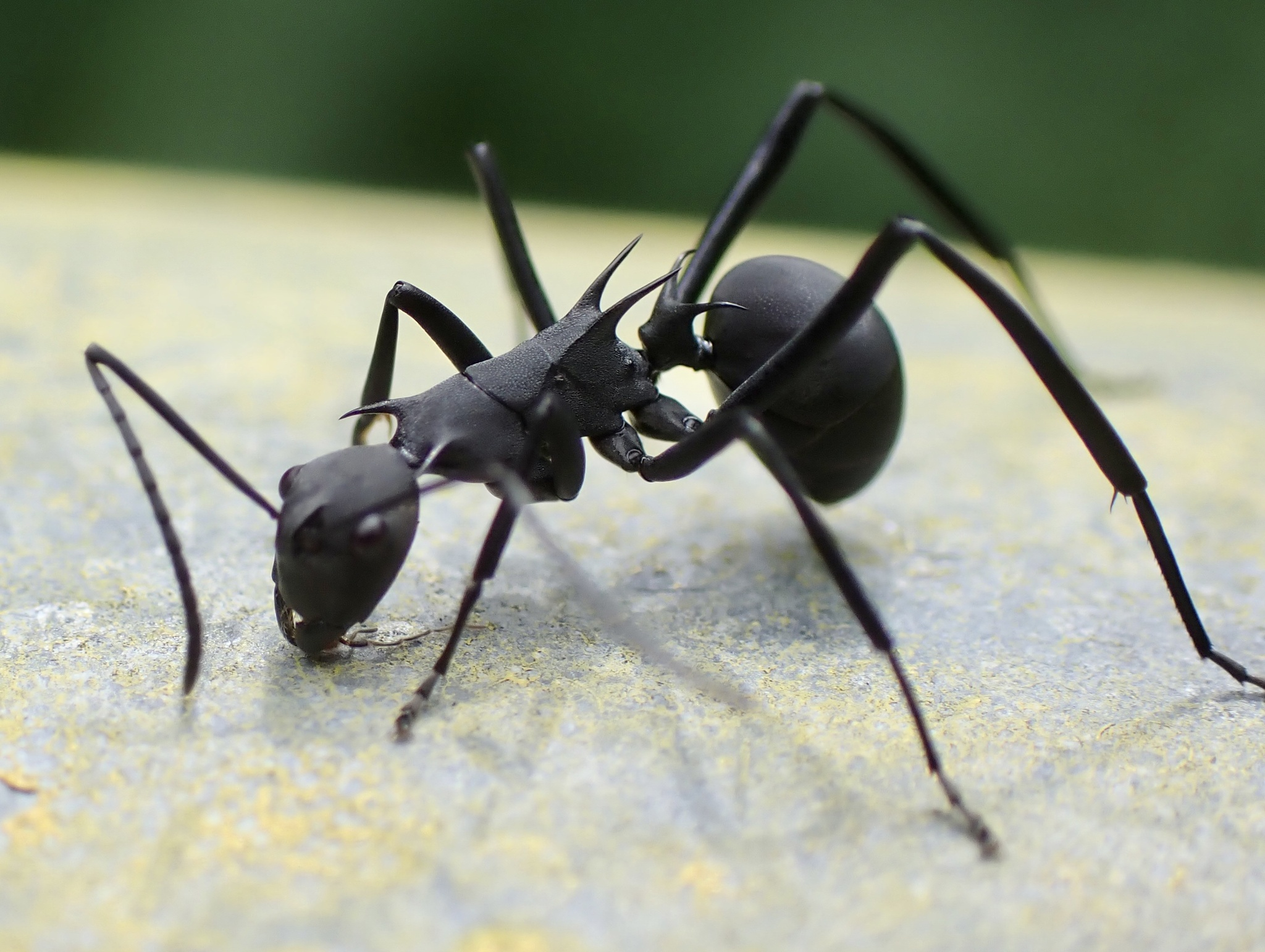
P. abdominalis

- Polyrhachis aberrans Kohout, 2008
- Polyrhachis abnormis Donisthorpe, 1948
- Polyrhachis abrupta Mayr, 1867
- Polyrhachis achterbergi Kohout, 2006
- Polyrhachis aculeata Mayr, 1879
- Polyrhachis acuminata Kohout, 2007
- Polyrhachis aenescens Stitz, 1910
- Polyrhachis aequalis Forel, 1910
- Polyrhachis aerope Wheeler, 1922
- Polyrhachis agesilas Forel, 1913
- Polyrhachis alata Forel, 1904
- Polyrhachis alatisquamis Forel, 1893
- Polyrhachis albertisi Emery, 1887
- Polyrhachis alexisi Forel, 1916
- Polyrhachis alluaudi Emery, 1892
- Polyrhachis alphea Smith, 1863
- Polyrhachis alphena Smith, 1860
- Polyrhachis amana Smith, 1861
- Polyrhachis ammon (Fabricius, 1775)

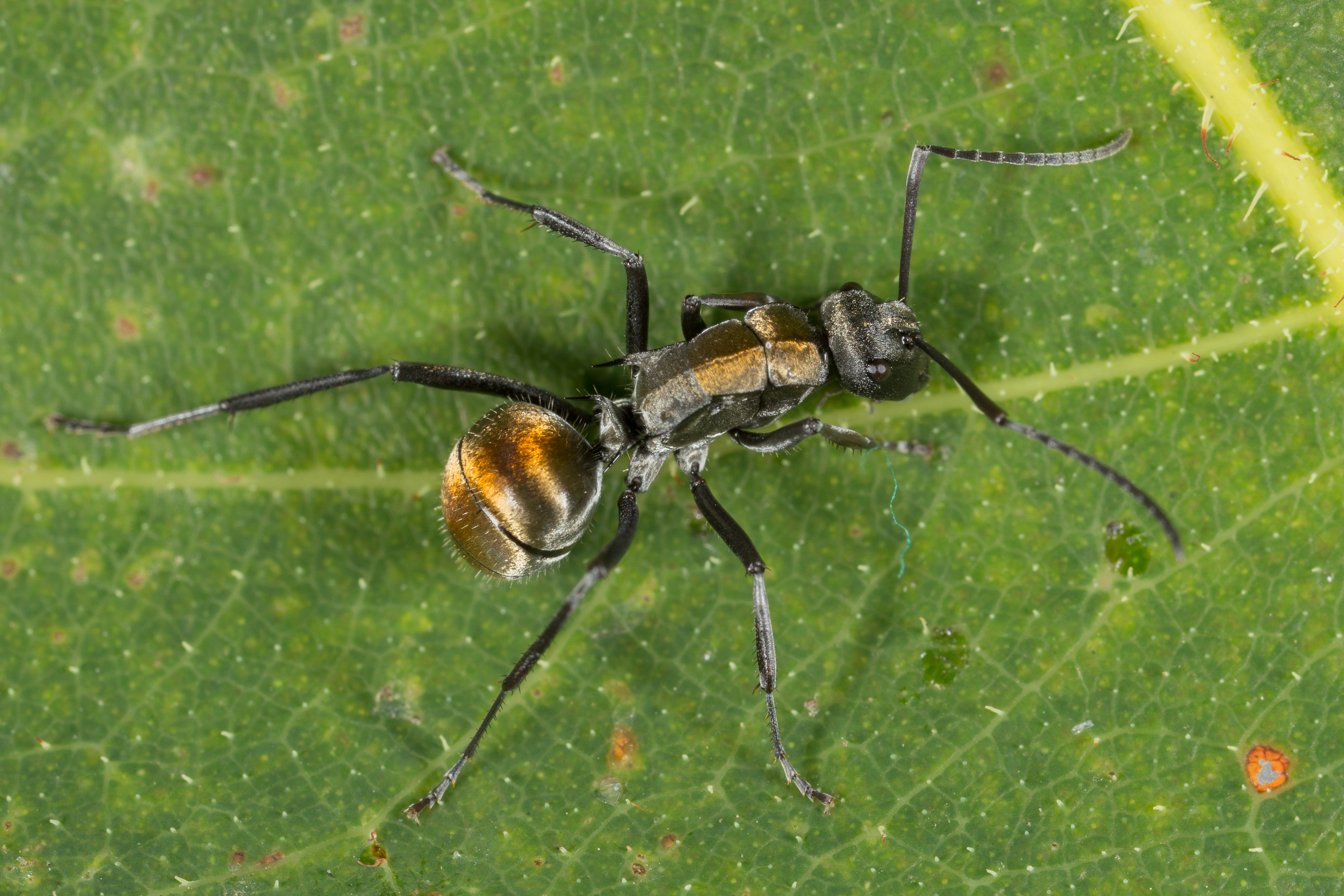
P. ammon

- Polyrhachis ammonoeides Roger, 1863
- Polyrhachis anderseni Kohout, 2013
- Polyrhachis andrei Emery, 1921
- Polyrhachis andromache Roger, 1863
- Polyrhachis angusta Forel, 1902
- Polyrhachis annae Mann, 1919
- Polyrhachis annulata Kohout, 2007
- Polyrhachis antennata Viehmeyer, 1912
- Polyrhachis antoniae Stitz, 1911
- Polyrhachis aporema Kohout, 2006
- Polyrhachis appendiculata Emery, 1893
- Polyrhachis arachne Emery, 1896
- Polyrhachis arborea Kohout, 2006
- Polyrhachis archeri Kohout, 2013
- Polyrhachis arcuata (Le Guillou, 1842)
- Polyrhachis argenteosignata Emery, 1900
- Polyrhachis argentosa Forel, 1902
- Polyrhachis armata (Le Guillou, 1842)

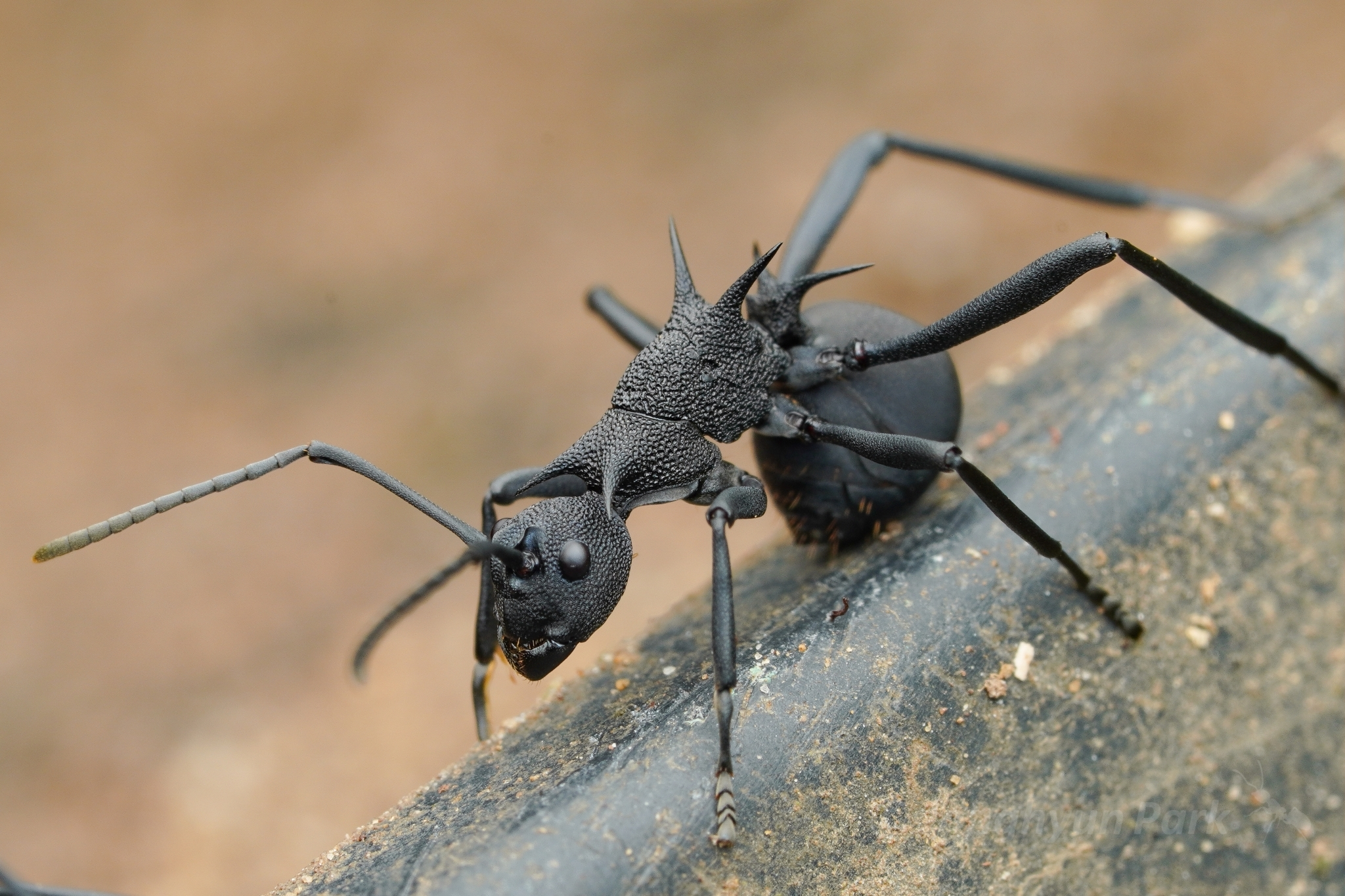
P. armata

- Polyrhachis arnoldi Forel, 1914
- Polyrhachis aruensis Viehmeyer, 1912
- Polyrhachis asomaningi Bolton, 1973
- Polyrhachis aspasia Forel, 1911
- Polyrhachis atossa Forel, 1913
- Polyrhachis atropos Smith, 1860
- Polyrhachis atrovirens Emery, 1900
- Polyrhachis aurea Mayr, 1876

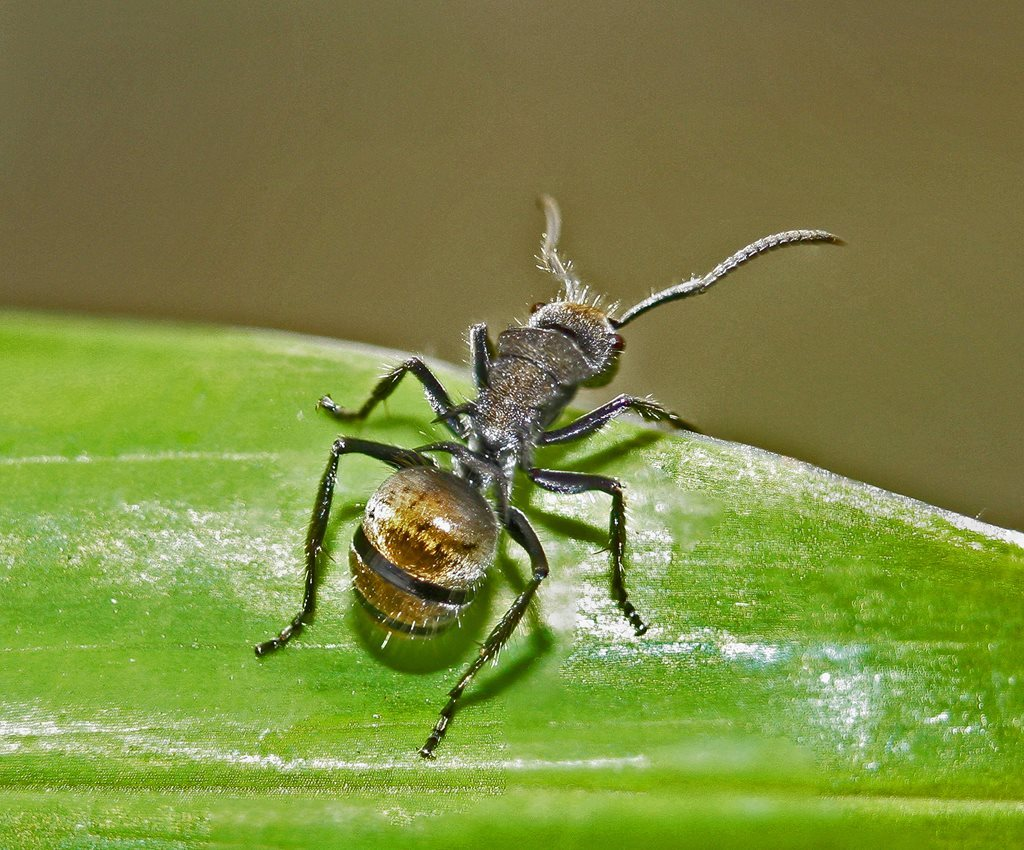
P. aurea

- Polyrhachis aureovestita Donisthorpe, 1937
- Polyrhachis auriformis Donisthorpe, 1943
- Polyrhachis aurita Emery, 1911
- Polyrhachis aurora Kohout, 2013
- Polyrhachis australis Mayr, 1870

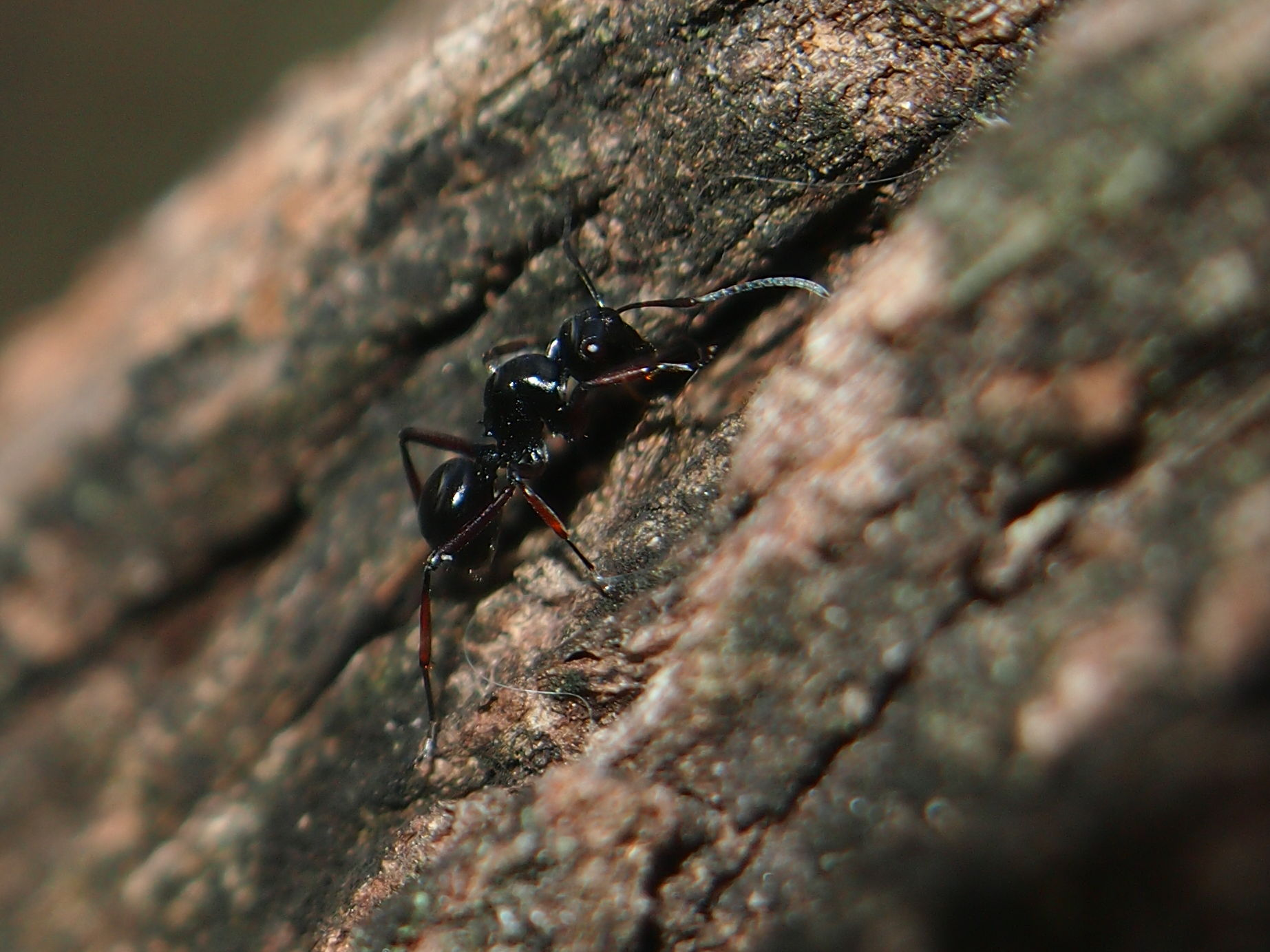
P. australis

== B ==
- Polyrhachis baca Sorger & Zettel, 2010
- Polyrhachis bakana Xu, 1998
- Polyrhachis bakeri Viehmeyer, 1916
- Polyrhachis bamaga Kohout, 1990
- Polyrhachis banghaasi Viehmeyer, 1922
- Polyrhachis barretti Clark, 1928
- Polyrhachis barryi Kohout, 2006
- Polyrhachis basirufa Emery, 1900
- Polyrhachis batesi Forel, 1911
- Polyrhachis beauforti Emery, 1911
- Polyrhachis beccarii Mayr, 1872
- Polyrhachis becvari Zettel & Ockermüller, 2023
- Polyrhachis bedeloweryi Kohout, 2006
- Polyrhachis bedoti Forel, 1902
- Polyrhachis bellicosa Smith, 1859
- Polyrhachis bicolor Smith, 1858

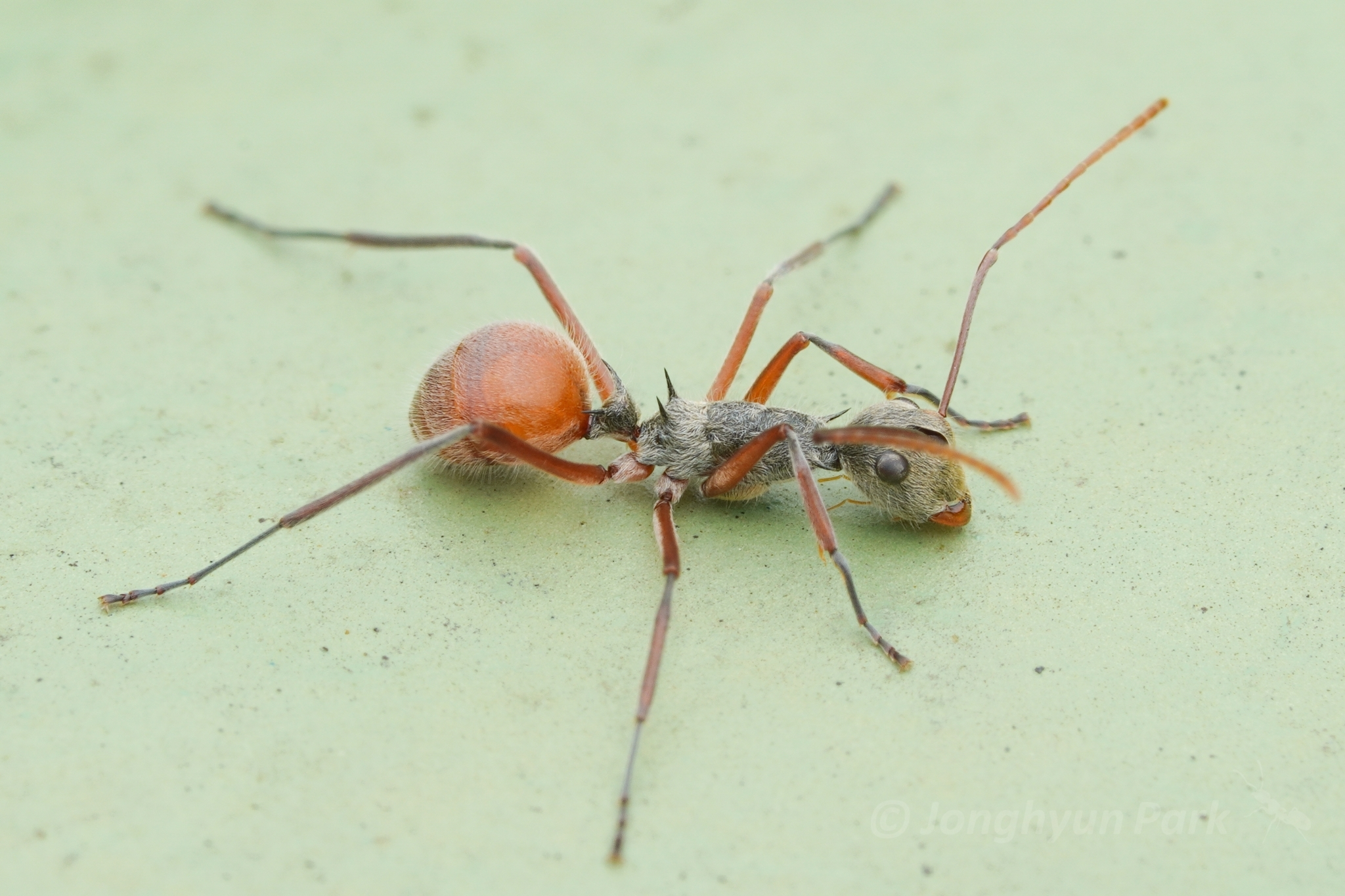
P. bicolor

- Polyrhachis bihamata (Drury, 1773)

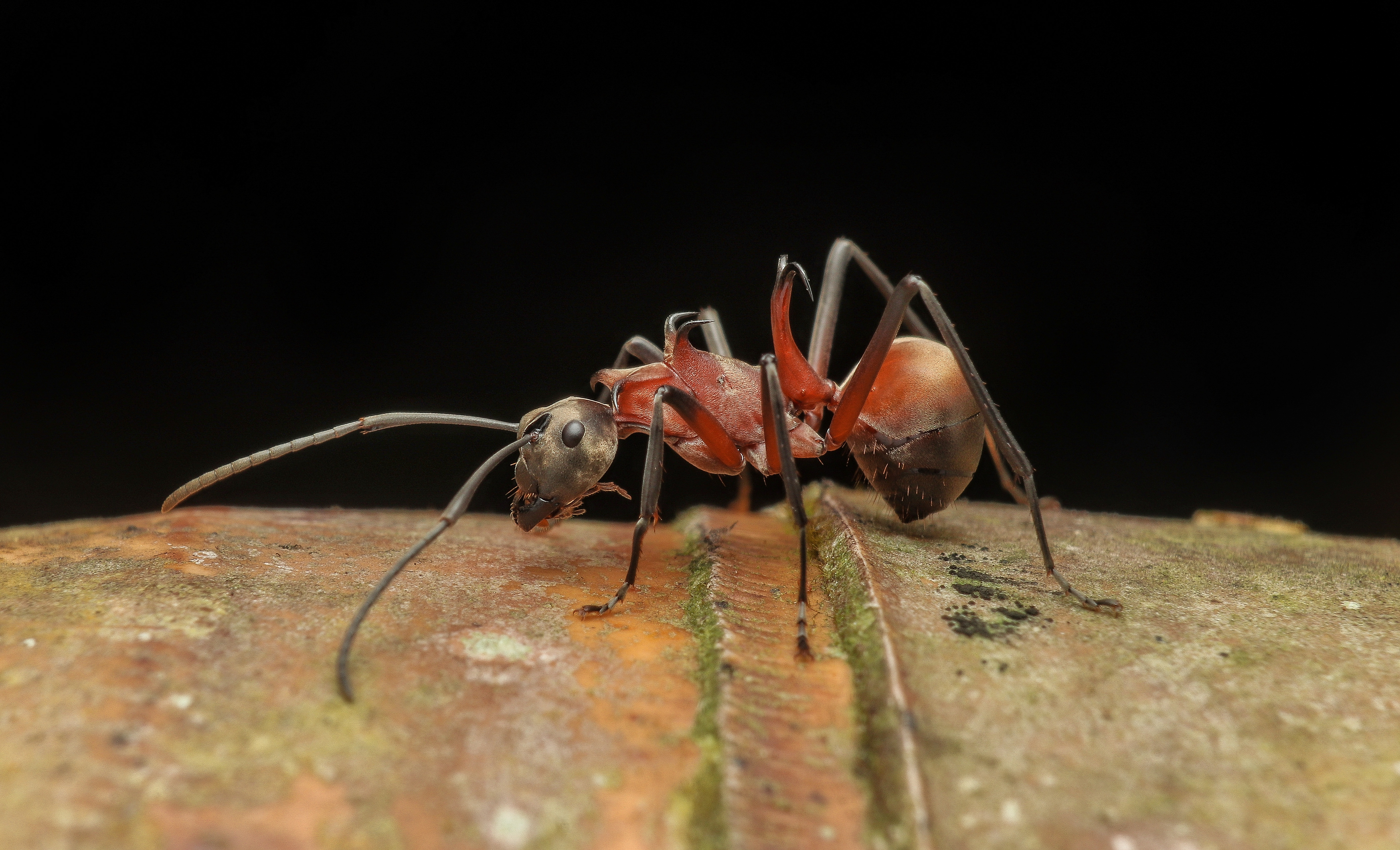
P. bihamata

- Polyrhachis binghamii Forel, 1893
- Polyrhachis bismarckensis Forel, 1901
- Polyrhachis bispinosa Kohout, 2013
- Polyrhachis bohemia Kohout, 2013
- Polyrhachis boltoni Dorow & Kohout, 1995
- Polyrhachis bosi Kohout, 2008
- Polyrhachis bouvieri Santschi, 1928
- Polyrhachis brachyspina Kohout, 2008
- Polyrhachis braxa Bolton, 1973
- Polyrhachis brendelli Kohout, 2008
- Polyrhachis breviata Kohout, 2007
- Polyrhachis brevicorpa Xu, 2002
- Polyrhachis brevinoda Kohout, 2006
- Polyrhachis breviorspinosa Donisthorpe, 1947
- Polyrhachis brevipilosa Rigato, 2016
- Polyrhachis brisbanensis Kohout, 2013

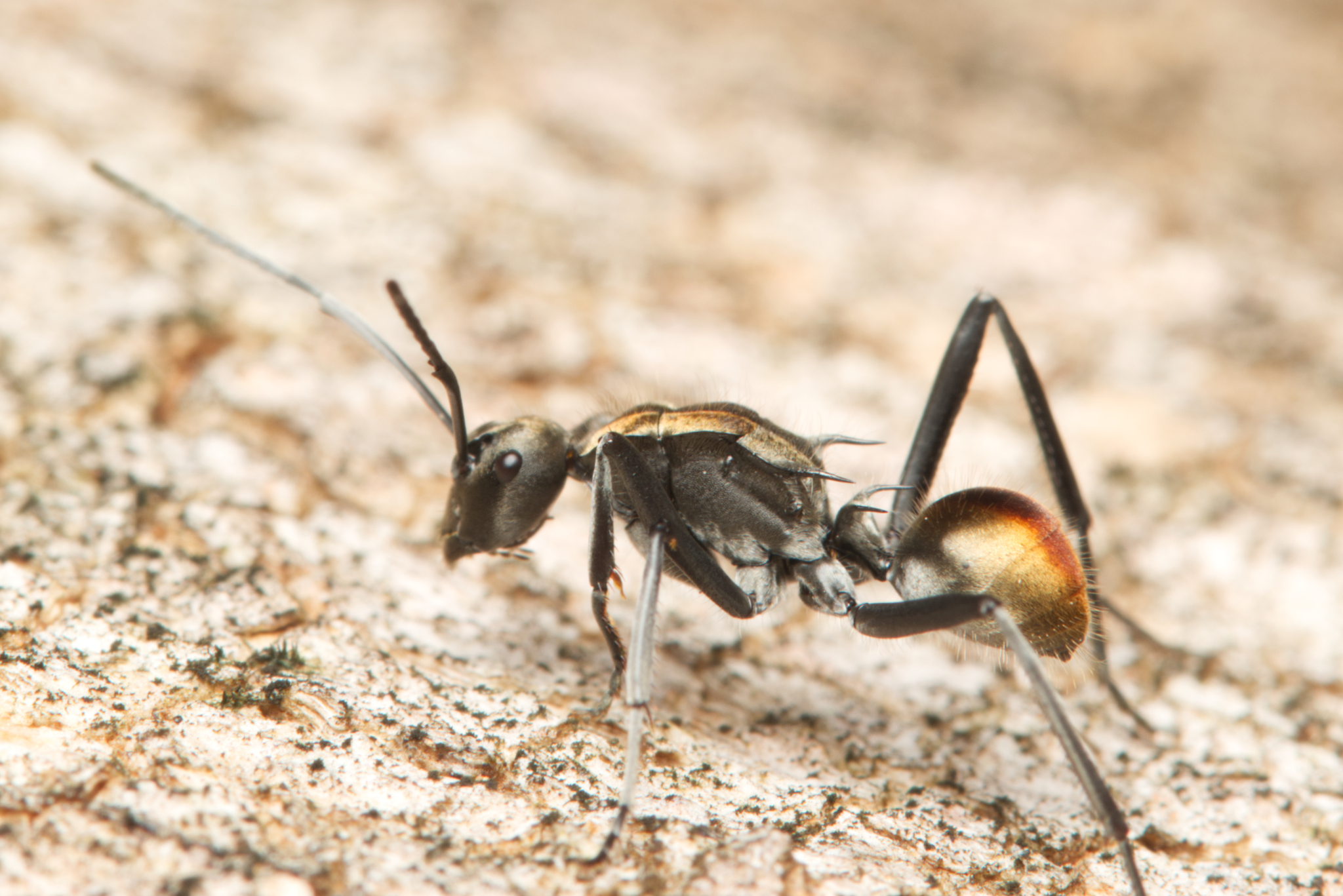
P. brisbanensis

- Polyrhachis browni Kohout, 2008
- Polyrhachis bruehli Kohout, 2006
- Polyrhachis brutella Kohout, 2013
- Polyrhachis bubastes Smith, 1863
- Polyrhachis bugnioni Forel, 1908
- Polyrhachis burmanensis Donisthorpe, 1938
- Polyrhachis burwelli Kohout, 2013
- Polyrhachis busiris Smith, 1860

== C ==
- Polyrhachis caeciliae Forel, 1912
- Polyrhachis callima Kohout, 2013
- Polyrhachis calliope Emery, 1900
- Polyrhachis calypso Forel, 1911
- Polyrhachis campbelli Mann, 1919
- Polyrhachis capeyorkensis Kohout, 2013
- Polyrhachis capillata Kohout, 2013
- Polyrhachis captiva Kohout, 2013
- Polyrhachis carbonaria Smith, 1857
- Polyrhachis carinata Fabricius, 1804
- Polyrhachis castaneiventris Smith, 1858
- Polyrhachis caulomma Viehmeyer, 1914
- Polyrhachis cedarensis Forel, 1915
- Polyrhachis celebensis Viehmeyer, 1913
- Polyrhachis cephalotes Emery, 1893
- Polyrhachis ceramensis Mayr, 1883
- Polyrhachis chaita Kohout, 2008
- Polyrhachis chalybea Smith, 1857

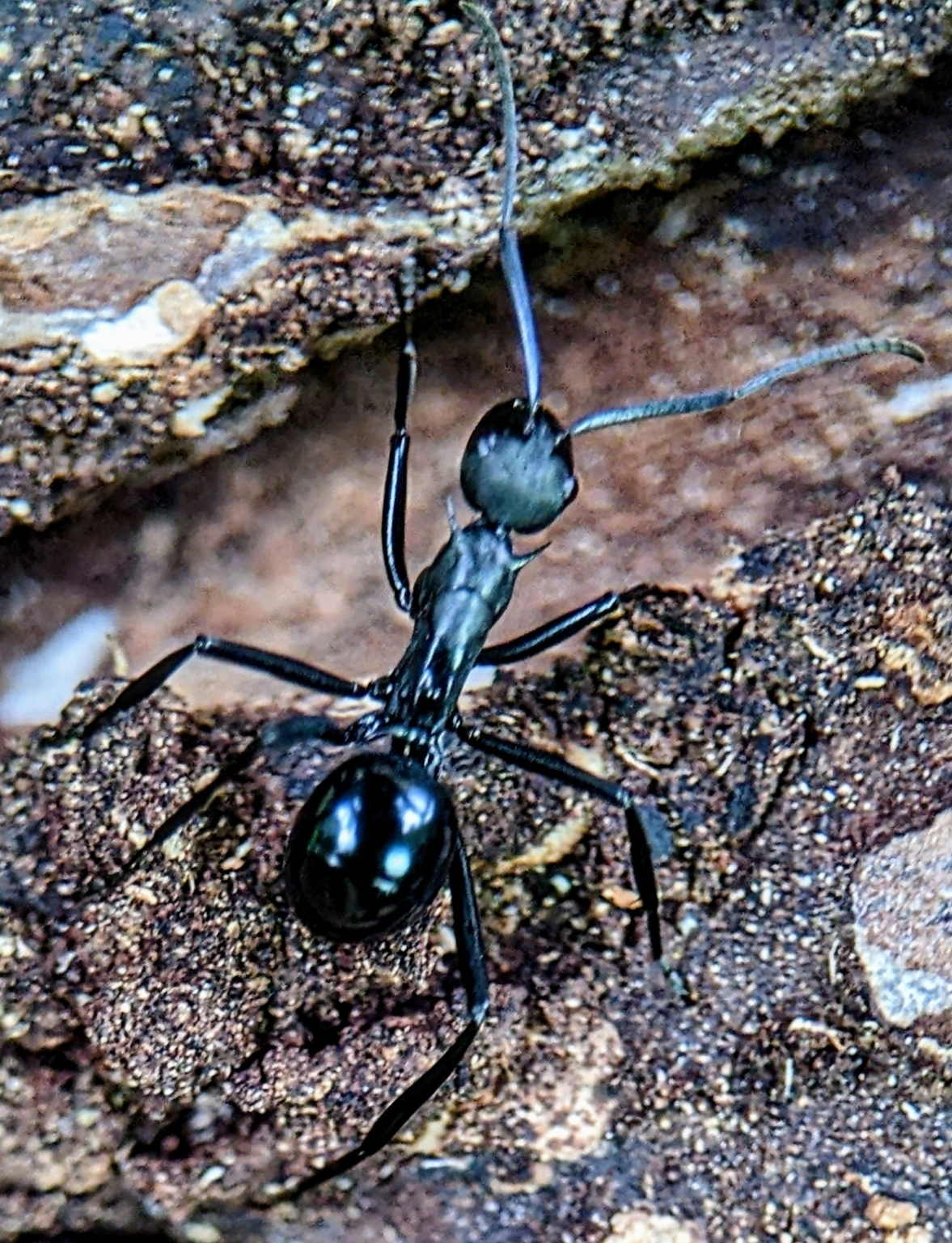
P. chalybea

- Polyrhachis chapmani Kohout, 2006
- Polyrhachis charaxa Smith, 1860
- Polyrhachis chartifex Emery, 1900
- Polyrhachis cheesmanae Donisthorpe, 1937
- Polyrhachis cincta Viehmeyer, 1913
- Polyrhachis cingula Donisthorpe, 1947
- Polyrhachis circumdata Viehmeyer, 1913
- Polyrhachis clarkei Donisthorpe, 1949
- Polyrhachis clarki Kohout, 2013
- Polyrhachis cleopatra Forel, 1902

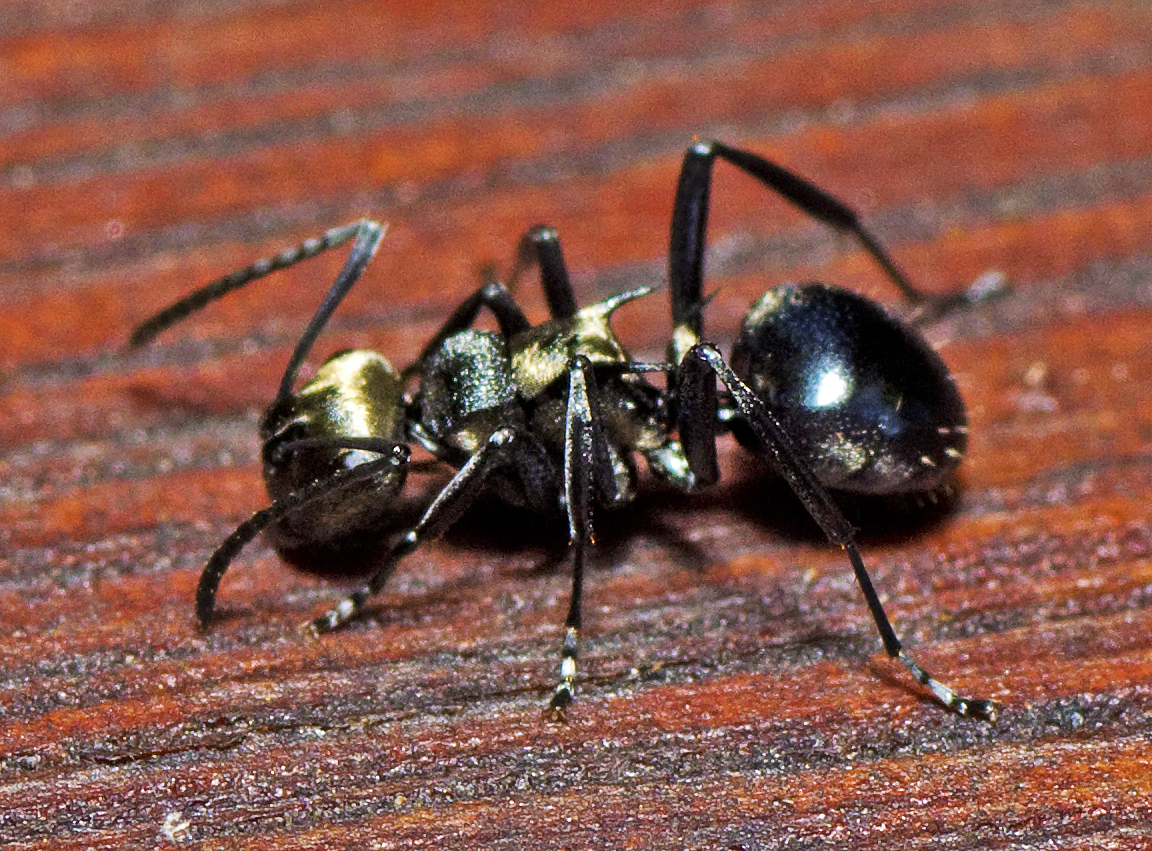
P. cleopatra

- Polyrhachis cleophanes Smith, 1861
- Polyrhachis clio Forel, 1902

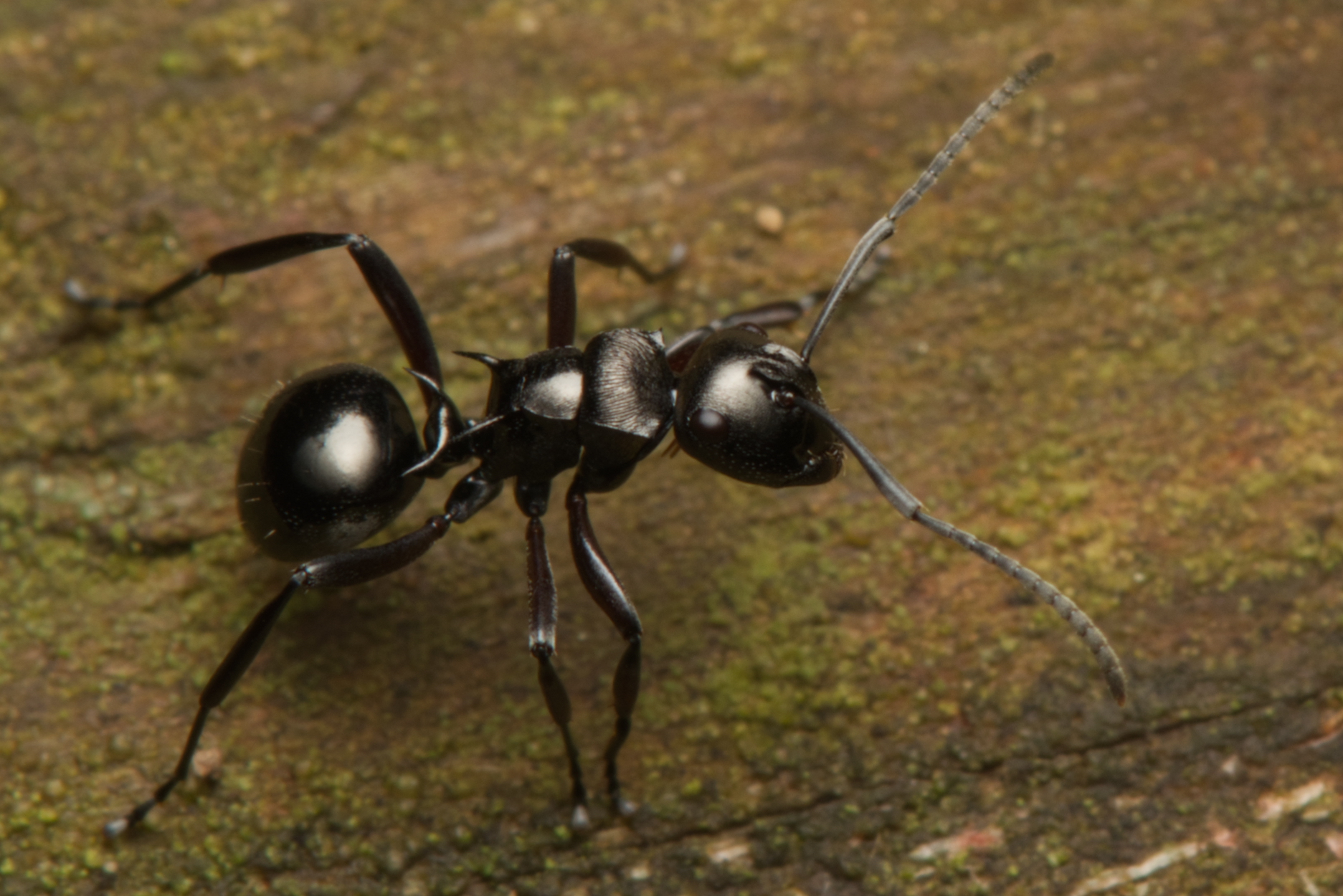
P. clio

- Polyrhachis clotho Forel, 1902
- Polyrhachis coerulescens Emery, 1897
- Polyrhachis cognata Kohout, 2008
- Polyrhachis compressicornis Smith, 1860
- Polyrhachis concava Andre, 1889
- Polyrhachis conciliata Kohout, 2013
- Polyrhachis confusa Wong & Guénard, 2020
- Polyrhachis conops Forel, 1901
- Polyrhachis consimilis Smith, 1858
- Polyrhachis conspicua Kohout, 2006
- Polyrhachis constricta Emery, 1897
- Polyrhachis constructor Smith, 1857
- Polyrhachis contemta Mayr, 1876
- Polyrhachis continua Emery, 1887
- Polyrhachis convexa Roger, 1863
- Polyrhachis cornihumera Xu, 2002
- Polyrhachis cornuhumera Zhou & Huang, 2002
- Polyrhachis cornuta Stitz, 1910
- Polyrhachis corporaali Santschi, 1928
- Polyrhachis costulata Emery, 1897
- Polyrhachis cracenta Kohout, 2013
- Polyrhachis craddocki Bingham, 1903
- Polyrhachis crassispinosa Viehmeyer, 1914
- Polyrhachis crawleyi Forel, 1916
- Polyrhachis creusa Emery, 1897
- Polyrhachis croceiventris Emery, 1900
- Polyrhachis cryptoceroides Emery, 1887
- Polyrhachis cubaensis Mayr, 1862
- Polyrhachis cupreata Emery, 1895

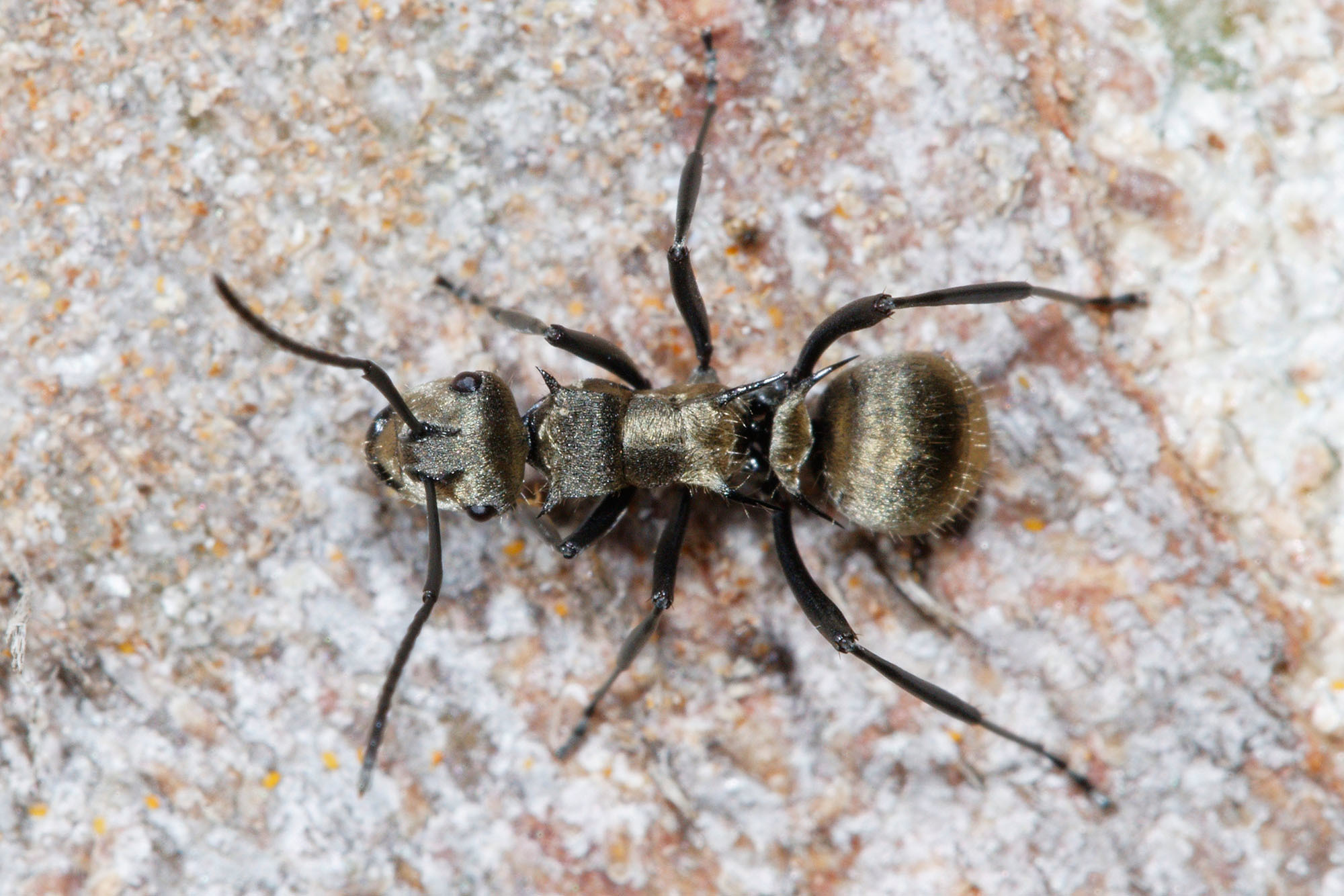
P. cupreata

- Polyrhachis curta Emery, 1890
- Polyrhachis curvispina Forel, 1908
- Polyrhachis cyaniventris Smith, 1858
- Polyrhachis cybele Wheeler, 1919
- Polyrhachis cydista Kohout, 2008
- Polyrhachis cyphonota Xu, 1998
- Polyrhachis cyrus Forel, 1901

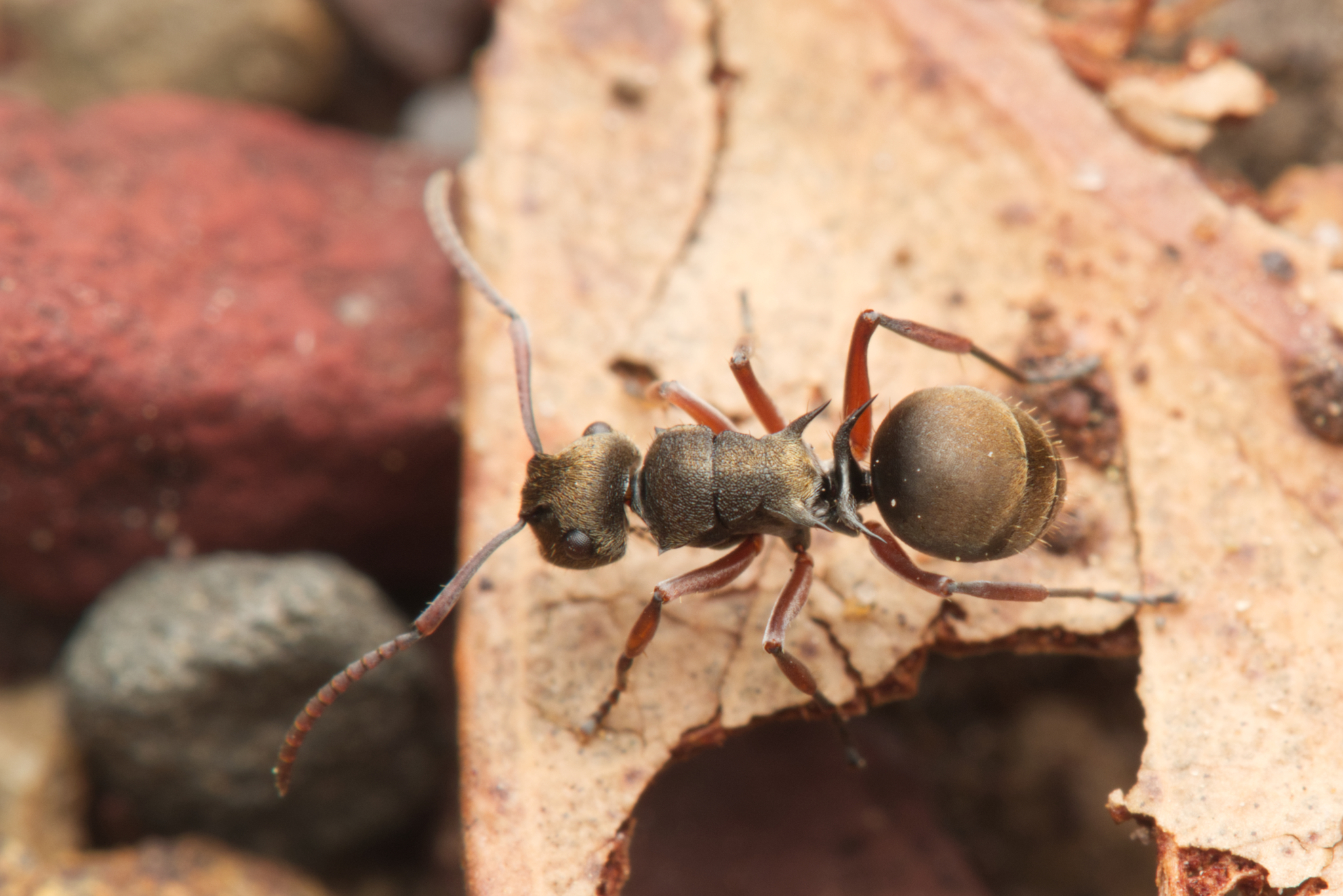
P. cyrus

== D ==
- Polyrhachis daemeli Mayr, 1876

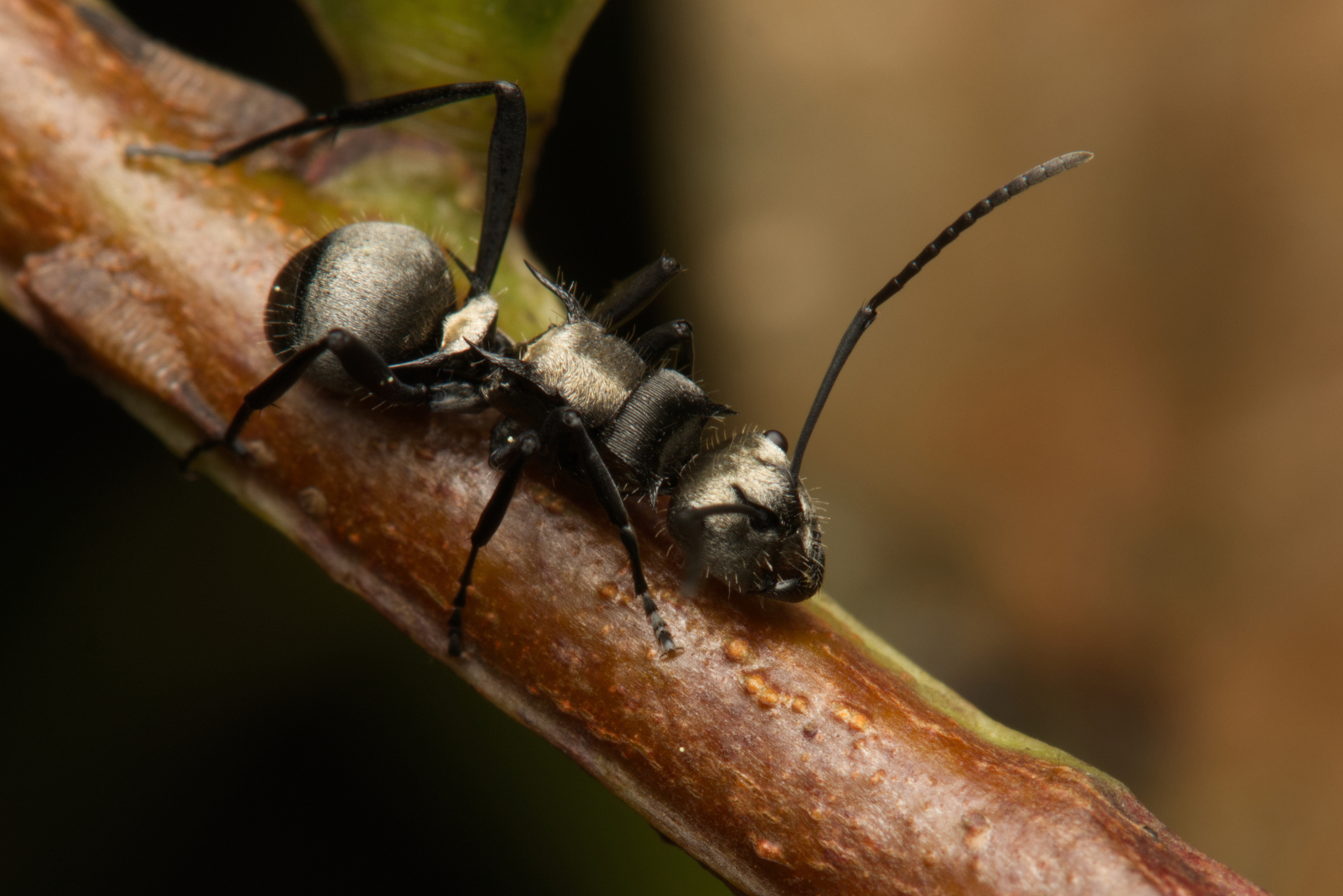
P. daemeli

- Polyrhachis dahlii Forel, 1901
- Polyrhachis danum Kohout, 2006
- Polyrhachis daphne Wheeler, 1919
- Polyrhachis darlingtoni Kohout, 2013
- Polyrhachis davydovi Karavaiev, 1927
- Polyrhachis debilis Emery, 1887
- Polyrhachis decellei Bolton, 1973
- Polyrhachis decemdentata Andre, 1889
- Polyrhachis deceptor Kohout, 2008
- Polyrhachis decipiens Roger, 1863
- Polyrhachis decora Kohout, 2007
- Polyrhachis decumbens Kohout, 2006
- Polyrhachis delecta Kohout, 2006
- Polyrhachis delicata Crawley, 1915
- Polyrhachis demangei Santschi, 1910

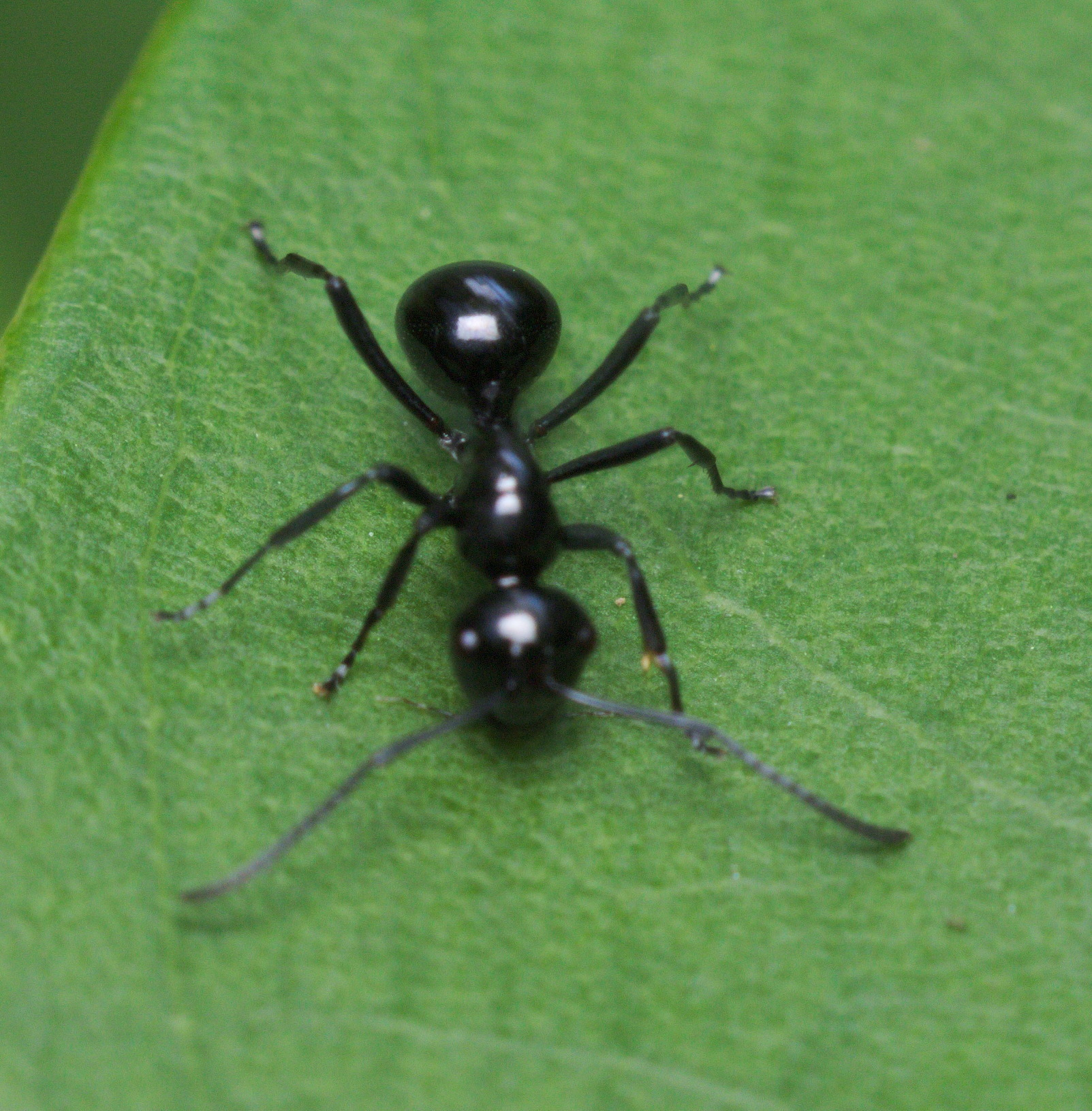
P. demangei

- Polyrhachis denselineata Viehmeyer, 1914
- Polyrhachis dentata Donisthorpe, 1947
- Polyrhachis denticulata Karavaiev, 1927
- Polyrhachis dentihumera Xu, 2002
- Polyrhachis derecyna Smith, 1871
- Polyrhachis diana Wheeler, 1909
- Polyrhachis diaphanta Smith, 1861
- Polyrhachis dimoculata Kohout, 2013
- Polyrhachis diotima Forel, 1911
- Polyrhachis dispar Kohout, 2010
- Polyrhachis diversa Kohout, 2013
- Polyrhachis dives Smith, 1857
- Polyrhachis dohrni Forel, 1901
- Polyrhachis dolomedes Smith, 1863
- Polyrhachis dorowi Kohout, 2009
- Polyrhachis dorsena Kohout, 2006
- Polyrhachis dostali Zettel, 2019
- Polyrhachis doudou Rigato, 2016
- Polyrhachis dougcooki Kohout, 2013
- Polyrhachis dubia Rigato, 2016
- Polyrhachis durbanensis Forel, 1914
- Polyrhachis durvillei Donisthorpe, 1938

== E ==
- Polyrhachis edentula Emery, 1900
- Polyrhachis edwardi Donisthorpe, 1948
- Polyrhachis electra Kohout, 2013
- Polyrhachis elegantula Kohout, 2013
- Polyrhachis elii Emery, 1900
- Polyrhachis emeryana Mann, 1919
- Polyrhachis emmae Santschi, 1920
- Polyrhachis empesoi Kohout, 2006
- Polyrhachis enigma Kohout, 2006
- Polyrhachis epinotalis Santschi, 1924
- Polyrhachis equina Smith, 1857
- Polyrhachis erato Forel, 1902

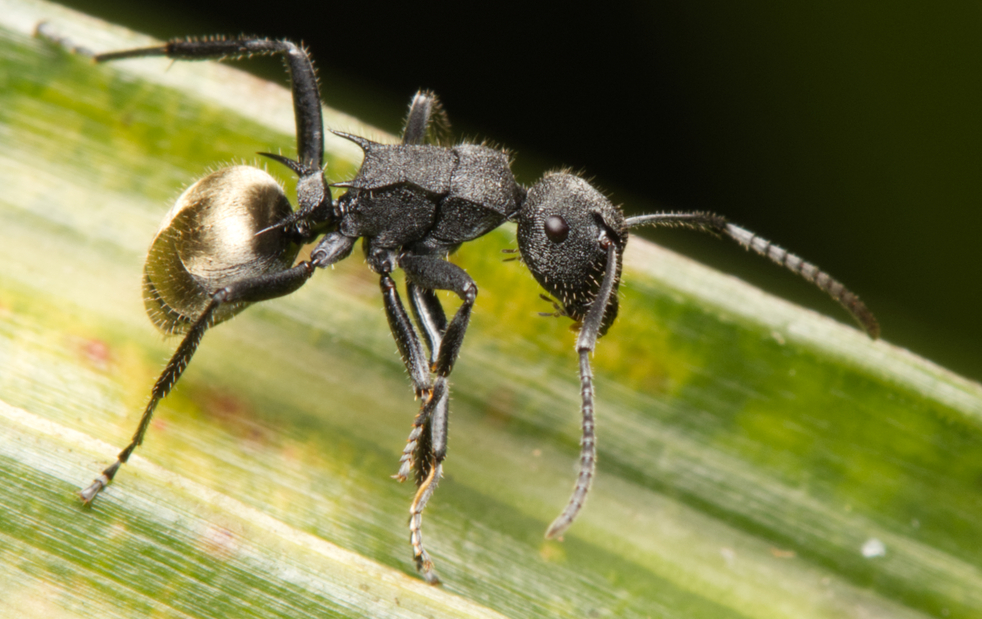
P. erato

- Polyrhachis eremita Kohout, 1990
- Polyrhachis erosispina Emery, 1900
- Polyrhachis esarata Bolton, 1973
- Polyrhachis escherichi Viehmeyer, 1914
- Polyrhachis esuriens Emery, 1897
- Polyrhachis etheli Chapman, 1963
- Polyrhachis eureka Kohout, 2013
- Polyrhachis euryala Smith, 1863
- Polyrhachis eurynota Emery, 1897
- Polyrhachis euterpe Forel, 1902
- Polyrhachis euthiacaena Zhou & Zheng, 1997
- Polyrhachis exarata Emery, 1887
- Polyrhachis excellens Viehmeyer, 1912
- Polyrhachis excisa Mayr, 1867
- Polyrhachis excitata Viehmeyer, 1913
- Polyrhachis exercita (Walker, 1859)
- Polyrhachis exotica Kohout, 1987
- Polyrhachis expressa Kohout, 2006

== F ==
- Polyrhachis feehani Kohout, 2013
- Polyrhachis fellowesi Wong & Guénard, 2020
- Polyrhachis femorata Smith, 1858

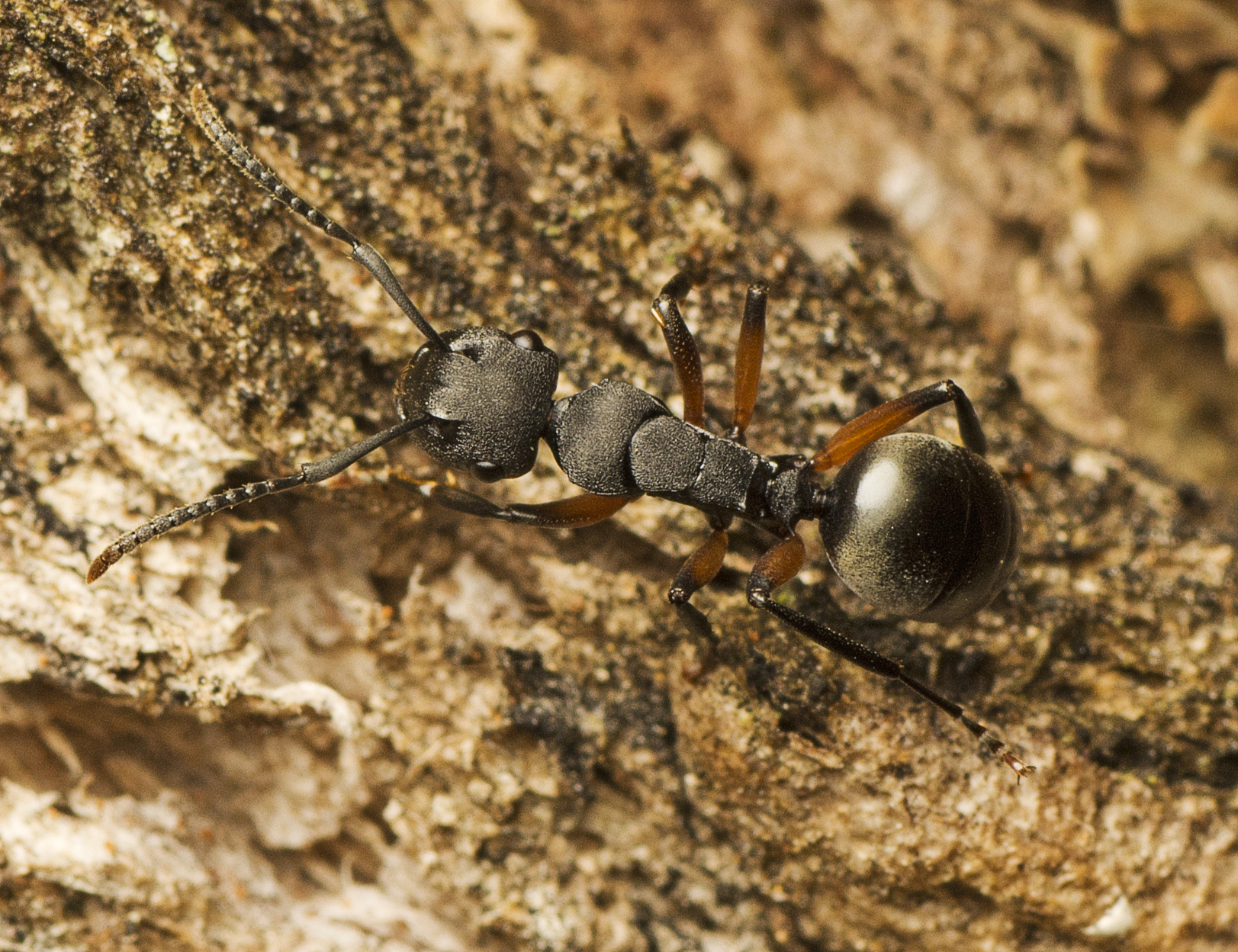
P. femorata

- Polyrhachis fervens Smith, 1860
- Polyrhachis festina Kohout, 2008
- Polyrhachis fisheri Rigato, 2016
- Polyrhachis fissa Mayr, 1902
- Polyrhachis flavibasis Clark, 1930

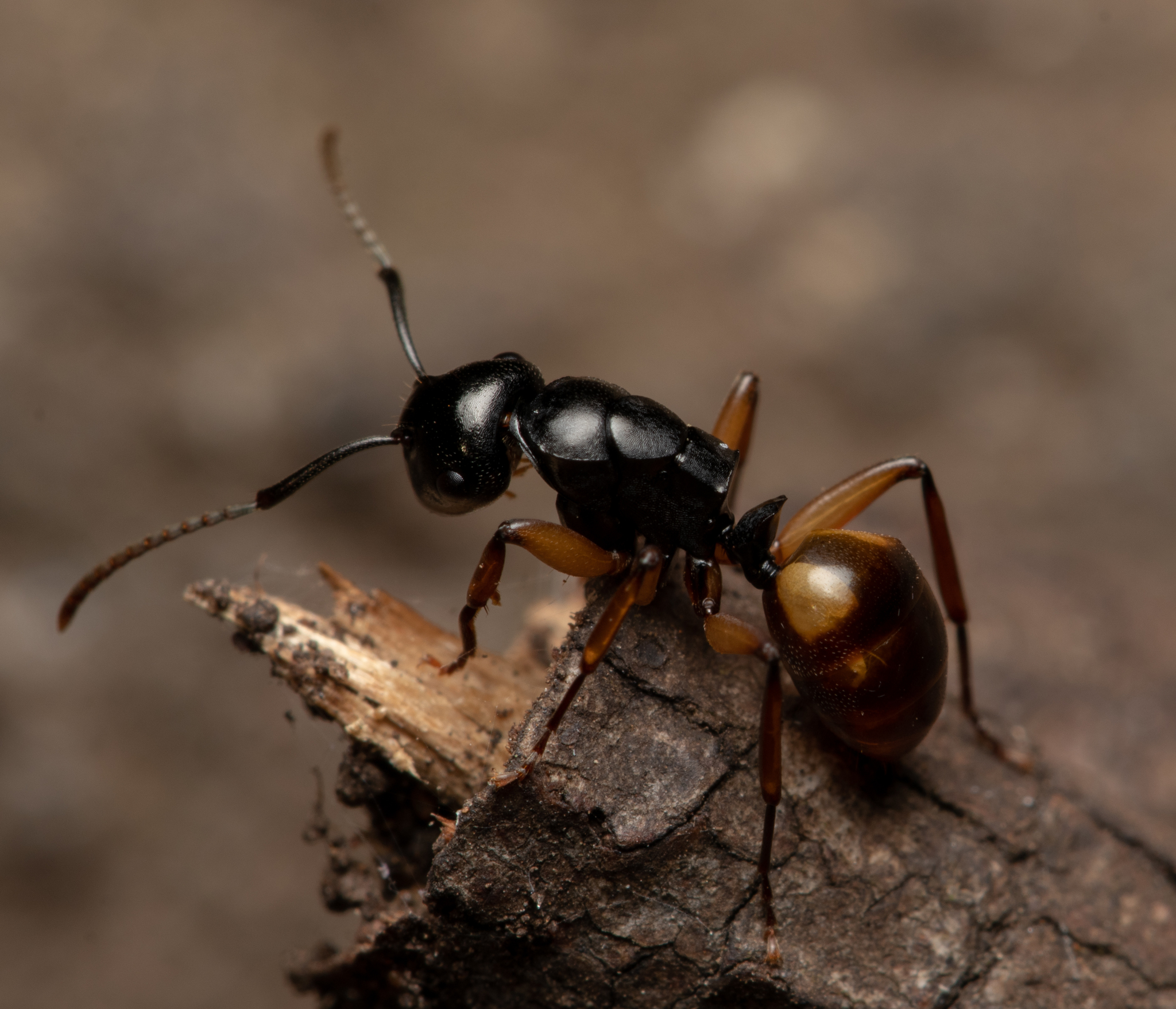
P. flavibasis

- Polyrhachis flavicornis Smith, 1857
- Polyrhachis flavoflagellata Karavaiev, 1927
- Polyrhachis follicula Menozzi, 1926
- Polyrhachis foreli Kohout, 1989

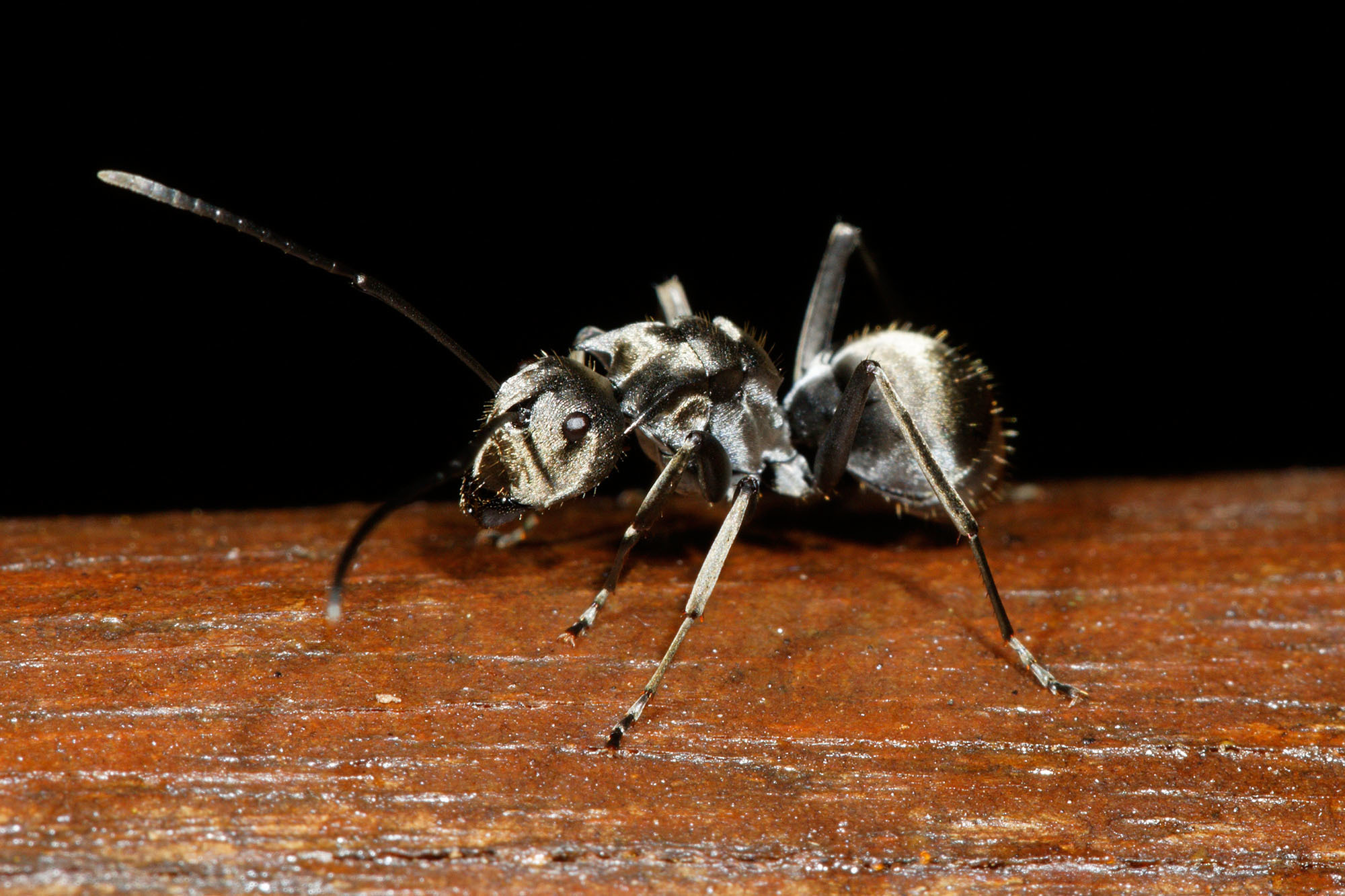
P. foreli

- Polyrhachis fornicata Emery, 1900
- Polyrhachis fortis Emery, 1893
- Polyrhachis frauenfeldi Mayr, 1862
- Polyrhachis fruhstorferi Emery, 1898

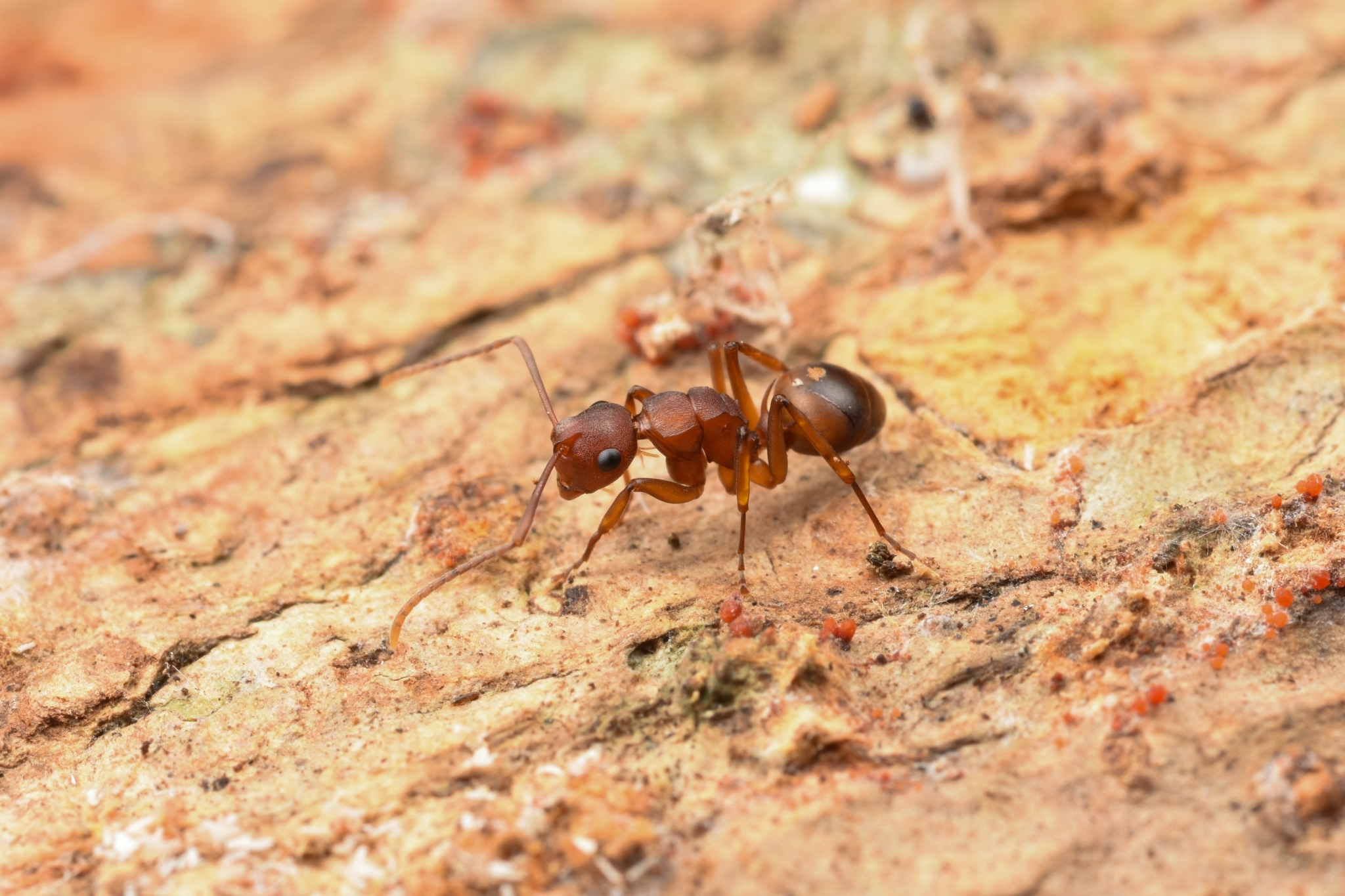
P. f. varicolor

- Polyrhachis fulakora Mann, 1919
- Polyrhachis fulgens Viehmeyer, 1912
- Polyrhachis furcata Smith, 1858
- Polyrhachis furcula Emery, 1911
- Polyrhachis fuscipes Mayr, 1862

== G ==
- Polyrhachis gab Forel, 1879
- Polyrhachis gagates Smith, 1858

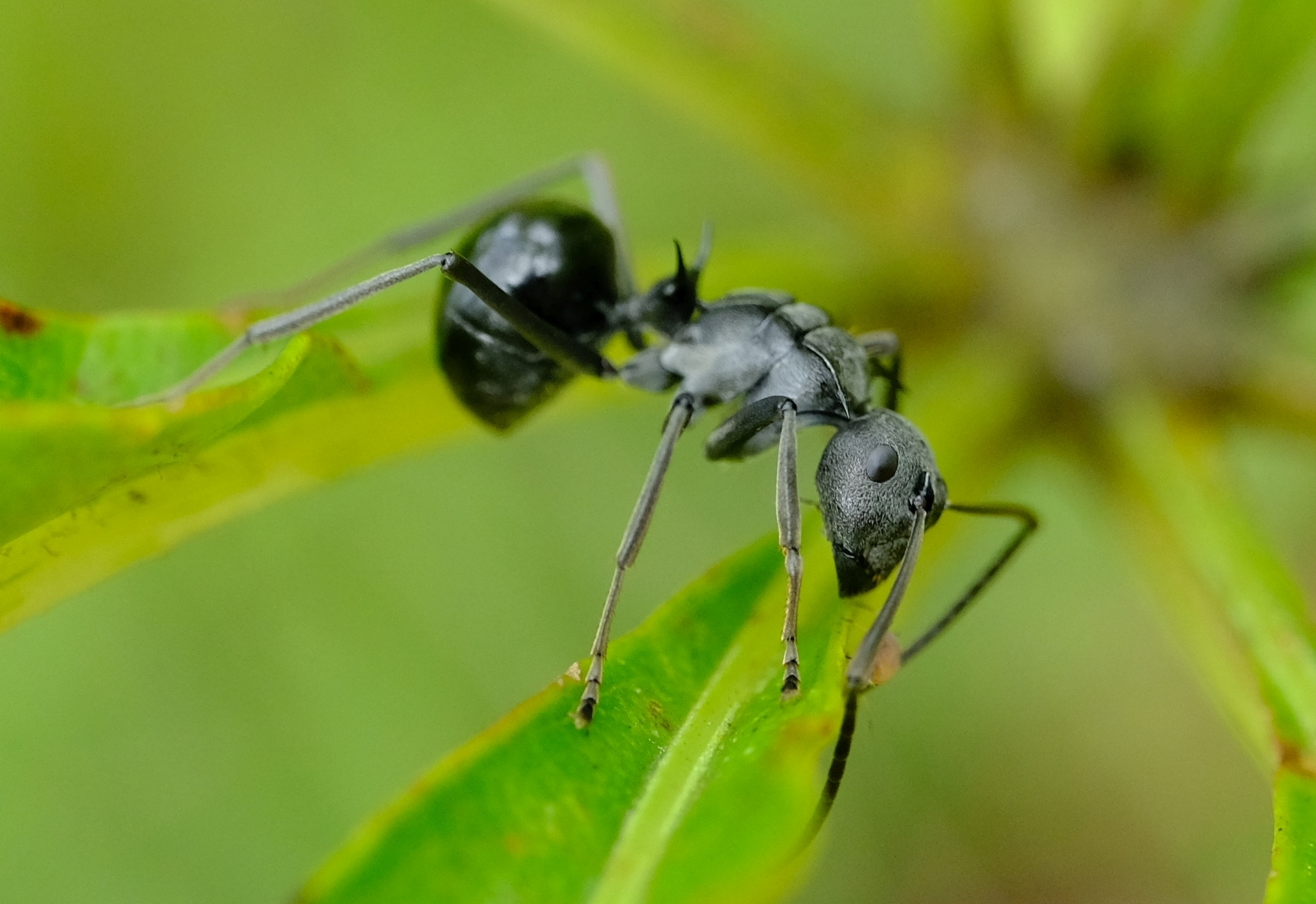
P. gagates

- Polyrhachis gamaii Santschi, 1917
- Polyrhachis garbhangaensis Sharma et al., 2026
- Polyrhachis gazelle Kohout, 2013
- Polyrhachis geminata Mann, 1919
- Polyrhachis gentilis Kohout, 2007
- Polyrhachis geometrica Smith, 1859
- Polyrhachis gerstaeckeri Forel, 1886
- Polyrhachis gestroi Emery, 1900
- Polyrhachis gibba Emery, 1901
- Polyrhachis gibbosa Forel, 1908
- Polyrhachis gibbula Rigato, 2016
- Polyrhachis glabrinota Clark, 1930
- Polyrhachis glykera Forel, 1912
- Polyrhachis gobini Kohout, 2008
- Polyrhachis goramensis Emery, 1887
- Polyrhachis gracilior Forel, 1893
- Polyrhachis grandis Donisthorpe, 1949
- Polyrhachis gravis Clark, 1930
- Polyrhachis greensladei Kohout, 1990
- Polyrhachis gressitti Kohout, 2007
- Polyrhachis gribodoi Emery, 1887
- Polyrhachis grisescens Emery, 1895
- Polyrhachis guerini Roger, 1863

== H ==
- Polyrhachis halidayi Emery, 1889
- Polyrhachis hashimotoi Kohout, 2007
- Polyrhachis hastata (Latreille, 1802)
- Polyrhachis hauxwelli Bingham, 1903
- Polyrhachis hector Smith, 1857
- Polyrhachis heinlethii Forel, 1895
- Polyrhachis hemiopticoides Mukerjee, 1930
- Polyrhachis hera Forel, 1911
- Polyrhachis hermione Emery, 1895
- Polyrhachis hespera Kohout, 2013
- Polyrhachis hexacantha (Erichson, 1842)
- Polyrhachis hilaris Kohout, 2008
- Polyrhachis hippomanes Smith, 1861
- Polyrhachis hirsuta Mayr, 1876

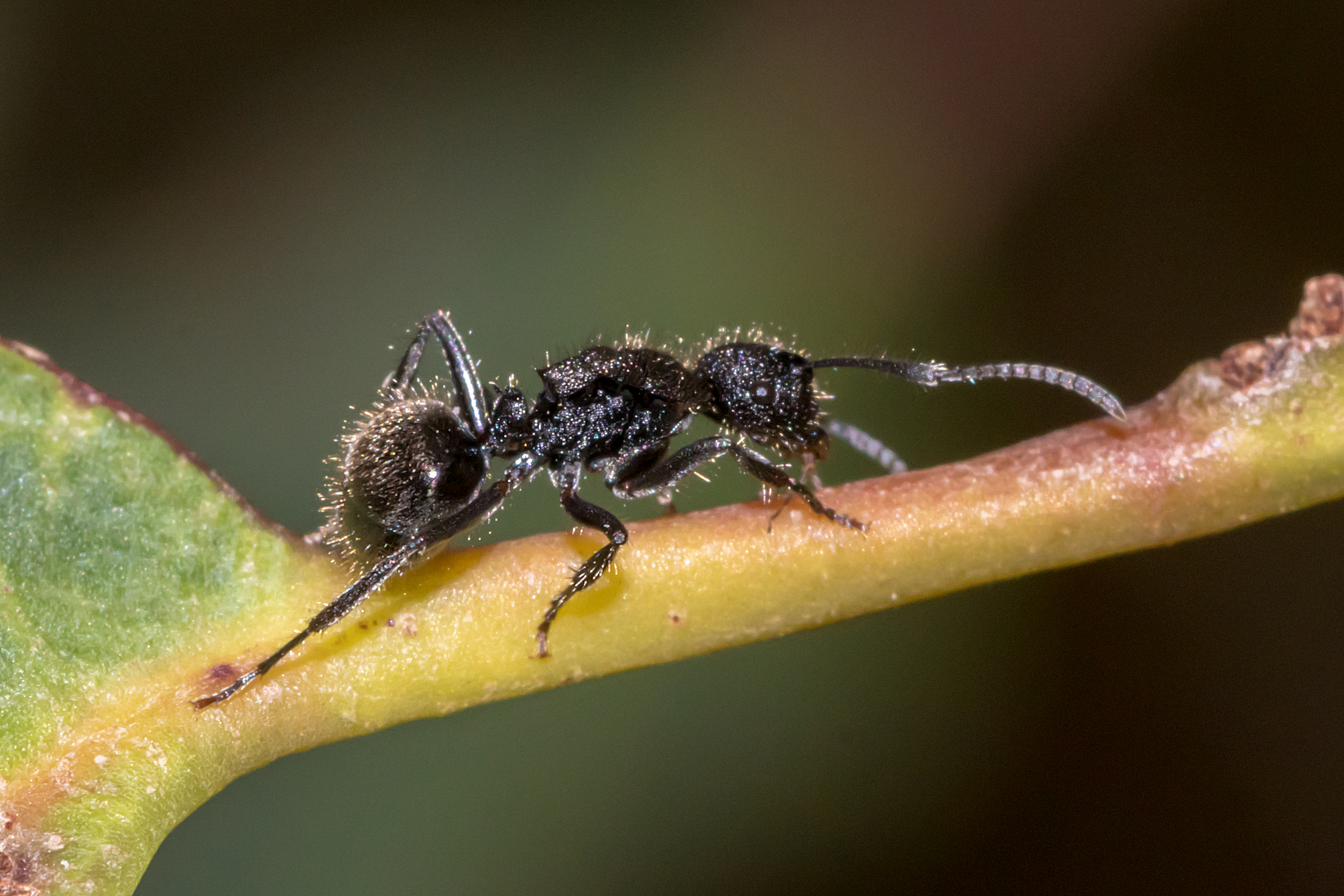
P. hirsuta

- Polyrhachis hirta Viehmeyer, 1914
- Polyrhachis hispida Kohout, 2008
- Polyrhachis hodgsoni Forel, 1902
- Polyrhachis hoelldobleri Kohout, 2006
- Polyrhachis hoffmanni Kohout, 2013
- Polyrhachis hookeri Lowne, 1865

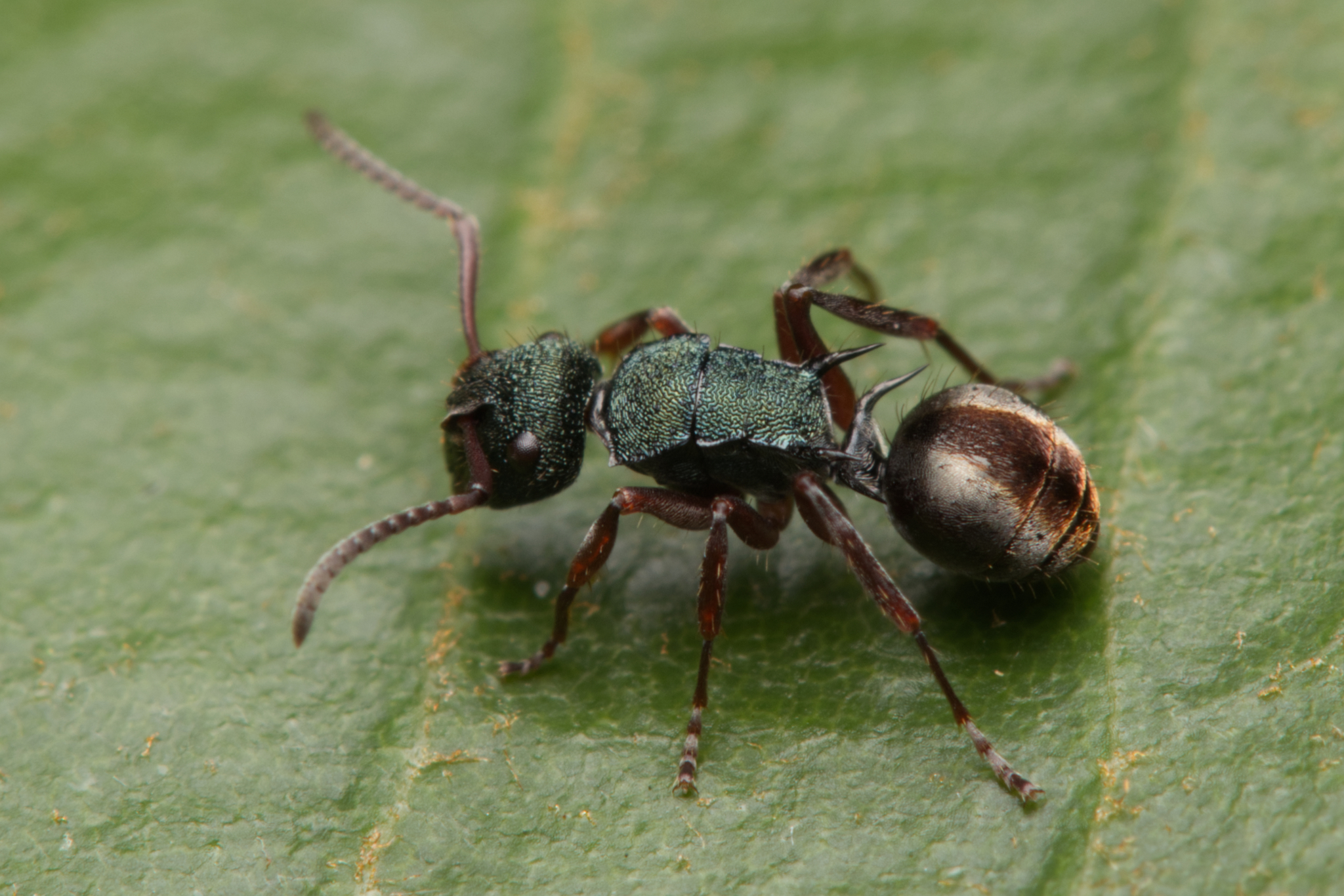
P. hookeri

- Polyrhachis horacei Hung, 1967
- Polyrhachis horni Emery, 1901
- Polyrhachis hosei Donisthorpe, 1942
- Polyrhachis hortensis Forel, 1913
- Polyrhachis hostilis Smith, 1859
- Polyrhachis hunggeuk Wong & Guénard, 2020
- Polyrhachis hungi Emery, 1901
- Polyrhachis hybosa Kohout, 2006

== I ==
- Polyrhachis ignota Kohout, 1987
- Polyrhachis illaudata Walker, 1859
- Polyrhachis imitator Kohout, 2008
- Polyrhachis impressa Kohout, 2007
- Polyrhachis incerta Kohout, 2008
- Polyrhachis inclusa Viehmeyer, 1912
- Polyrhachis incognita Kohout, 2008
- Polyrhachis inconspicua Emery, 1887
- Polyrhachis inducta Kohout, 2006
- Polyrhachis inermis Smith, 1858
- Polyrhachis inflata Kohout, 2006
- Polyrhachis injinooi Kohout, 2013
- Polyrhachis insularis Emery, 1887
- Polyrhachis integra Kohout, 2006
- Polyrhachis inusitata Kohout, 1989
- Polyrhachis io Forel, 1915
- Polyrhachis isacantha Emery, 1887
- Polyrhachis isolata Kohout, 2013
- Polyrhachis ithona Smith, 1860

== J ==
- Polyrhachis jacksoniana Roger, 1863
- Polyrhachis jacobsoni Forel, 1909
- Polyrhachis javanica Mayr, 1867
- Polyrhachis jerdonii Forel, 1892
- Polyrhachis jianghuaensis Wang & Wu, 1991
- Polyrhachis johnsoni Mann, 1919
- Polyrhachis jurii Karavaiev, 1935

== K ==
- Polyrhachis kaipi Mann, 1919
- Polyrhachis kazuoi Kohout, 2008
- Polyrhachis kebunraya Kohout, 2013
- Polyrhachis keratifera Karavaiev, 1927
- Polyrhachis khepra Bolton, 1973
- Polyrhachis kohli Forel, 1916
- Polyrhachis kohouti Hoffmann, 2015
- Polyrhachis kokoda Kohout, 2007
- Polyrhachis kubani Zettel & Ockermüller, 2023
- Polyrhachis kyawthani Kohout, 2006

== L ==
- Polyrhachis labella Smith, 1860
- Polyrhachis laboriosa Smith, 1858

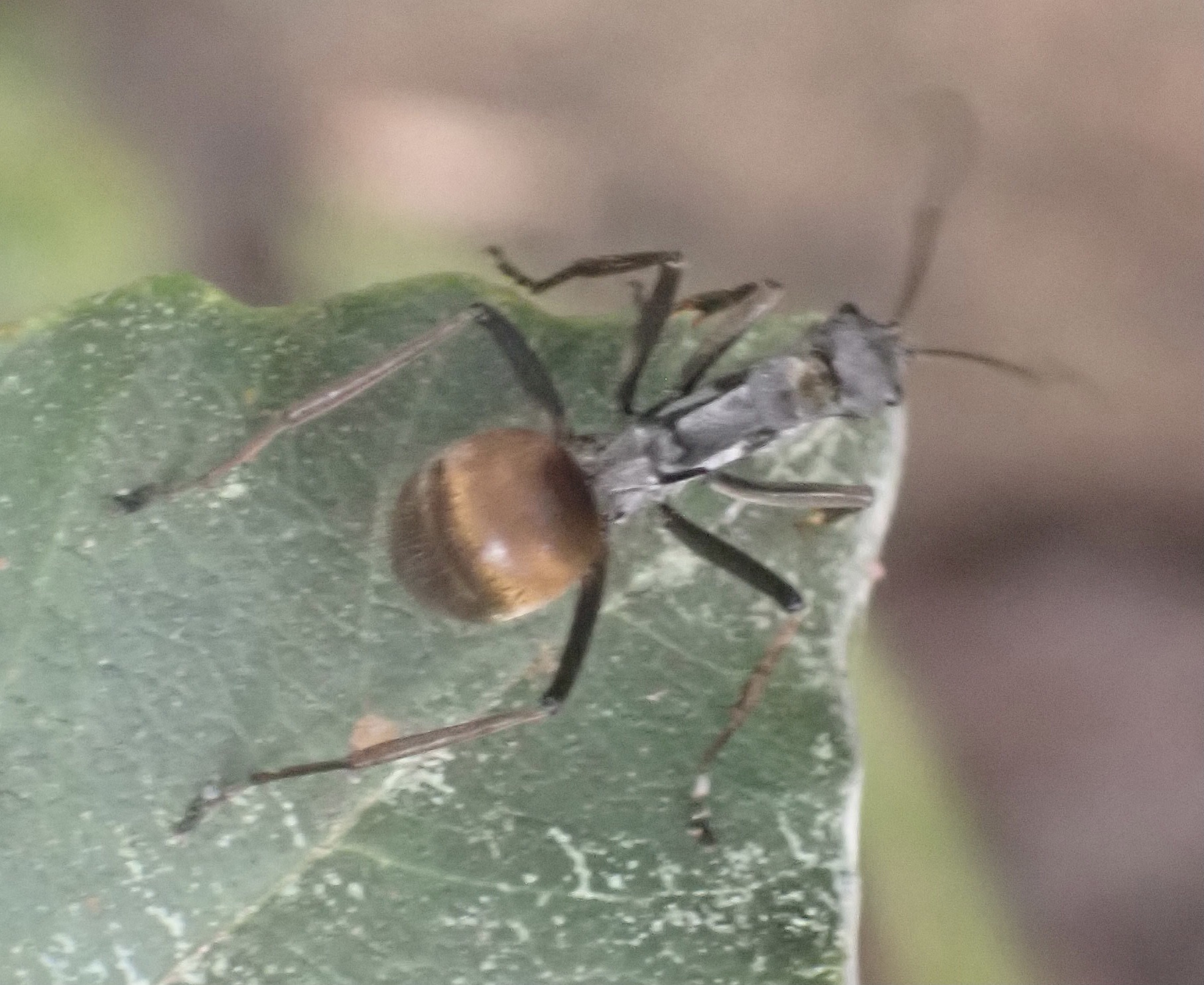
P. laboriosa

- Polyrhachis lachesis Forel, 1897
- Polyrhachis laciniata Emery, 1900
- Polyrhachis lacroixi Zettel, 2019
- Polyrhachis lacteipennis Smith, 1858
- Polyrhachis laevigata Smith, 1857
- Polyrhachis laevissima Smith, 1858

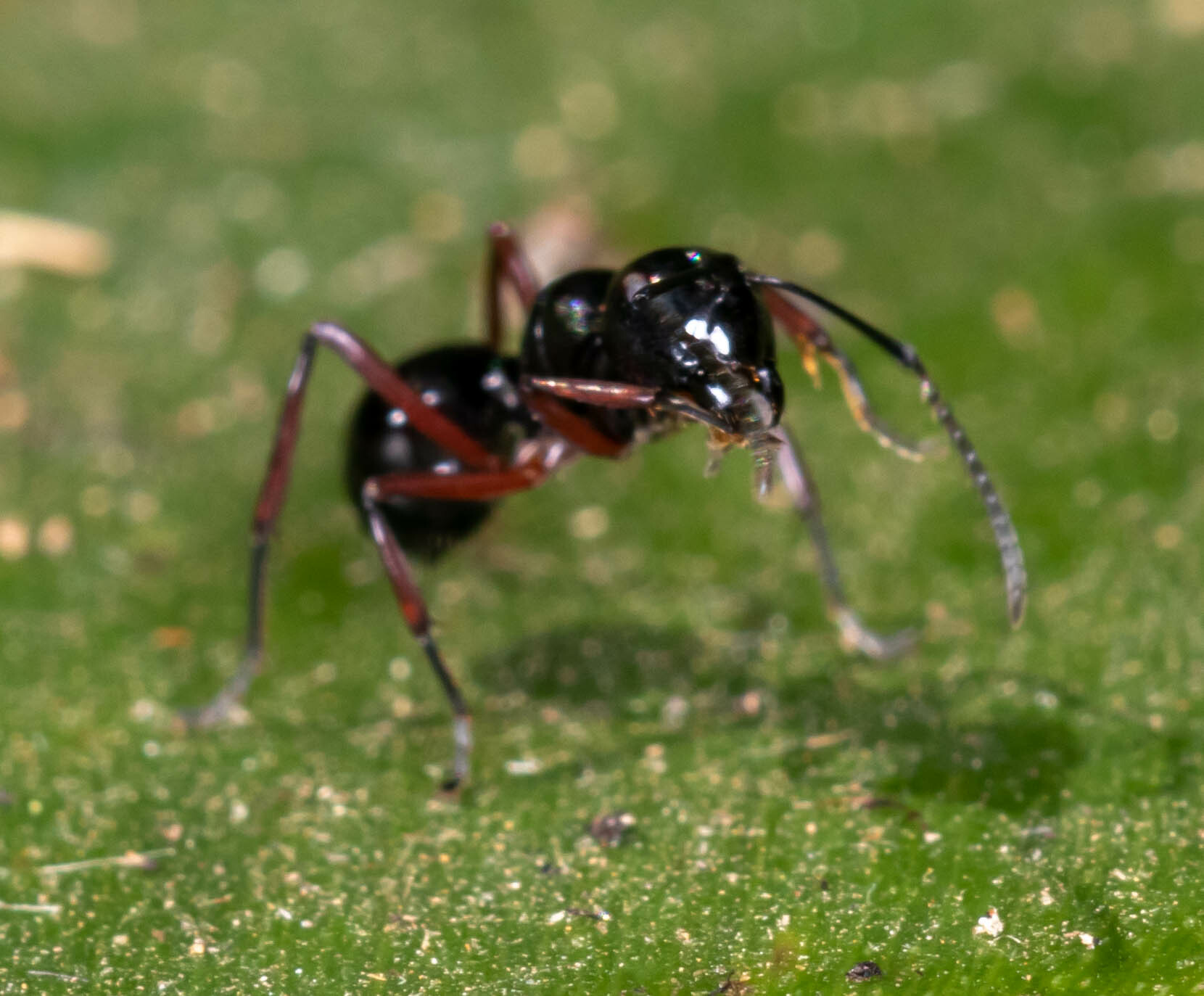
P. laevissima

- Polyrhachis lama Kohout, 1994
- Polyrhachis lamellidens Smith, 1874
- Polyrhachis laminata Mayr, 1867
- Polyrhachis lanuginosa Santschi, 1910
- Polyrhachis lao Jaitrong & Yamane, 2023
- Polyrhachis lata Emery, 1895
- Polyrhachis latharis Bolton, 1973
- Polyrhachis latinota Viehmeyer, 1912
- Polyrhachis latispina Emery, 1925
- Polyrhachis latona Wheeler, 1909
- Polyrhachis lauta Santschi, 1910
- Polyrhachis leae Forel, 1913

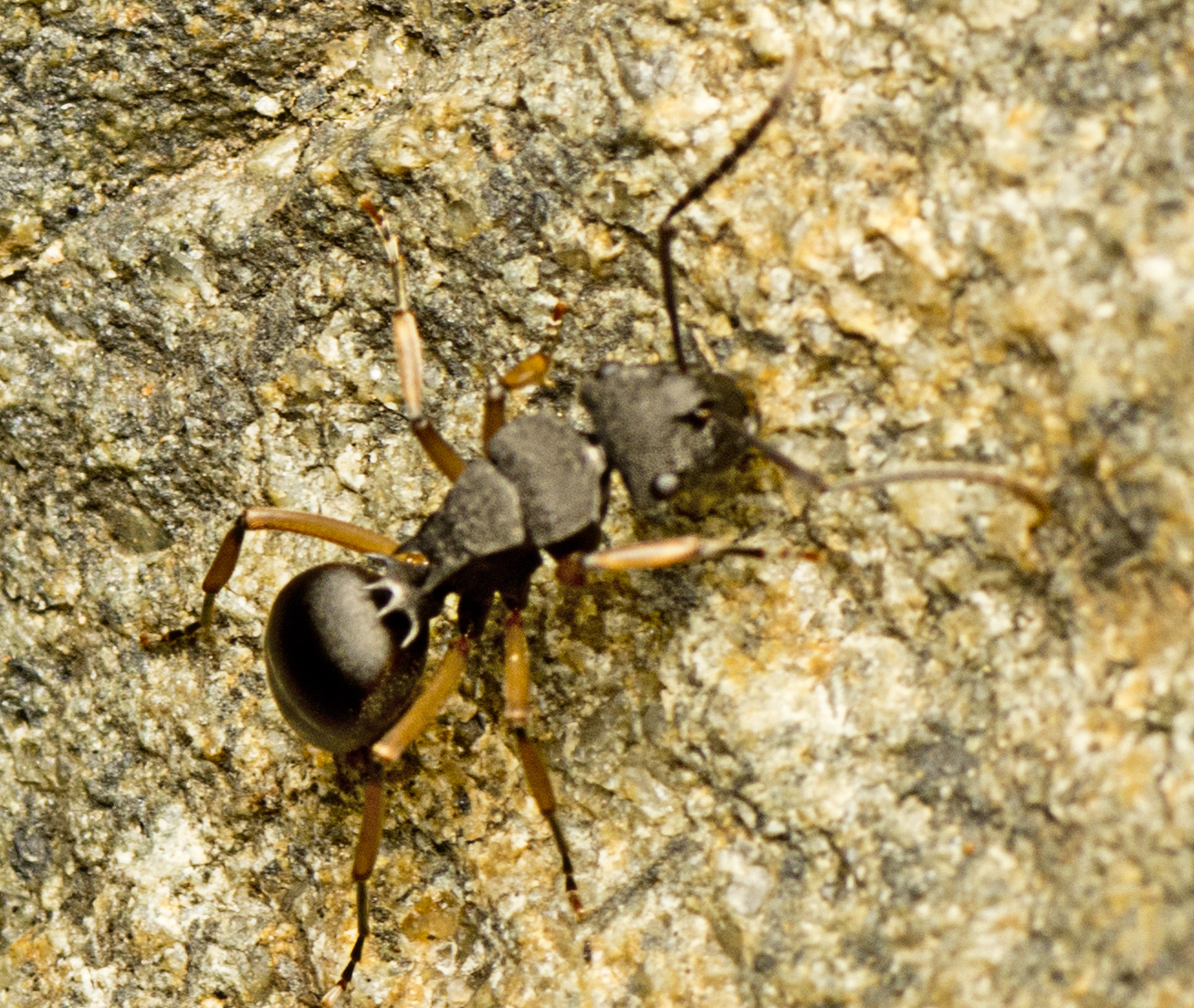
P. leae

- Polyrhachis leonidas Forel, 1901
- Polyrhachis leopoldi Santschi, 1932
- Polyrhachis lepida Kohout, 2006
- Polyrhachis lestoni Bolton, 1973
- Polyrhachis levior Roger, 1863
- Polyrhachis leviuscula Viehmeyer, 1916
- Polyrhachis lilianae Forel, 1911
- Polyrhachis limbata Emery, 1897

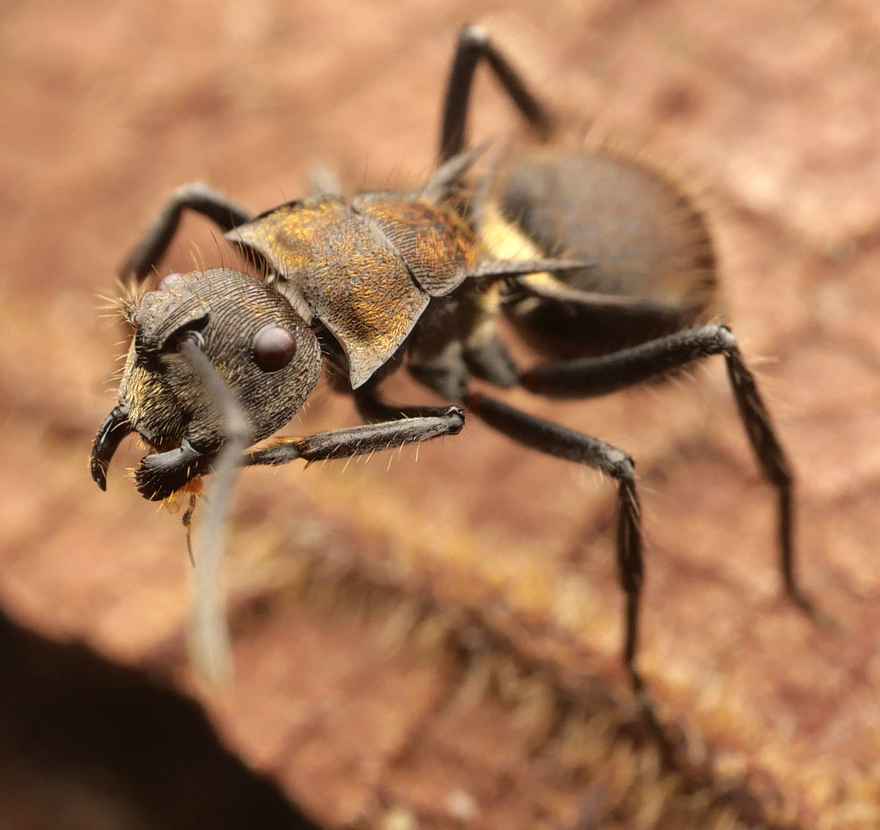
P. limbata

- Polyrhachis limitis Santschi, 1939
- Polyrhachis linae Donisthorpe, 1938
- Polyrhachis litigiosa Emery, 1897
- Polyrhachis lombokensis Emery, 1898
- Polyrhachis longipes Smith, 1859
- Polyrhachis longiseta Rigato, 2016
- Polyrhachis loriai Emery, 1897
- Polyrhachis loweryi Kohout, 1990
- Polyrhachis lownei Forel, 1895
- Polyrhachis lucidula Emery, 1893
- Polyrhachis luctuosa Emery, 1921
- Polyrhachis lugens Mayr, 1867
- Polyrhachis lumi Kohout, 2007
- Polyrhachis luteipes Rigato, 2016
- Polyrhachis luteogaster Kohout, 2012
- Polyrhachis lydiae Forel, 1902

== M ==
- Polyrhachis maai Kohout, 2007
- Polyrhachis machaon Santschi, 1920

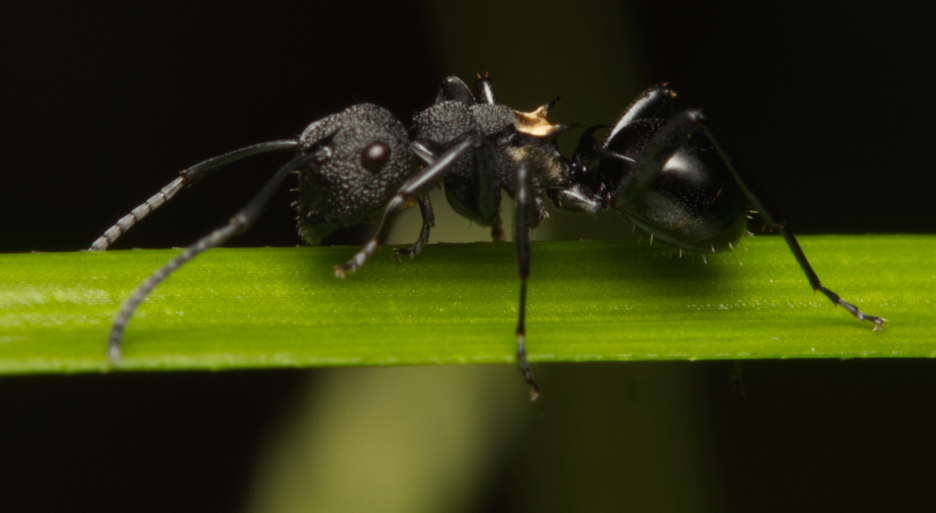
P. machaon

- Polyrhachis mackayi Donisthorpe, 1938

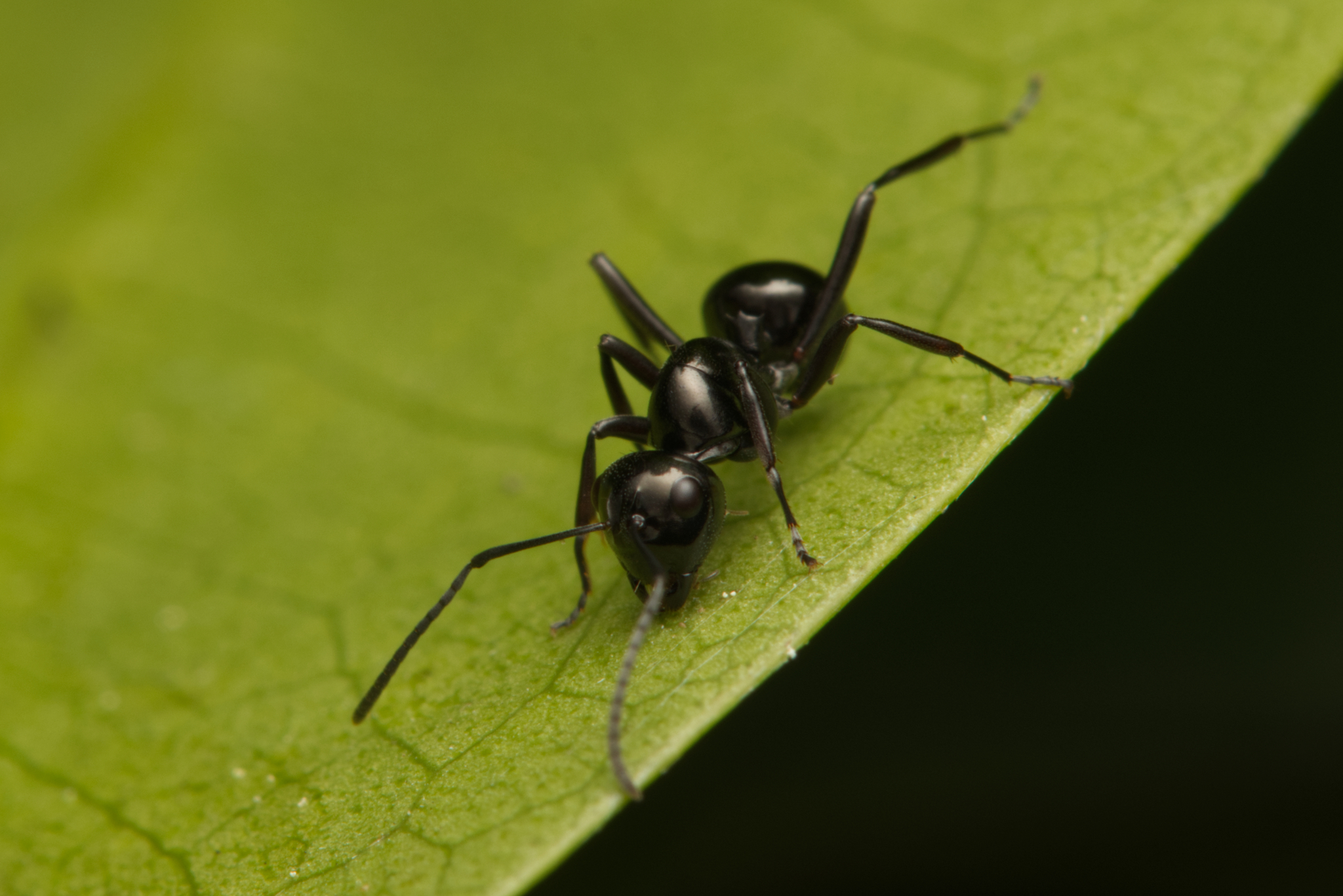
P. mackayi

- Polyrhachis macropus Wheeler, 1916
- Polyrhachis maculata Forel, 1915

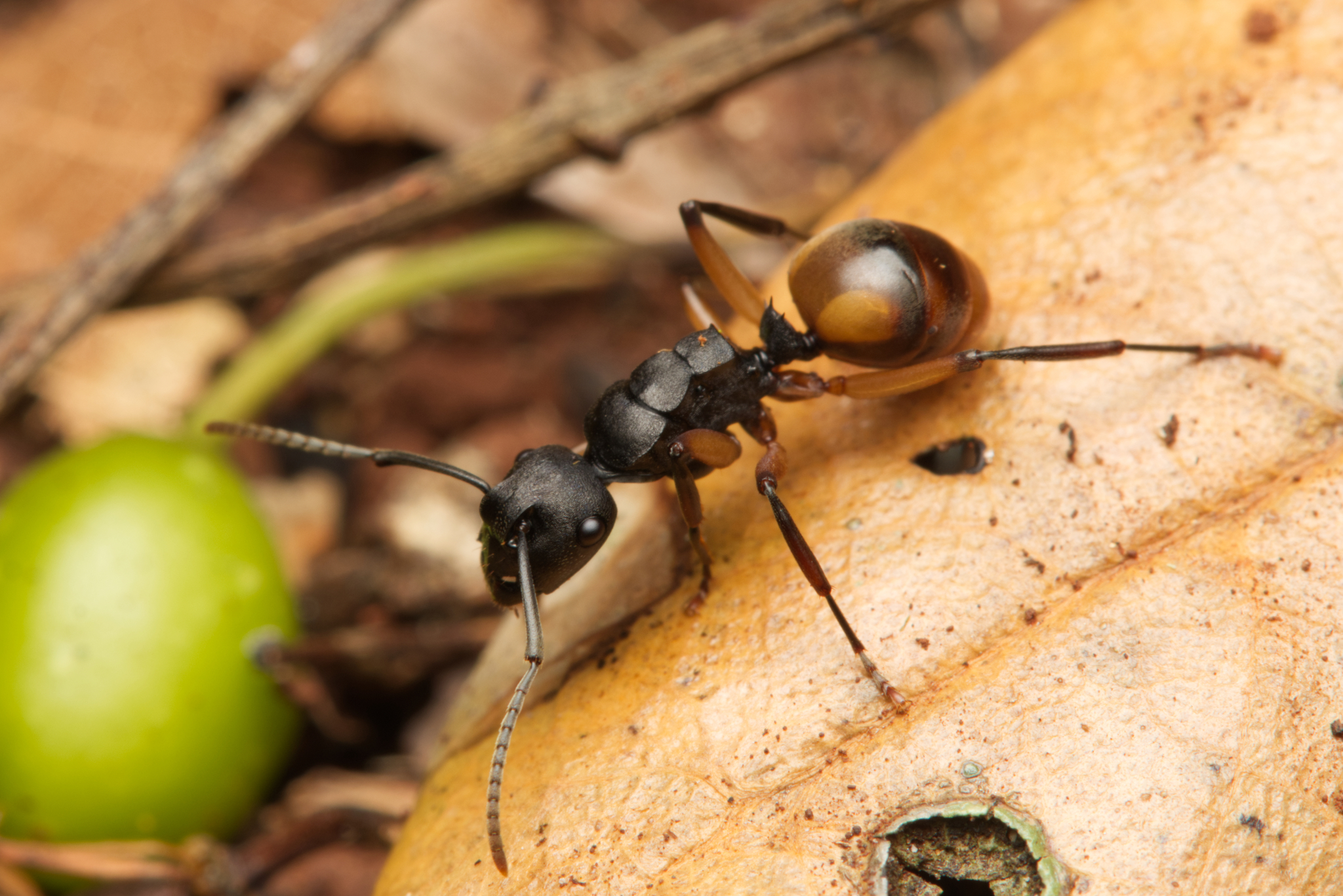
P. maculata

- Polyrhachis magnifica Menozzi, 1926
- Polyrhachis malaensis Mann, 1919
- Polyrhachis maliau Kohout, 2014
- Polyrhachis mamba Kohout, 2007
- Polyrhachis manni Kohout, 2008
- Polyrhachis manusensis Kohout, 2013
- Polyrhachis marginata Smith, 1859
- Polyrhachis maryatiae Kohout, 2007
- Polyrhachis masaokai Kohout, 2008
- Polyrhachis medusa Forel, 1897

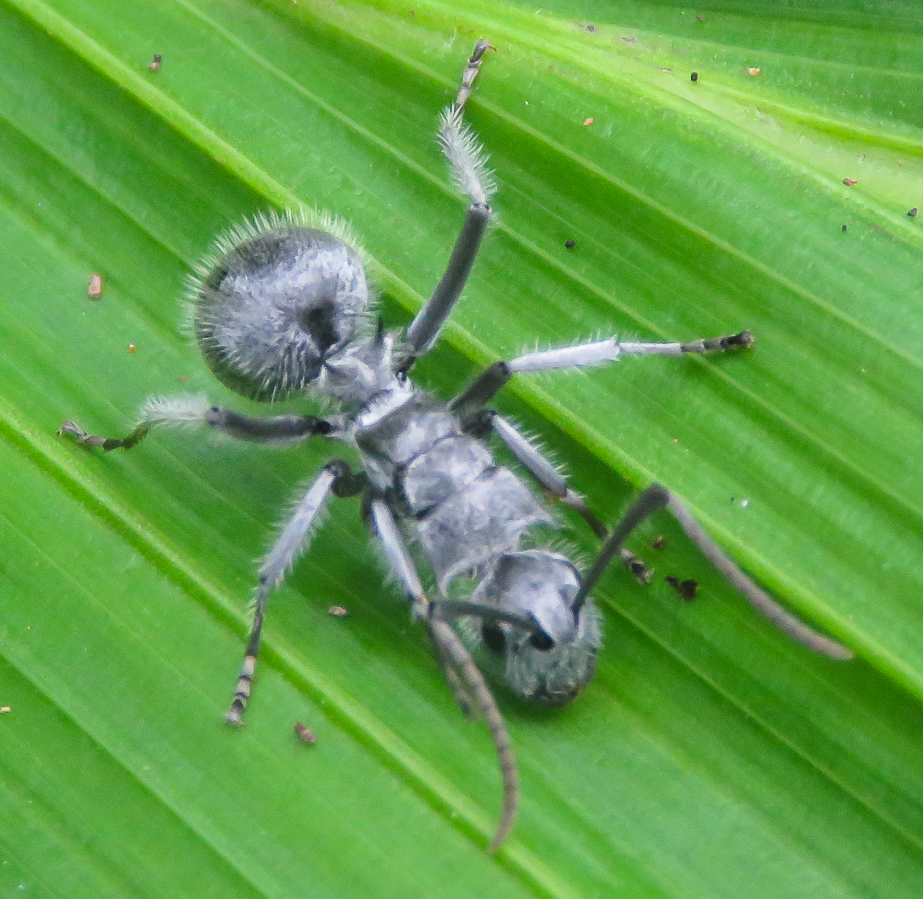
P. medusa

- Polyrhachis melanura Kohout, 2013
- Polyrhachis mellita Kohout, 2008
- Polyrhachis melpomene Emery, 1897
- Polyrhachis menelas Forel, 1904
- Polyrhachis menozzii Karavaiev, 1927
- Polyrhachis mentor Forel, 1901
- Polyrhachis metella Smith, 1860

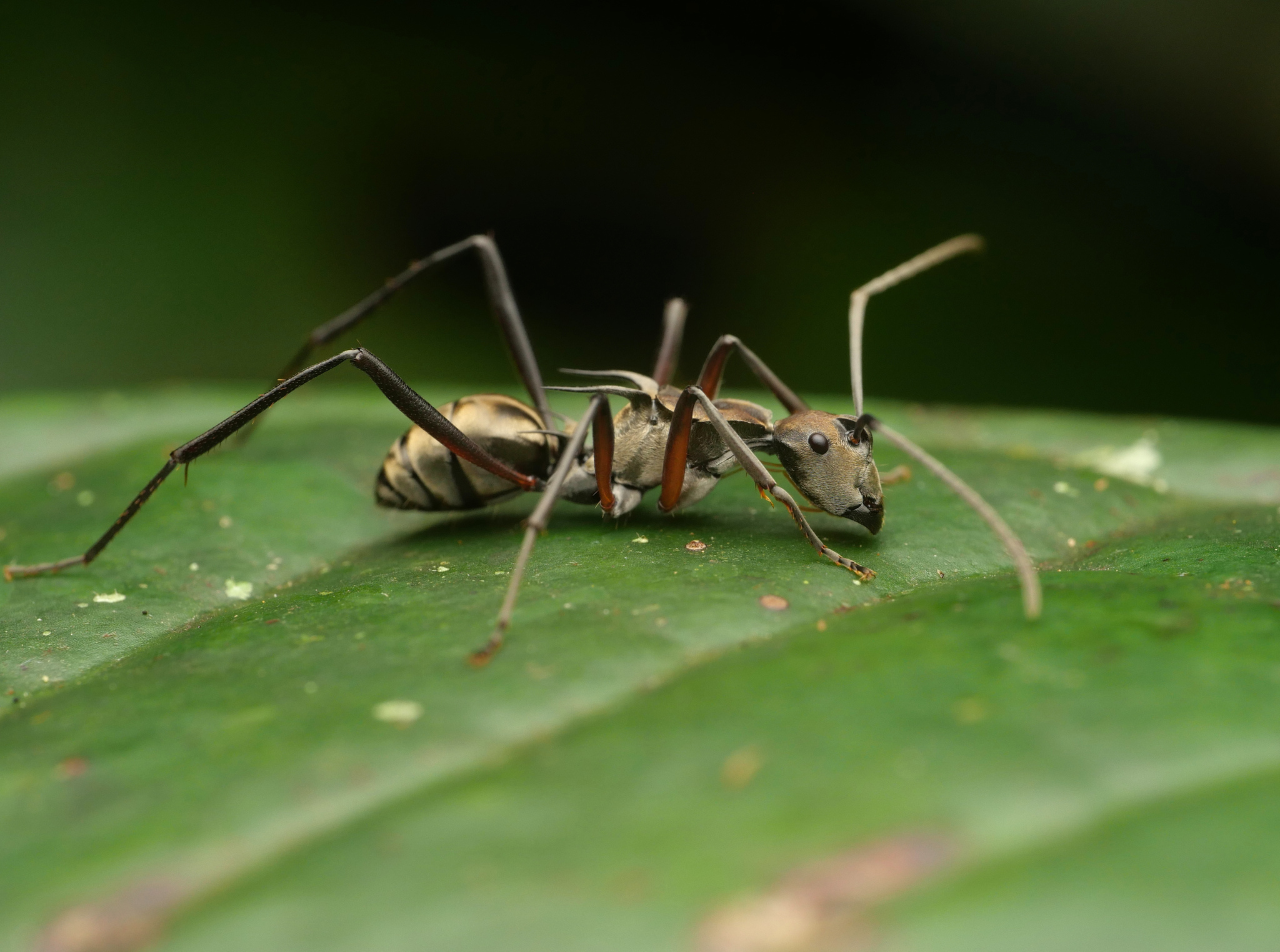
P. metella

- Polyrhachis micans Mayr, 1876
- Polyrhachis militaris Fabricius, 1782

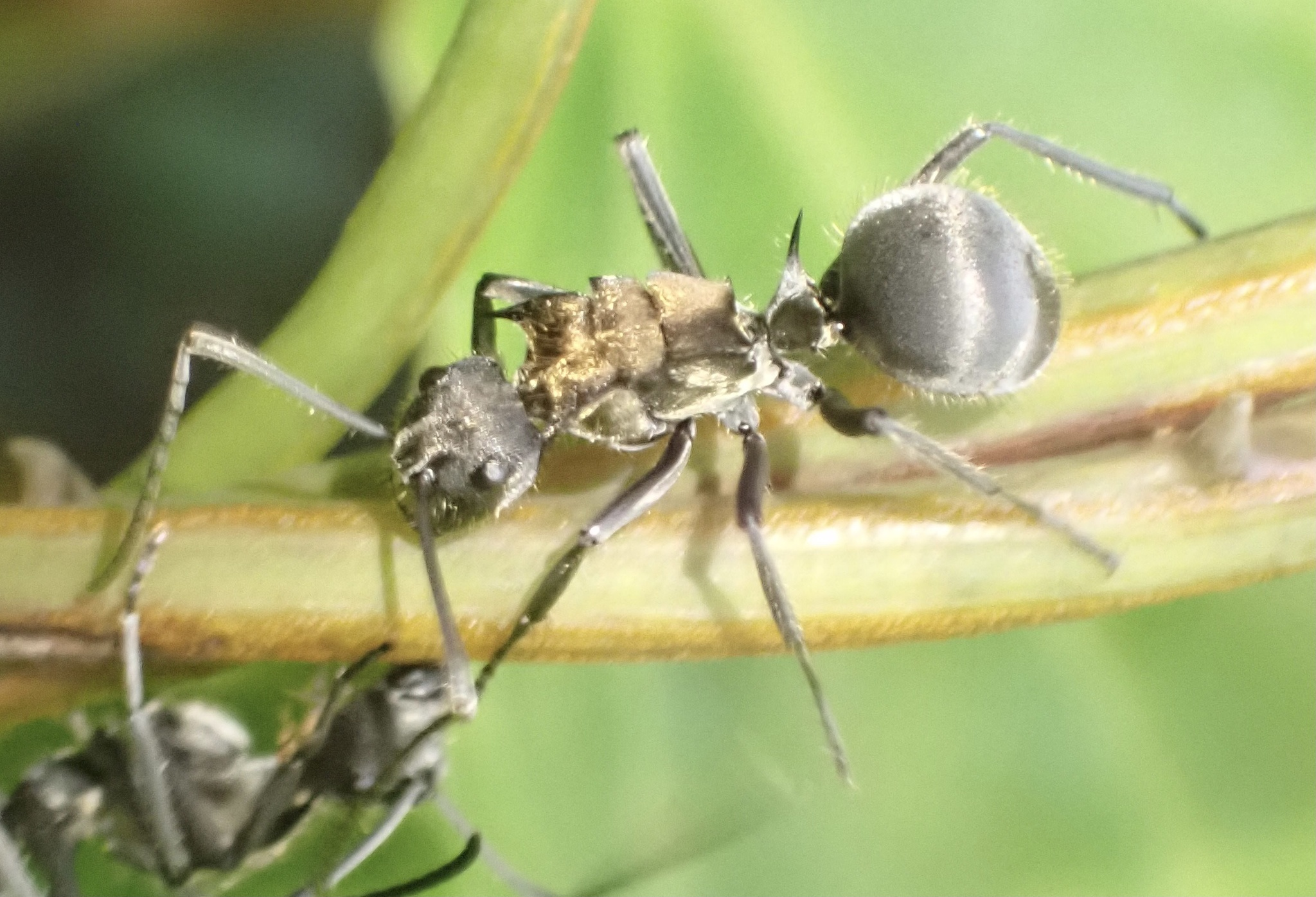
P. militaris

- Polyrhachis mindanaensis Emery, 1923
- Polyrhachis minima Kohout, 2007
- Polyrhachis mitrata Menozzi, 1932
- Polyrhachis mjobergi Forel, 1915

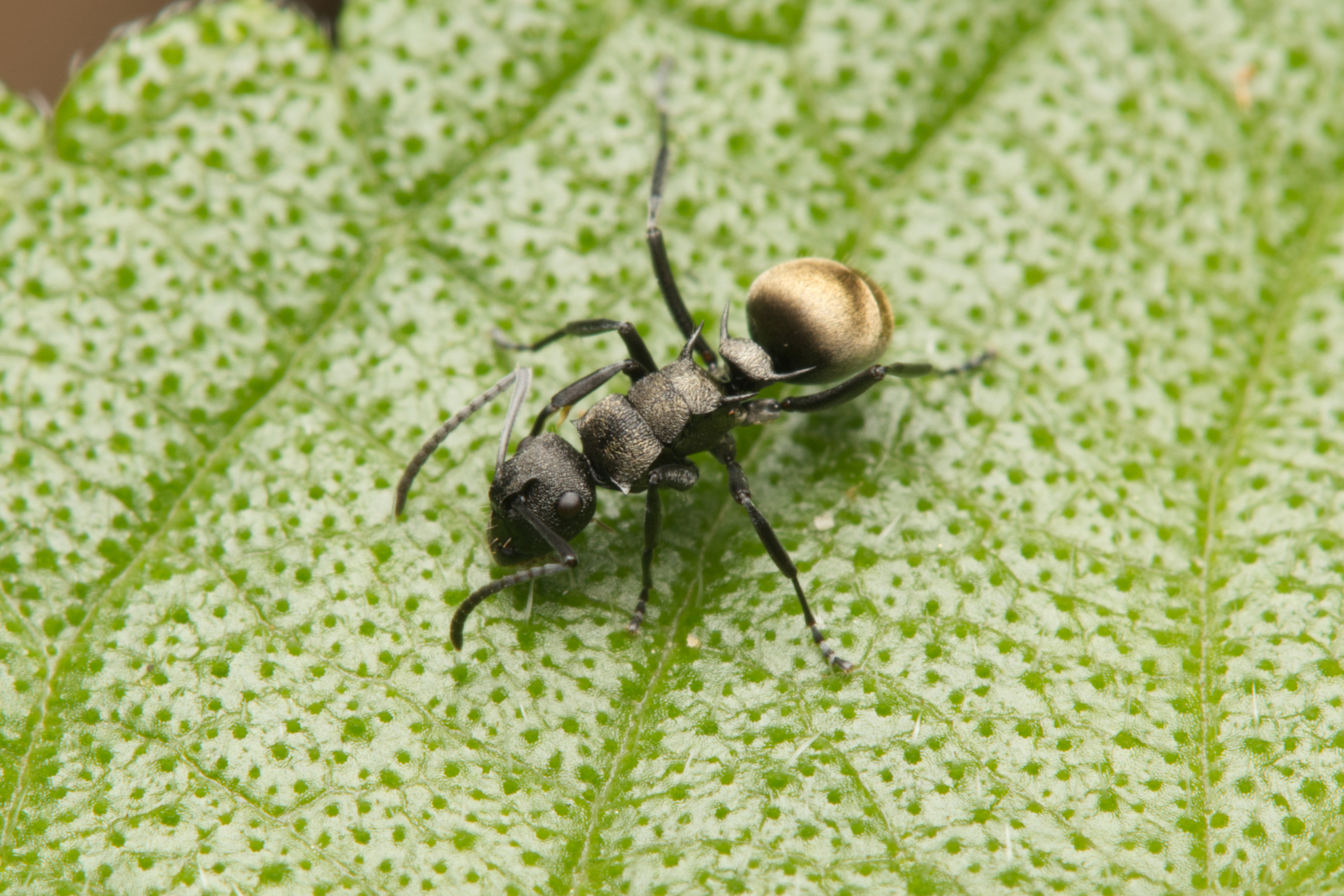
P. mjobergi

- Polyrhachis mkomaziae Taylor & McGavin, 2020
- Polyrhachis modesta Smith, 1857
- Polyrhachis moeschi Forel, 1912
- Polyrhachis moesta Emery, 1887

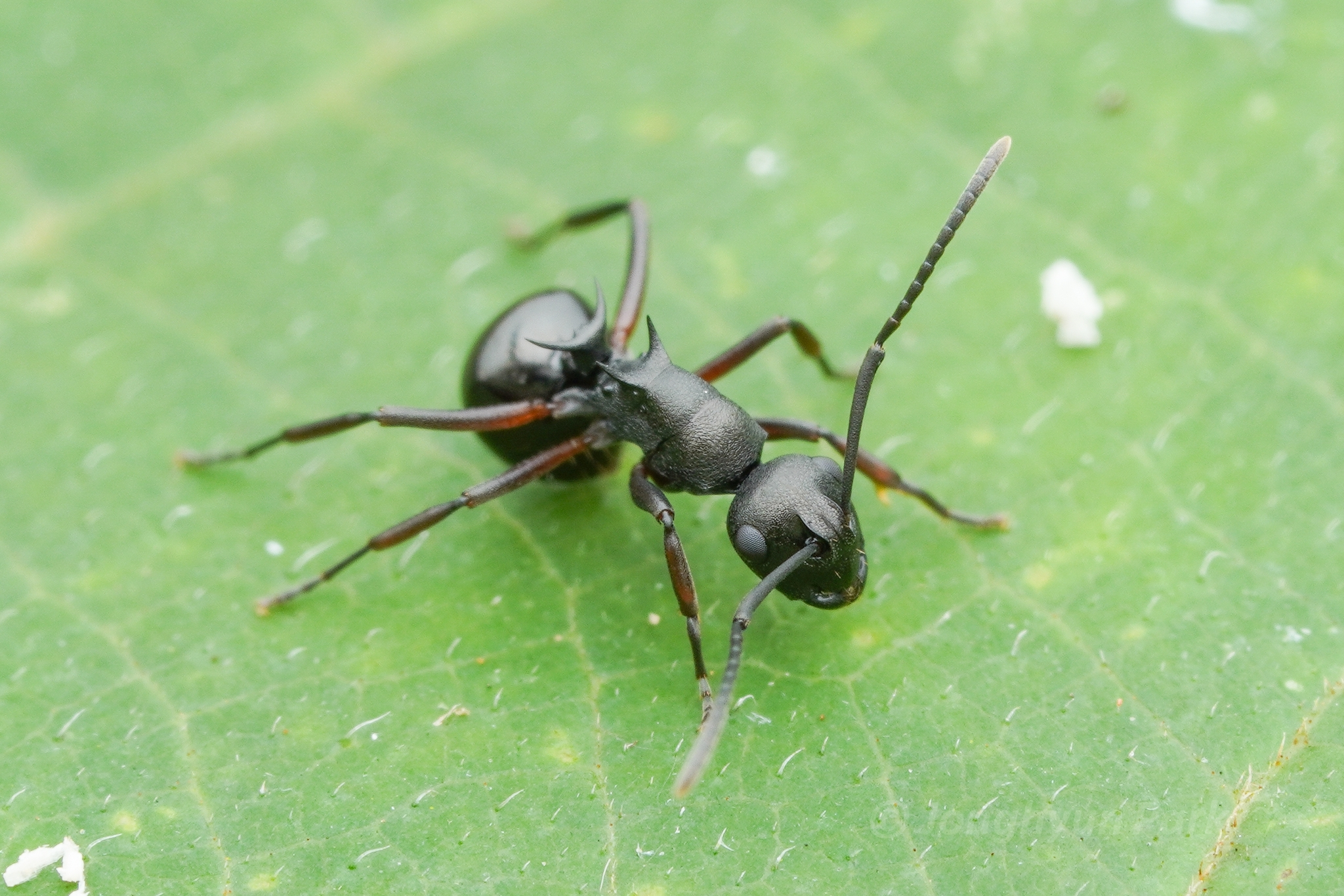
P. moesta

- Polyrhachis mondoi Donisthorpe, 1938
- Polyrhachis monista Santschi, 1910
- Polyrhachis montana Hung, 1970
- Polyrhachis monteithi Kohout, 2006

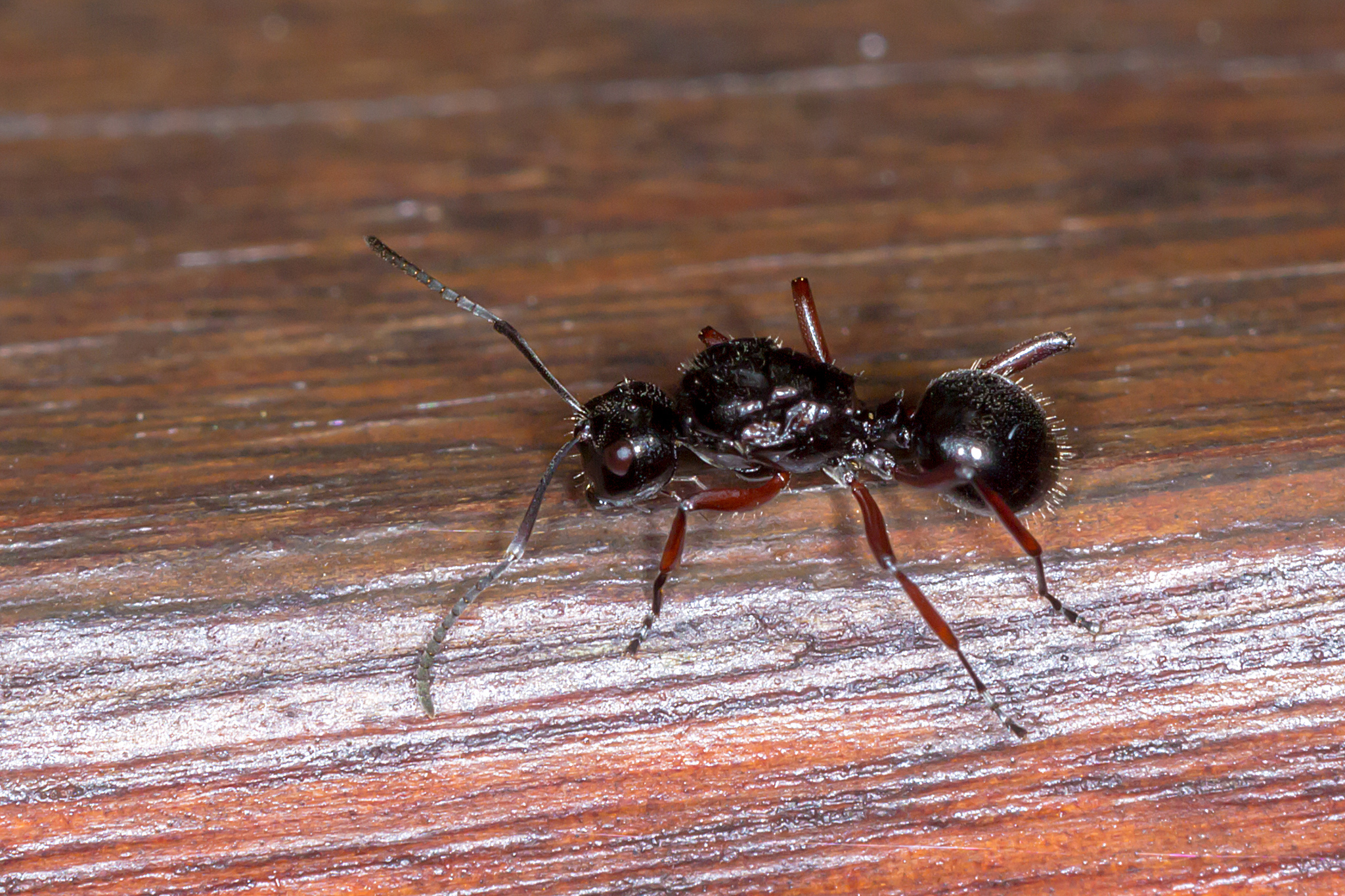
P. monteithi

- Polyrhachis monticola Kohout, 2007
- Polyrhachis muara Kohout, 2008
- Polyrhachis mucronata Smith, 1859
- Polyrhachis muelleri Forel, 1893
- Polyrhachis murina Emery, 1893
- Polyrhachis mutata Smith, 1858

== N ==
- Polyrhachis narendrani Karmaly, 2004
- Polyrhachis neglecta Kohout, 2008
- Polyrhachis nepenthicola Kohout, 2013
- Polyrhachis neptunus Smith, 1865
- Polyrhachis neuguinensis Kohout, 2013
- Polyrhachis nidificans (Jerdon, 1851)
- Polyrhachis nigra Mayr, 1862
- Polyrhachis nigrescens Karavaiev, 1927
- Polyrhachis nigriceps Smith, 1863
- Polyrhachis nigripes Emery, 1897
- Polyrhachis nigrita Mayr, 1895
- Polyrhachis nigropilosa Mayr, 1872
- Polyrhachis nitens Donisthorpe, 1943
- Polyrhachis nitida Smith, 1857
- Polyrhachis noesaensis Forel, 1915
- Polyrhachis nofra Bolton, 1975
- Polyrhachis nomo Donisthorpe, 1941
- Polyrhachis noonananti Kohout, 2013
- Polyrhachis nourlangie Kohout, 2013
- Polyrhachis nudata Smith, 1860
- Polyrhachis numeria Smith, 1861

== O ==
- Polyrhachis obesior Viehmeyer, 1916
- Polyrhachis obliqua Stitz, 1911
- Polyrhachis obscura Forel, 1895
- Polyrhachis obtusa Emery, 1897
- Polyrhachis ochracea Karavaiev, 1927
- Polyrhachis oedacantha Wheeler, 1919
- Polyrhachis oedipus Forel, 1893
- Polyrhachis ogatai Kohout, 2008
- Polyrhachis olena Smith, 1861
- Polyrhachis olybria Forel, 1912

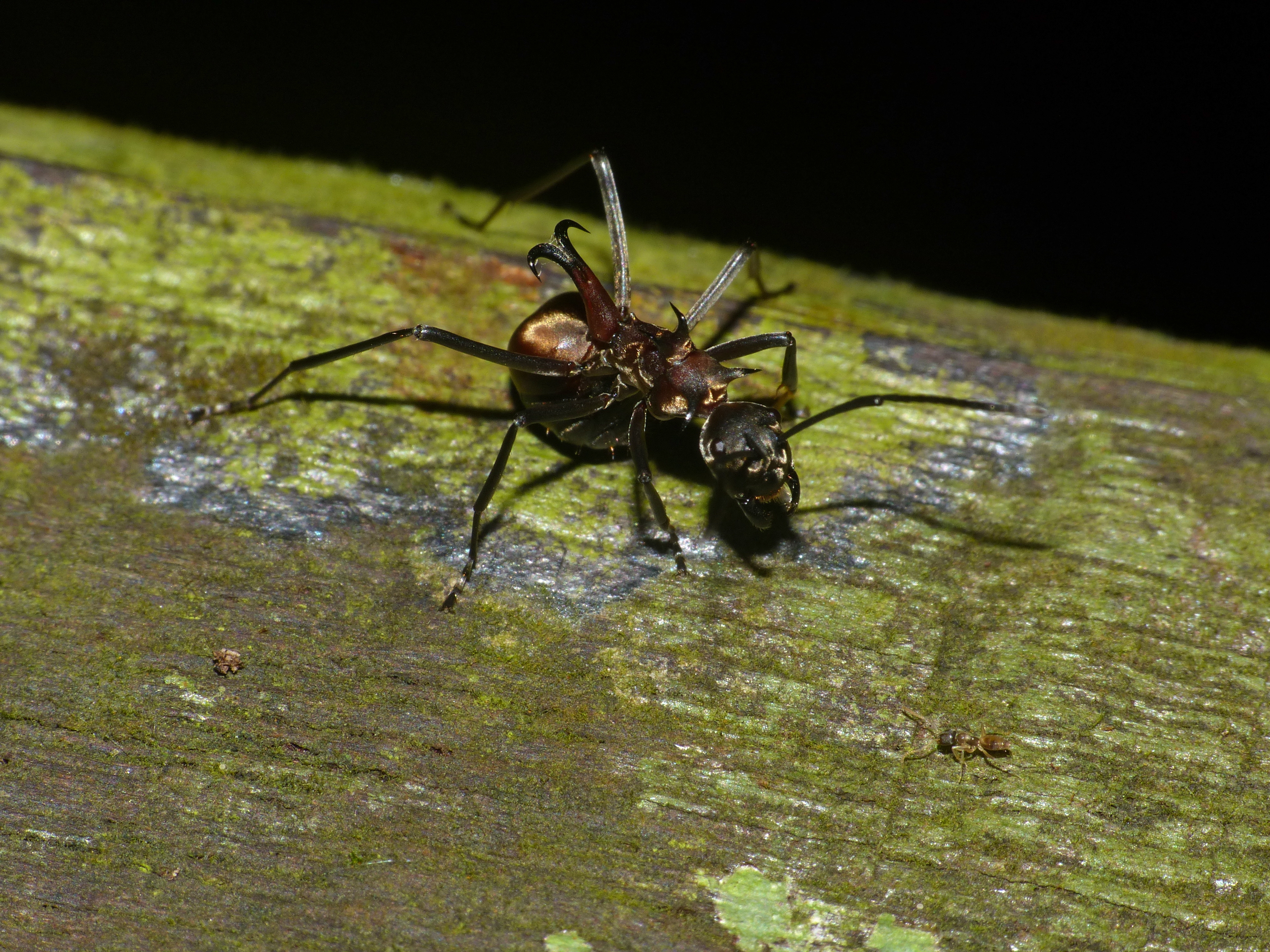
P. olybria

- Polyrhachis omissa Rigato, 2016
- Polyrhachis omyrmex Donisthorpe, 1938
- Polyrhachis opacita Kohout, 2013
- Polyrhachis opalescens Clark, 1930
- Polyrhachis ops Forel, 1907
- Polyrhachis orbihumera Xu, 2002
- Polyrhachis ornata Mayr, 1876

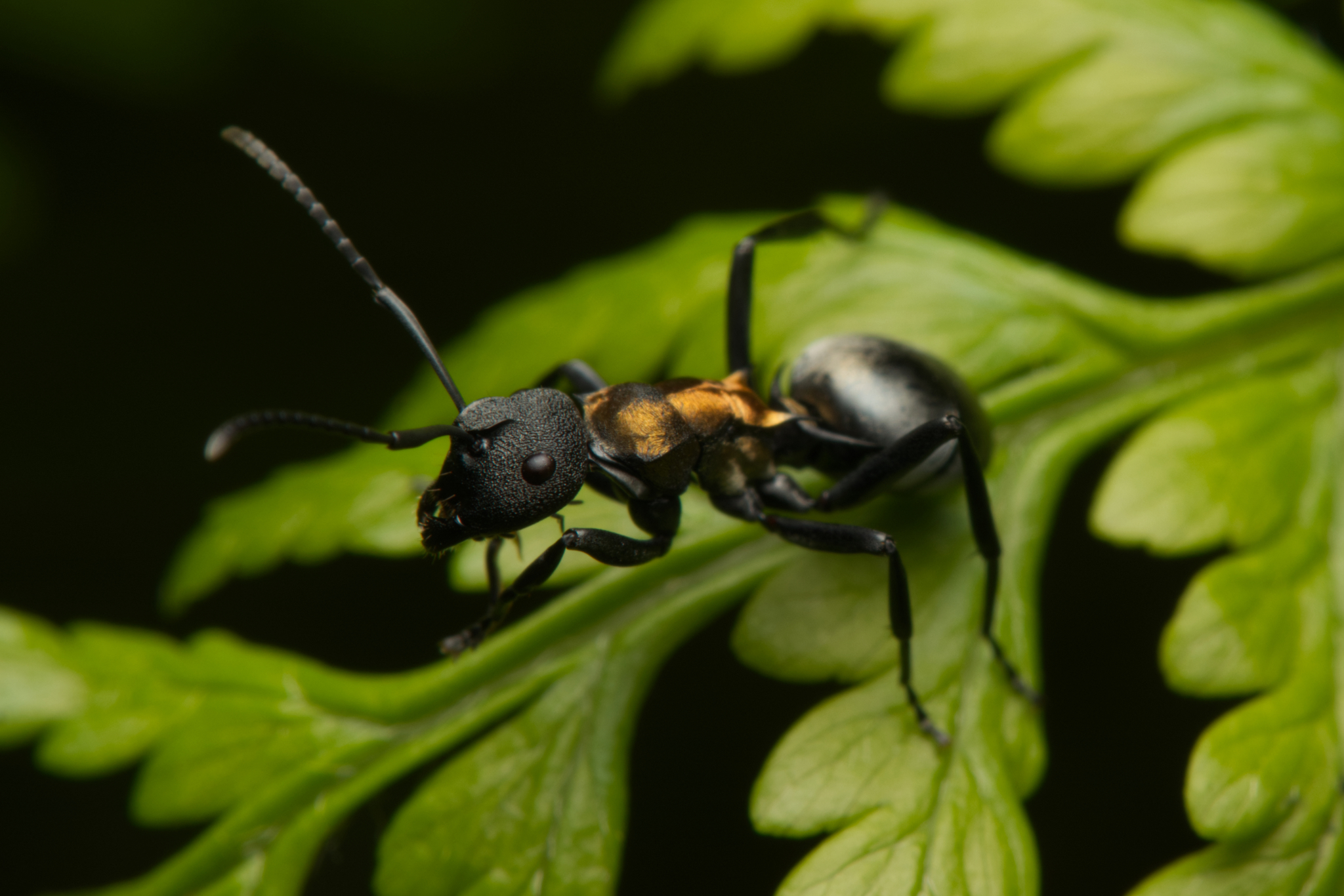
P. ornata

- Polyrhachis orokana Kohout, 2007
- Polyrhachis orpheus Forel, 1911
- Polyrhachis orsylla Smith, 1861
- Polyrhachis osae Mann, 1919
- Polyrhachis osiris Bolton, 1975
- Polyrhachis otleti Forel, 1916

== P ==
- Polyrhachis pacifica Kohout, 2006
- Polyrhachis pagana Santschi, 1928
- Polyrhachis palaearctica Dietrich, 2004
- Polyrhachis palawanensis Kohout, 2013
- Polyrhachis pallescens Mayr, 1876
- Polyrhachis pallipes Donisthorpe, 1948
- Polyrhachis palmerae Kohout, 2013
- Polyrhachis parabiotica Chapman, 1963
- Polyrhachis paracamponota Wang & Wu, 1991
- Polyrhachis paromala Smith, 1863
- Polyrhachis parva Kohout, 2007
- Polyrhachis patiens Santschi, 1920
- Polyrhachis paxilla Smith, 1863
- Polyrhachis peetersi Wong & Guénard, 2020
- Polyrhachis pelecta Kohout, 2007
- Polyrhachis pellita Menozzi, 1922
- Polyrhachis penelope Forel, 1895
- Polyrhachis peregrina Smith, 1860
- Polyrhachis personata Wheeler, 1919
- Polyrhachis phalerata Menozzi, 1926
- Polyrhachis phidias Forel, 1910
- Polyrhachis philippinensis Smith, 1858
- Polyrhachis phryne Forel, 1907

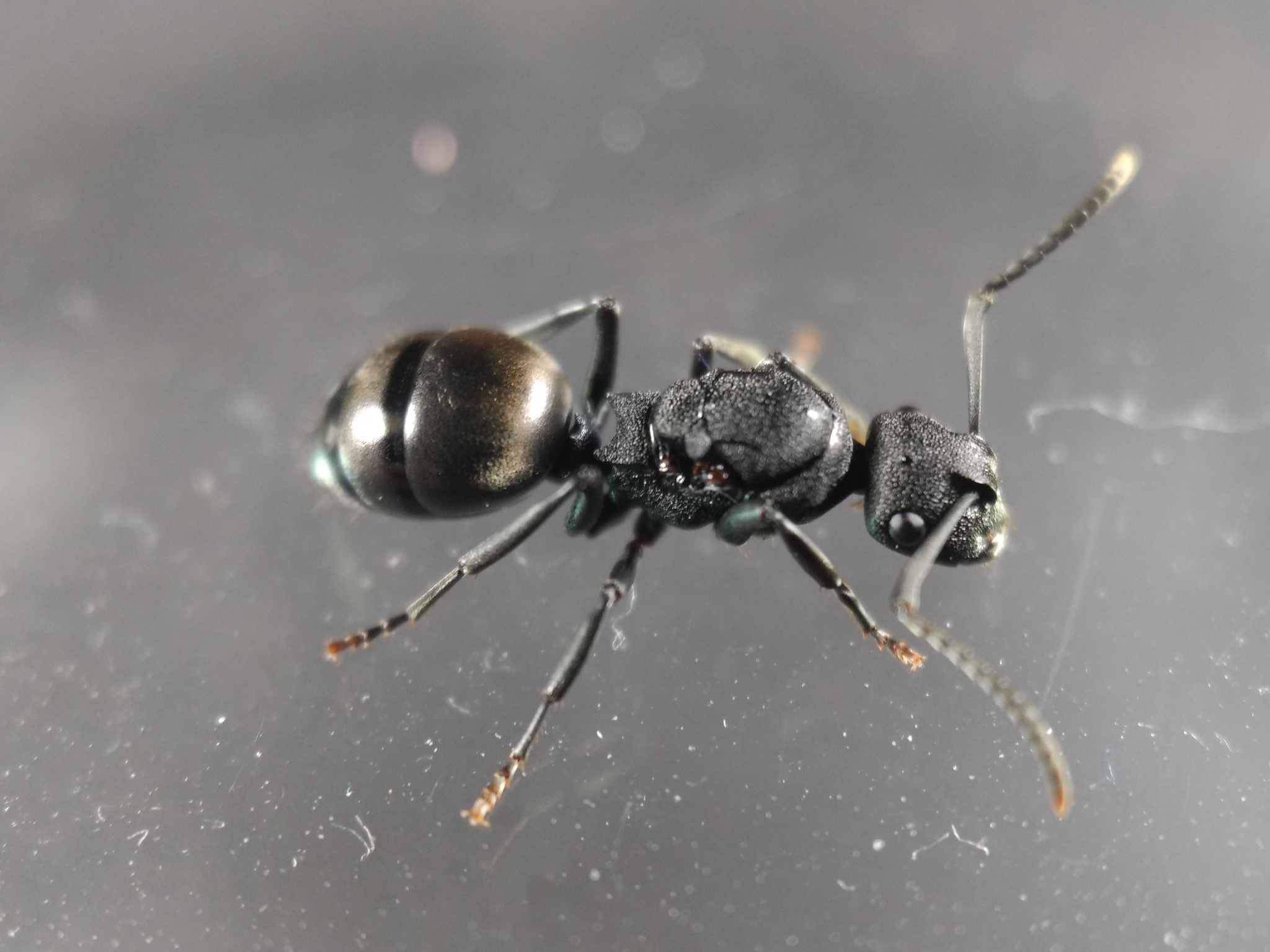
P. phryne

- Polyrhachis pilbara Kohout, 2013
- Polyrhachis pilosa Donisthorpe, 1938

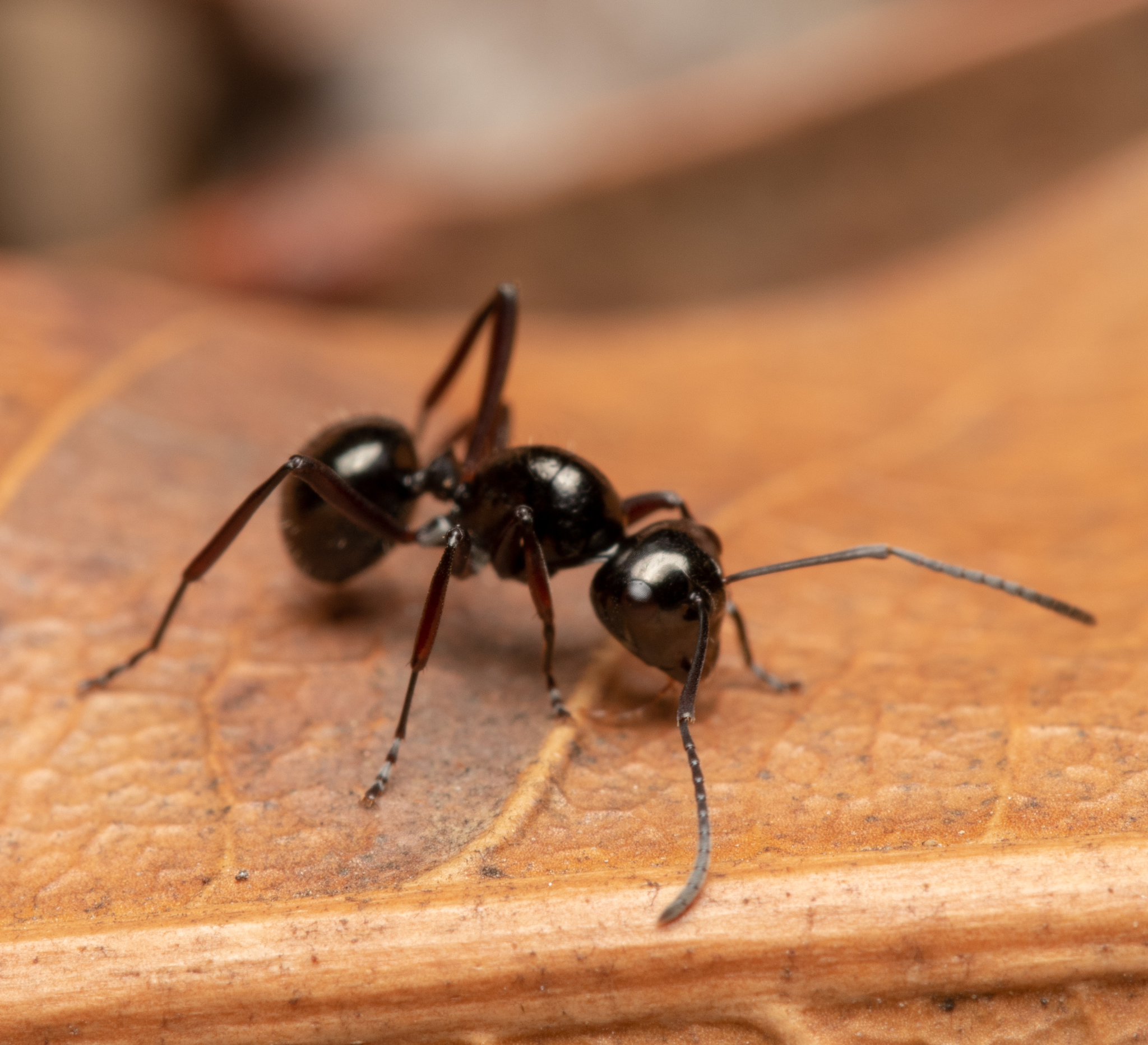
P. pilosa

- Polyrhachis pirata Sorger & Zettel, 2009
- Polyrhachis placida Kohout, 2013
- Polyrhachis planata Kohout, 2007
- Polyrhachis planoculata Kohout, 2013
- Polyrhachis plato Forel, 1911
- Polyrhachis platynota Stitz, 1933
- Polyrhachis platyomma Emery, 1921
- Polyrhachis polymnia Forel, 1902
- Polyrhachis porcata Emery, 1921
- Polyrhachis pressa Mayr, 1862
- Polyrhachis procera Emery, 1897
- Polyrhachis prometheus Santschi, 1920
- Polyrhachis proxima Roger, 1863
- Polyrhachis pruinosa Mayr, 1872
- Polyrhachis pseudothrinax Hung,1967
- Polyrhachis pubescens Mayr, 1879
- Polyrhachis pulleni Kohout, 2013
- Polyrhachis punctillata Roger, 1863
- Polyrhachis punctiventris Mayr, 1876

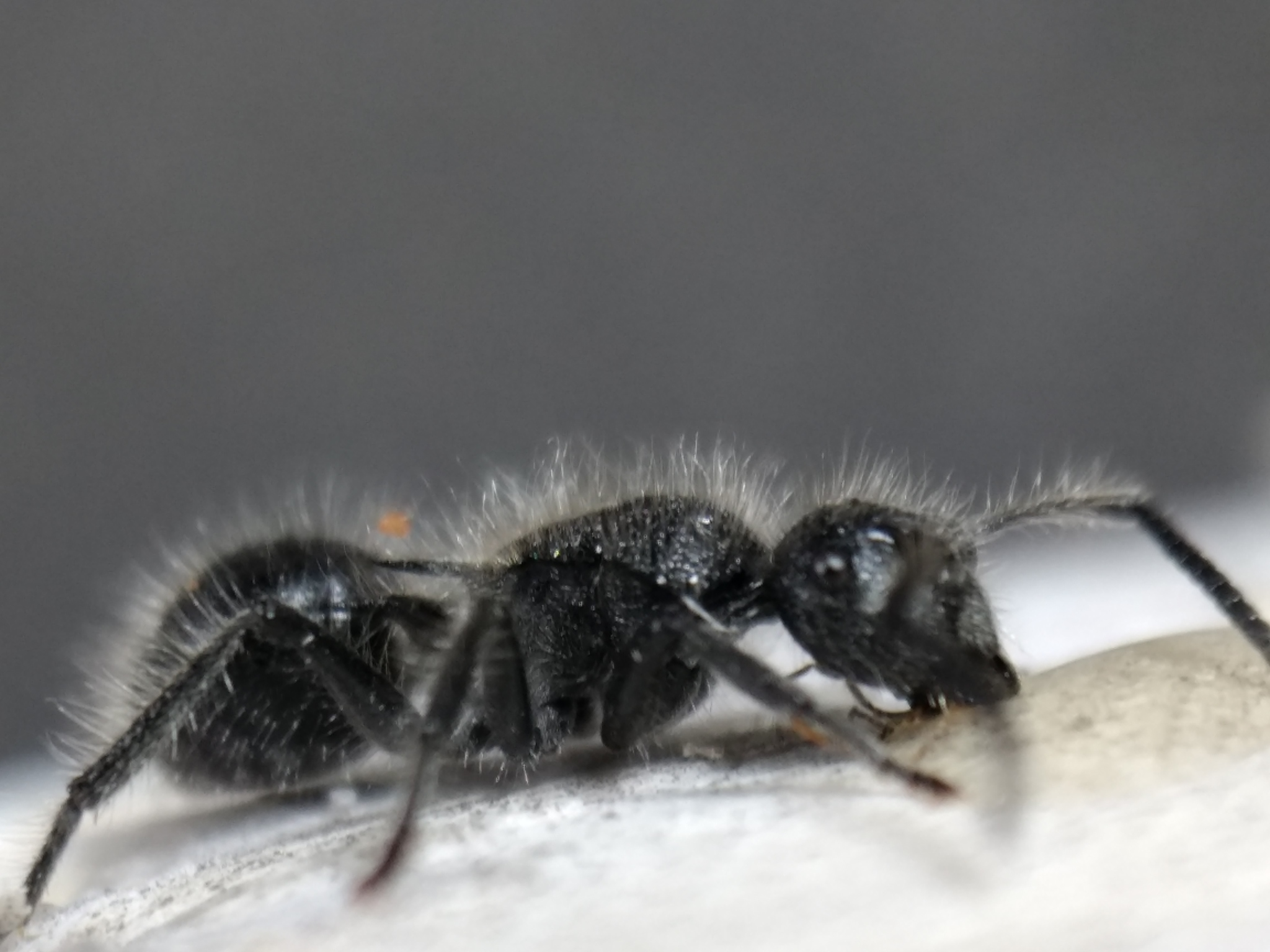
P. punctiventris

- Polyrhachis punjabi Bharti, 2003
- Polyrhachis pyrrhus Forel, 1910

== Q ==
- Polyrhachis quadrispinosa Jaitrong & Noon-Anant, 2023
- Polyrhachis queenslandica Forel, 1901

== R ==
- Polyrhachis radicicola Dahl, 1901
- Polyrhachis ralumensis Forel, 1901
- Polyrhachis rastellata Latreille, 1802
- Polyrhachis reclinata Emery, 1887
- Polyrhachis regesa Bolton, 1973
- Polyrhachis regularis Mayr, 1867
- Polyrhachis relucens Latreille, 1802
- Polyrhachis rere Mann, 1919
- Polyrhachis retrorsa Emery, 1900
- Polyrhachis retusa Kohout, 2007
- Polyrhachis revoili Andre, 1887
- Polyrhachis rhea Forel, 1911
- Polyrhachis ridleyi Forel, 1912
- Polyrhachis rixosa Smith, 1858
- Polyrhachis roberti Kohout, 2007
- Polyrhachis robsoni Kohout, 2006

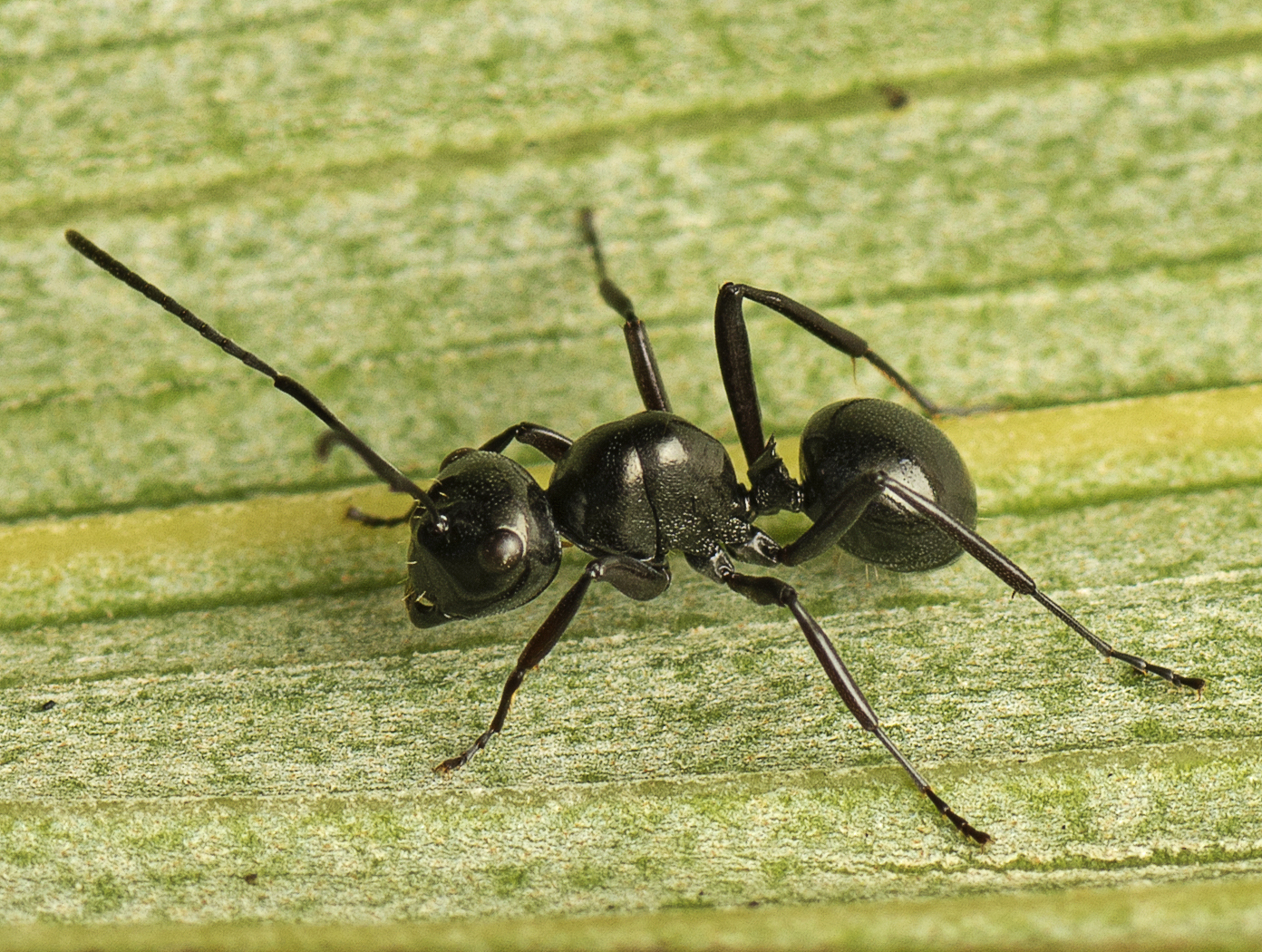
P. robsoni

- Polyrhachis robusta Kohout, 2013
- Polyrhachis romanovi Santschi, 1928
- Polyrhachis roomi Kohout, 2007
- Polyrhachis rossi Donisthorpe, 1948
- Polyrhachis rotoccipita Xu, 2002
- Polyrhachis rotumana Wilson & Taylor, 1967
- Polyrhachis rowlandi Forel, 1910
- Polyrhachis rubigastrica Wu & Wang, 1991
- Polyrhachis ruficornis Smith, 1857
- Polyrhachis rufifemur Forel, 1907

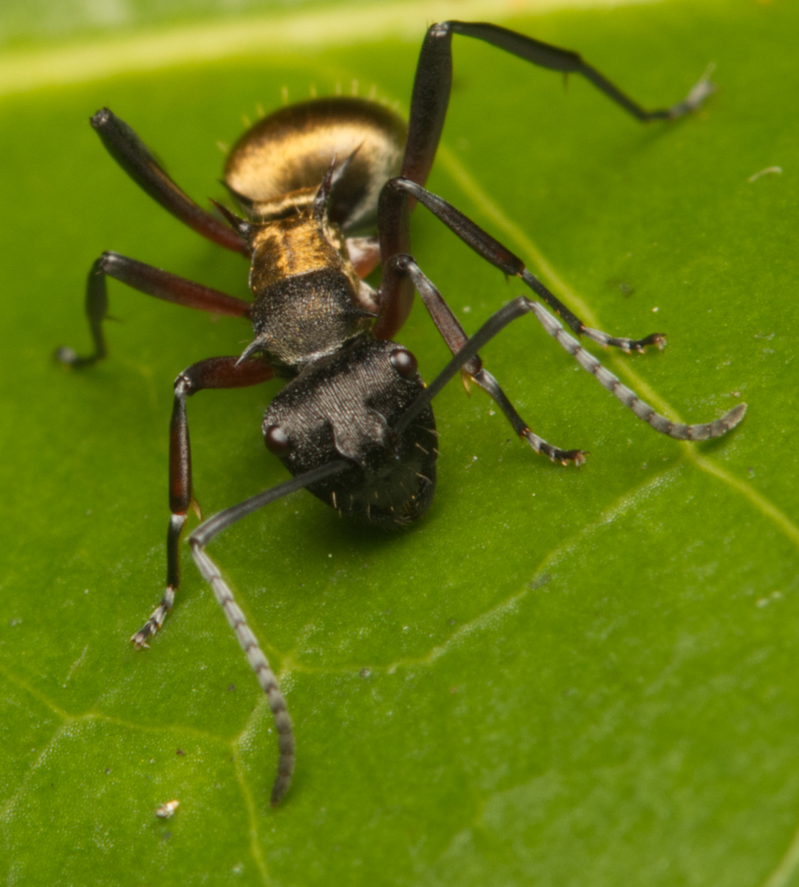
P. rufifemur

- Polyrhachis rufipalpis Santschi, 1910
- Polyrhachis rufipes Smith, 1858

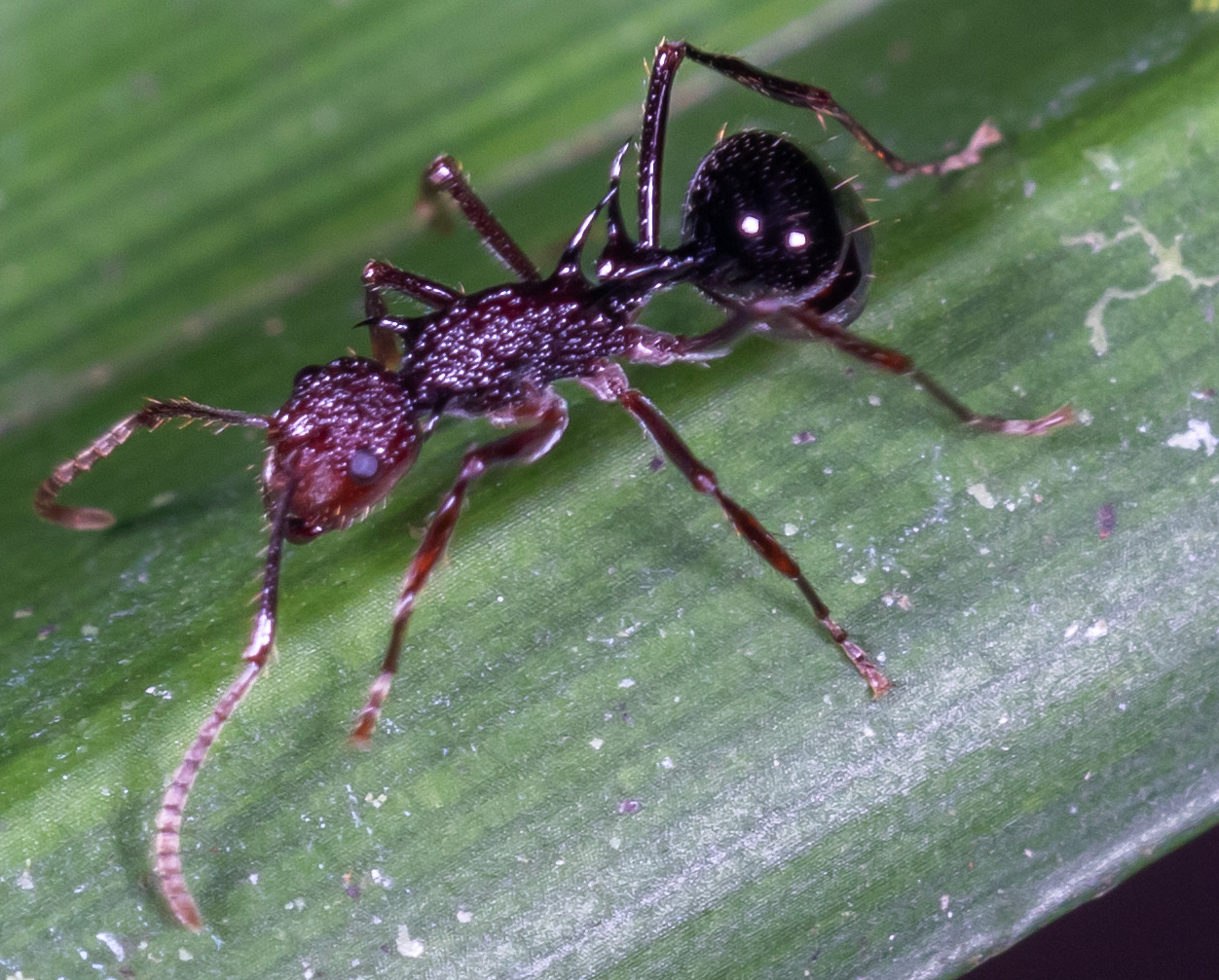
P. rufipes

- Polyrhachis rufofemorata Smith, 1859
- Polyrhachis rugifrons Smith, 1860
- Polyrhachis rupicapra Roger, 1863
- Polyrhachis rustica Kohout, 1990
- Polyrhachis rutila Kohout, 2006

== S ==
- Polyrhachis saevissima Smith, 1860
- Polyrhachis saigonensis Forel, 1886
- Polyrhachis salebrosa Kohout, 2008
- Polyrhachis salomo Forel, 1910
- Polyrhachis santschii Mann, 1919
- Polyrhachis scabra Kohout, 1987
- Polyrhachis scapulata Santschi, 1932
- Polyrhachis schang Forel, 1879
- Polyrhachis schellerichae Dorow, 1996
- Polyrhachis schenckii Forel, 1886
- Polyrhachis schistacea Gerstaecker, 1859

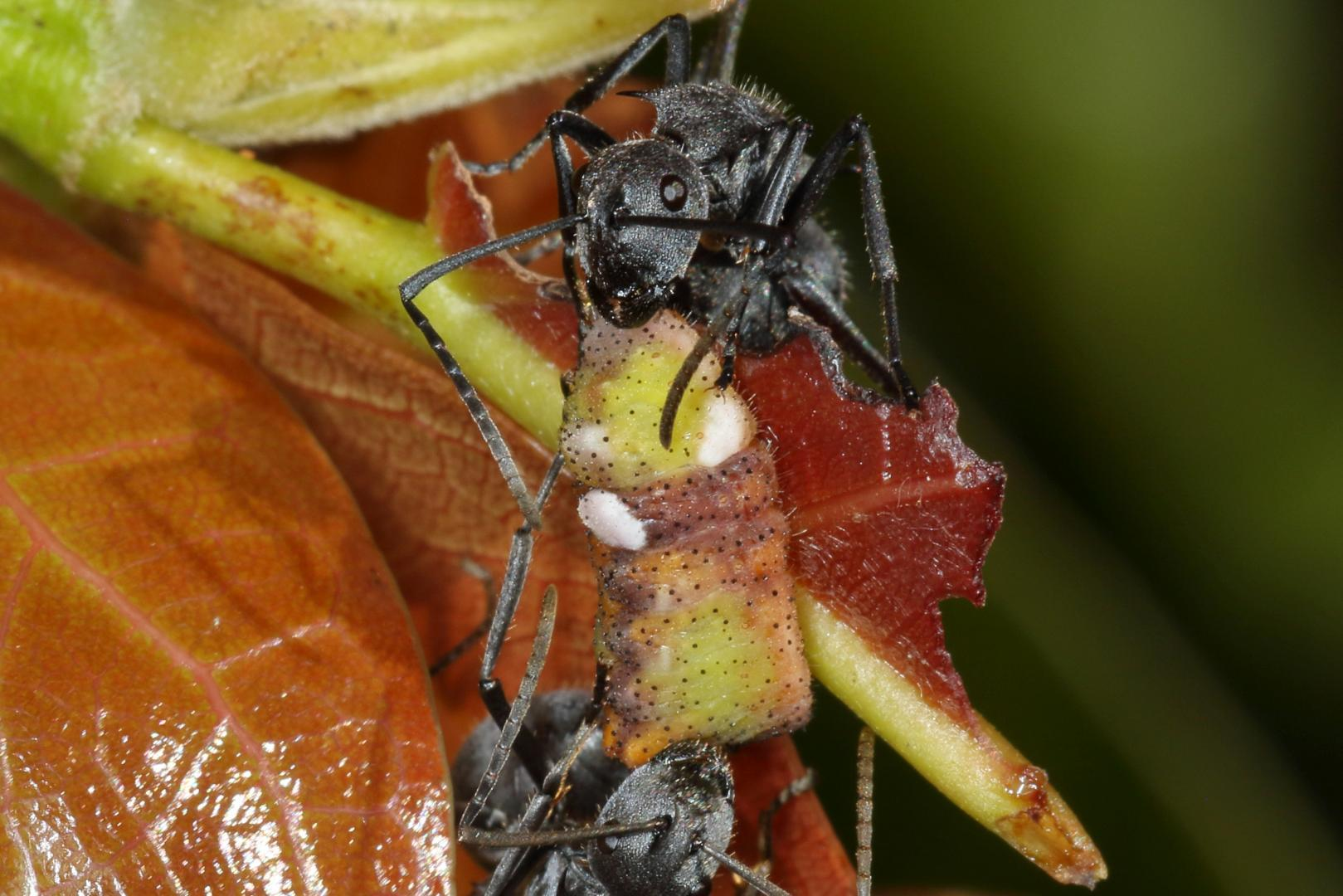
P. schistacea

- Polyrhachis schlueteri Forel, 1886

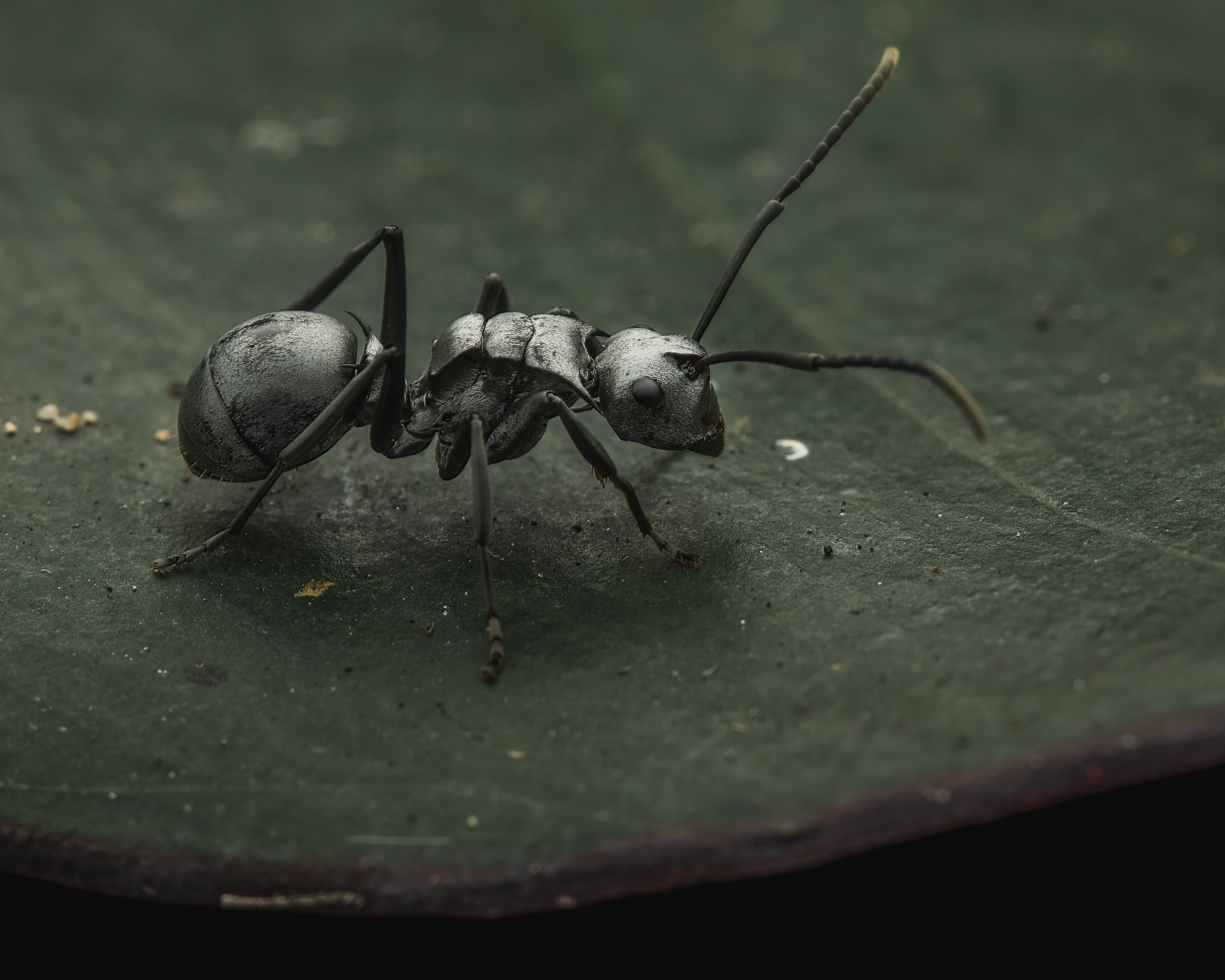
P. schlueteri

- Polyrhachis schoopae Forel, 1902

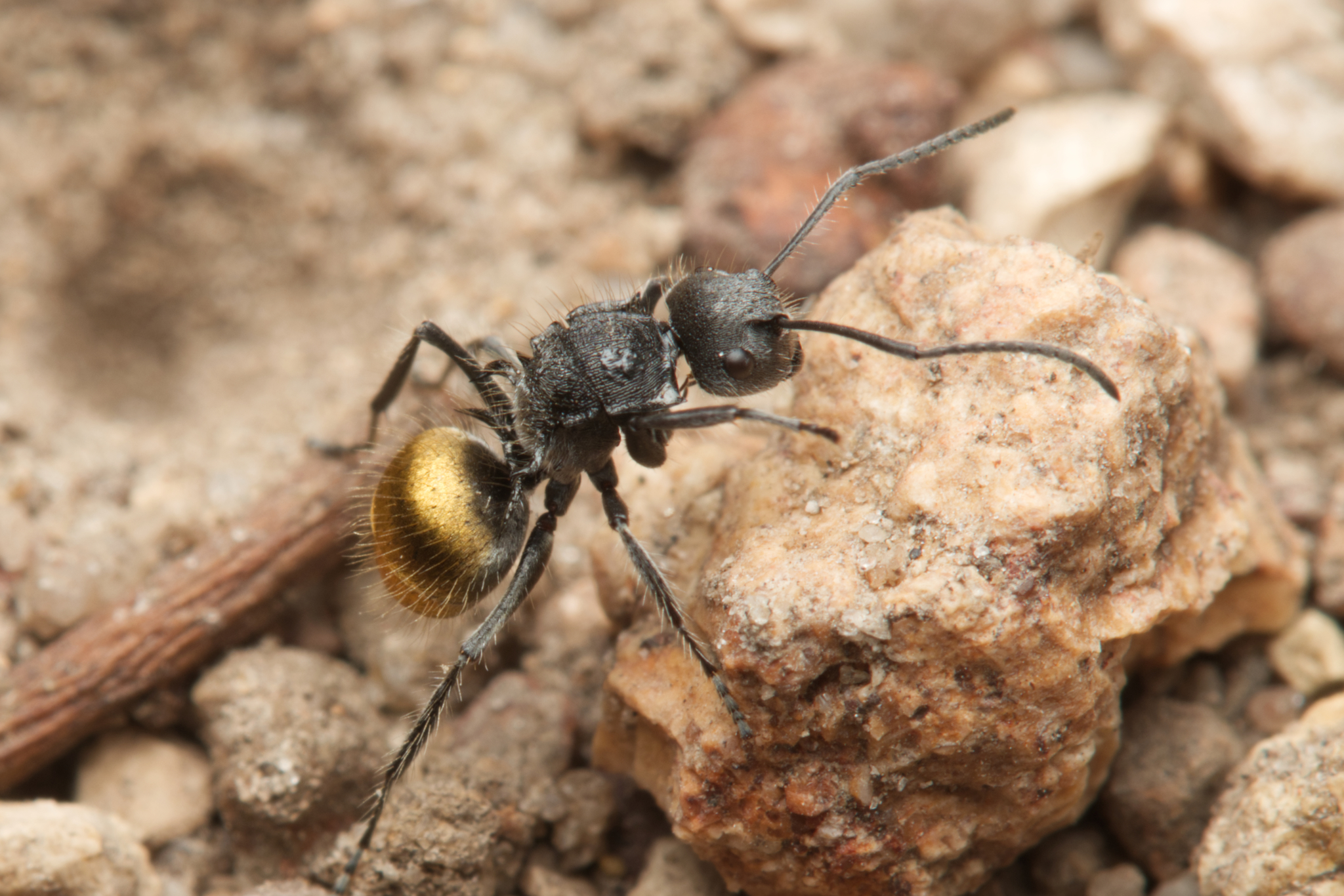
P. schoopae

- Polyrhachis schwiedlandi Forel, 1902
- Polyrhachis scissa Roger, 1862
- Polyrhachis sculpta Emery, 1887
- Polyrhachis sculpturata Smith, 1860
- Polyrhachis scutulata Smith, 1859
- Polyrhachis sedlaceki Kohout, 2006
- Polyrhachis seducta Kohout, 2013
- Polyrhachis selecta Forel, 1911
- Polyrhachis semiaurata Mayr, 1876

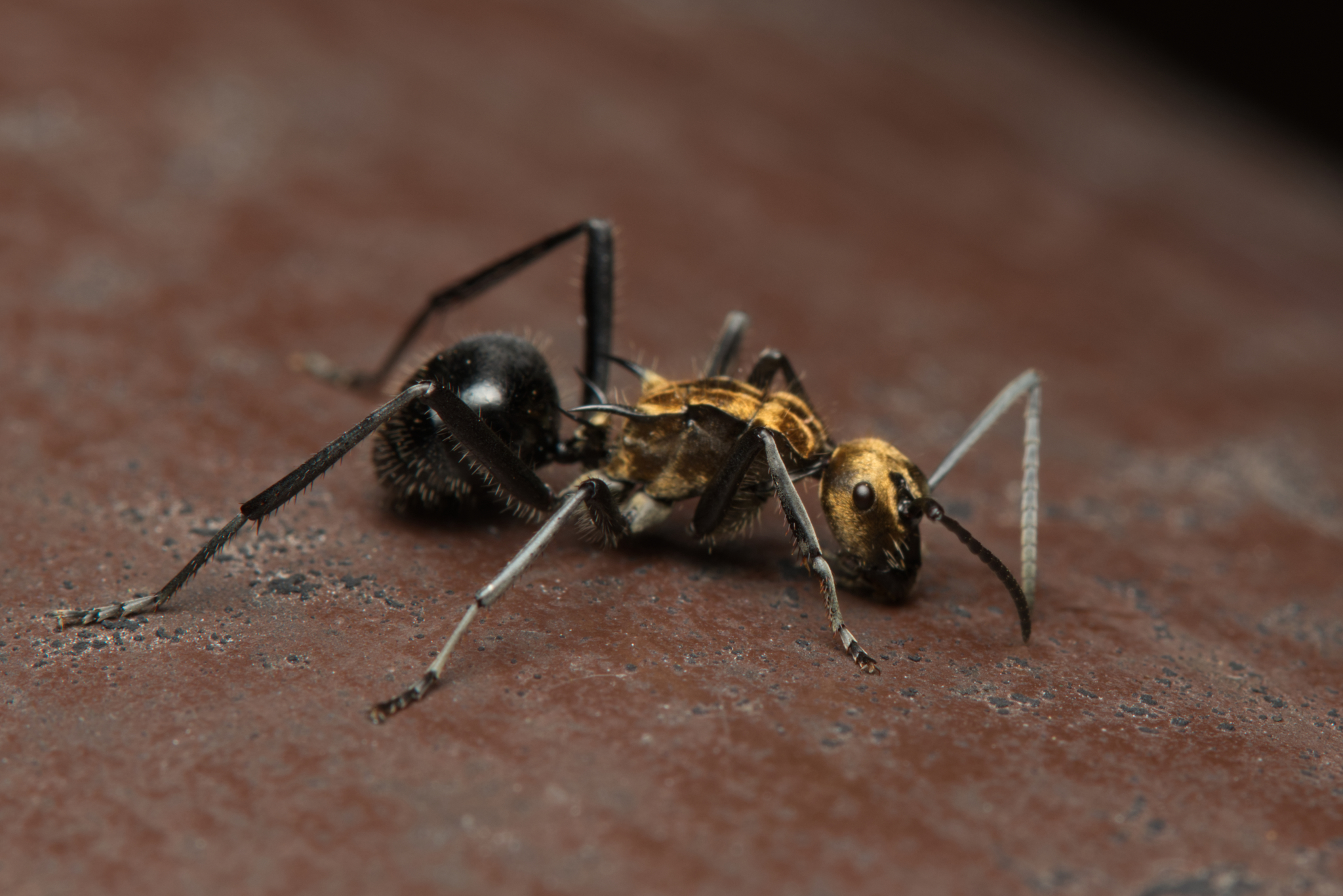
P. semiaurata

- Polyrhachis semiinermis Donisthorpe, 1941
- Polyrhachis semiobscura Donisthorpe, 1944
- Polyrhachis semipolita Andre, 1896
- Polyrhachis semitestacea Emery, 1900
- Polyrhachis senilis Forel, 1902

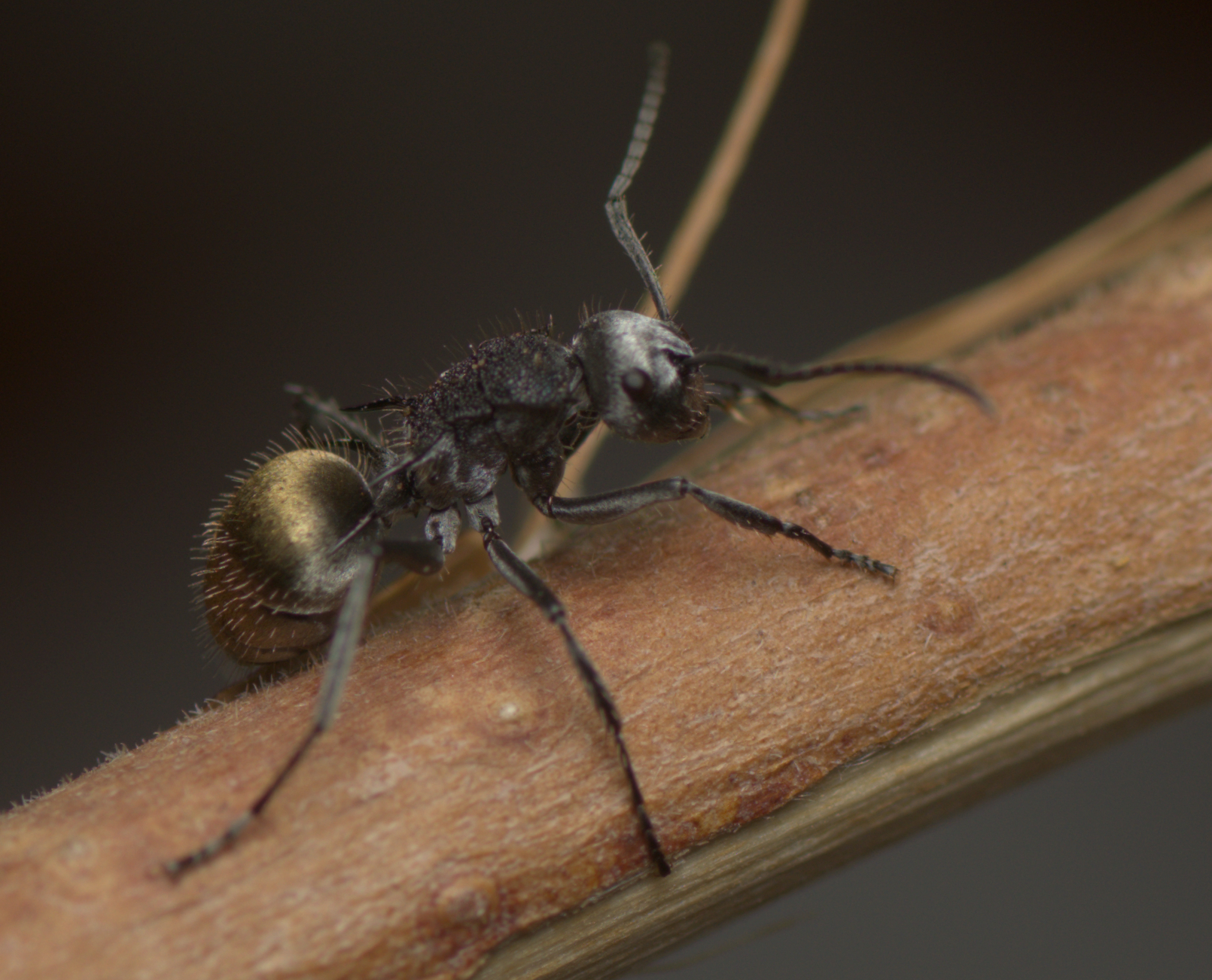
P. senilis

- Polyrhachis sericata Guerin-Meneville, 1831

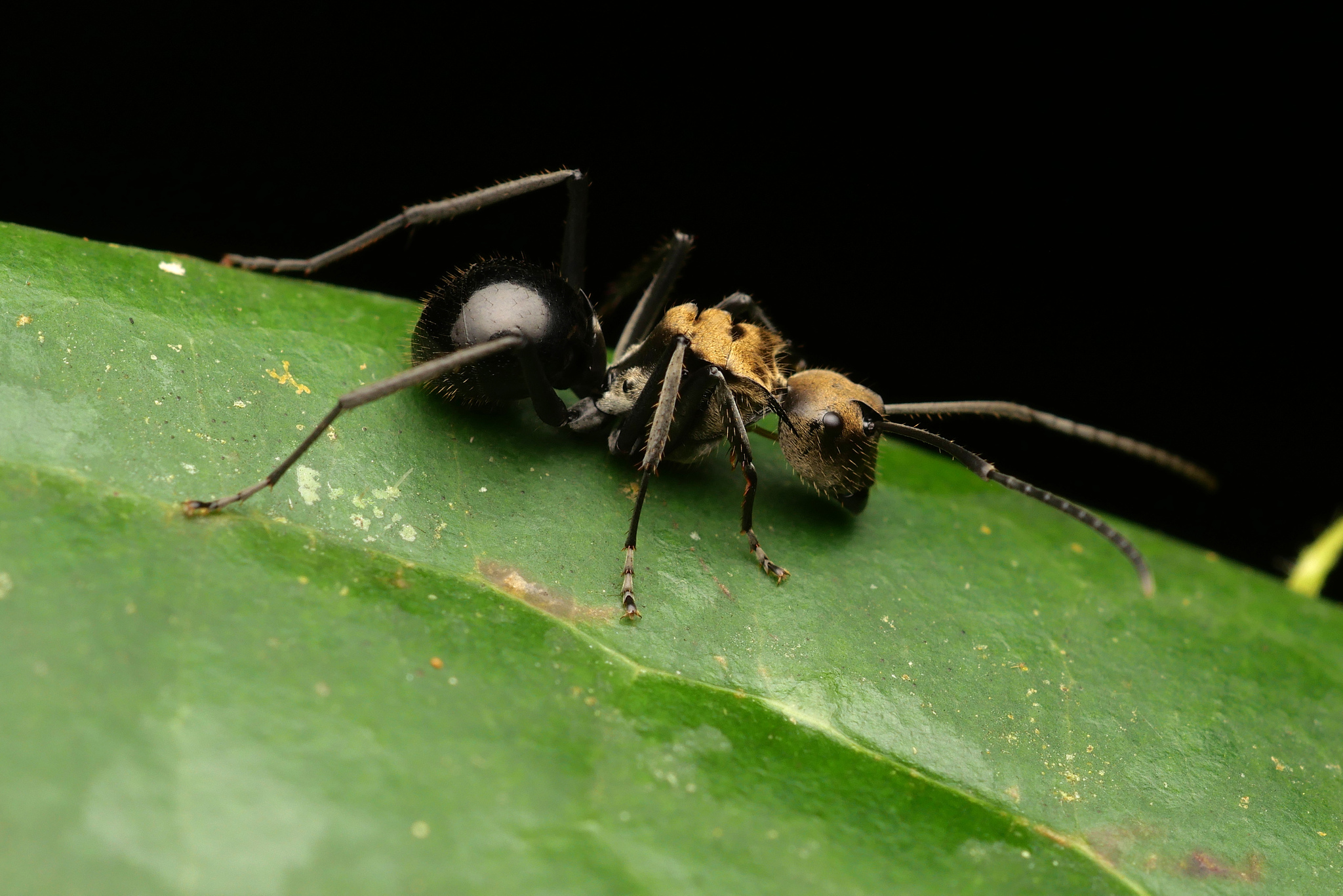
P. sericata

- Polyrhachis sericeopubescens Donisthorpe, 1941
- Polyrhachis setosa Kohout, 2006
- Polyrhachis sexspinosa Latreille, 1802
- Polyrhachis shattucki Kohout, 2013
- Polyrhachis shixingensis Wu & Wang, 1995
- Polyrhachis sidnica Mayr, 1866
- Polyrhachis similis Viehmeyer, 1912
- Polyrhachis simillima Emery, 1900
- Polyrhachis simpla Santschi, 1928
- Polyrhachis simulans Kohout, 2007
- Polyrhachis sinuata Kohout, 2013
- Polyrhachis smithersi Kohout, 2012
- Polyrhachis smithi Emery, 1901
- Polyrhachis snellingi Kohout, 2007
- Polyrhachis sokolova Forel, 1902
- Polyrhachis solivaga Menozzi, 1926
- Polyrhachis solmsi Emery, 1887
- Polyrhachis sophocles Forel, 1908
- Polyrhachis sparaxes Smith, 1863
- Polyrhachis spengeli Forel, 1912
- Polyrhachis spinicola Forel, 1894
- Polyrhachis spinifera Stitz, 1911
- Polyrhachis spinigera Mayr, 1879
- Polyrhachis spinosa Mayr, 1867
- Polyrhachis spitteleri Forel, 1916
- Polyrhachis splendens Santschi, 1932
- Polyrhachis starri Kohout, 2013
- Polyrhachis stigmatifera Kohout, 1990
- Polyrhachis stitzi Santschi, 1928
- Polyrhachis storki Kohout, 2008
- Polyrhachis striata Mayr, 1862
- Polyrhachis striatorugosa Mayr, 1862
- Polyrhachis stricta Kohout, 2013
- Polyrhachis strictifrons Emery, 1898
- Polyrhachis strumosa Kohout, 2006
- Polyrhachis stylifera Karavaiev, 1935
- Polyrhachis subaenescens Viehmeyer, 1912
- Polyrhachis subcyanea Emery, 1897
- Polyrhachis subfossa Viehmeyer, 1913
- Polyrhachis subfossoides Karavaiev, 1927
- Polyrhachis submarginata Rigato, 2016
- Polyrhachis subpilosa Emery, 1895
- Polyrhachis subtridens Emery, 1900
- Polyrhachis sukarmani Kohout, 2007
- Polyrhachis sulang Kohout, 2006
- Polyrhachis sulawesiensis Kohout, 2008
- Polyrhachis sulcata Andre, 1895
- Polyrhachis sulcifera Kohout, 2007
- Polyrhachis sylvicola Jerdon, 1851

== T ==
- Polyrhachis tambourinensis Forel, 1915
- Polyrhachis tanami Kohout, 2013
- Polyrhachis tapini Kohout, 2013
- Polyrhachis taylori Kohout, 1988
- Polyrhachis templi Forel, 1902

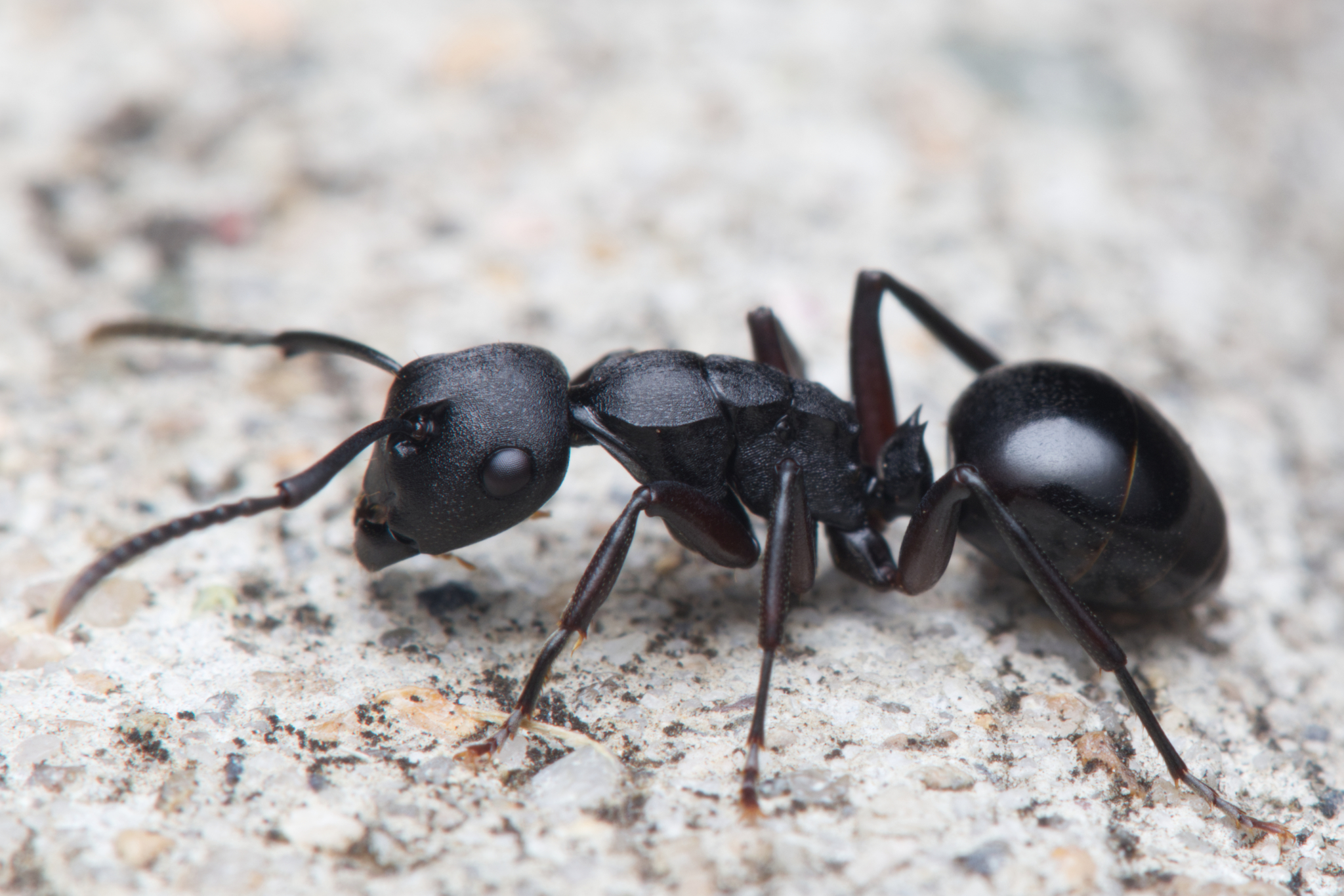
P. templi

- Polyrhachis tenebra Kohout, 2013
- Polyrhachis terminata Rigato, 2016
- Polyrhachis tersa Viehmeyer, 1914
- Polyrhachis terpsichore Forel, 1893
- Polyrhachis textor Smith, 1857
- Polyrhachis thailandica Kohout, 2006
- Polyrhachis thais Forel, 1910
- Polyrhachis thompsoni Bingham, 1903
- Polyrhachis thrinax Roger, 1863
- Polyrhachis thusnelda Forel, 1902

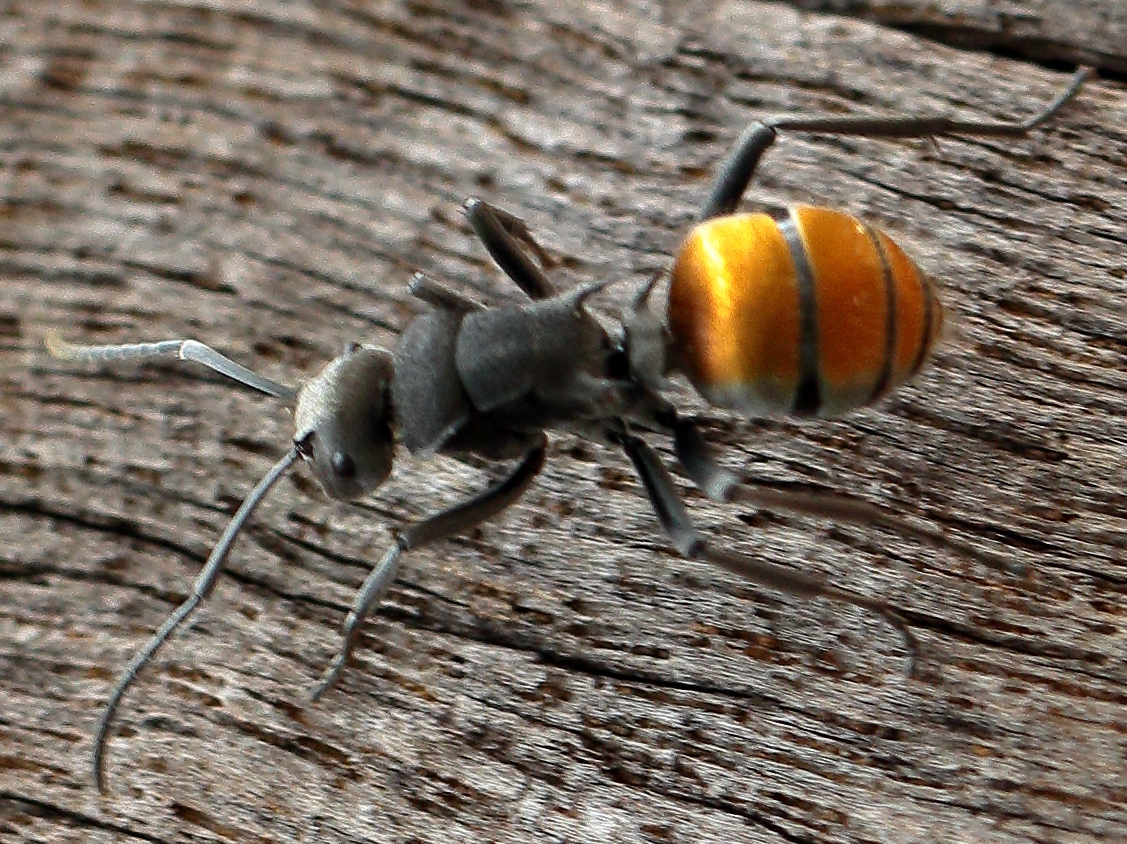
P. thusnelda

- Polyrhachis tianjingshanensis Qian & Zhou, 2008
- Polyrhachis tibialis Smith, 1858
- Polyrhachis tonsilis Santschi, 1928
- Polyrhachis tragos Stitz, 1925
- Polyrhachis transiens Bolton, 1973
- Polyrhachis trapezoidea Mayr, 1876

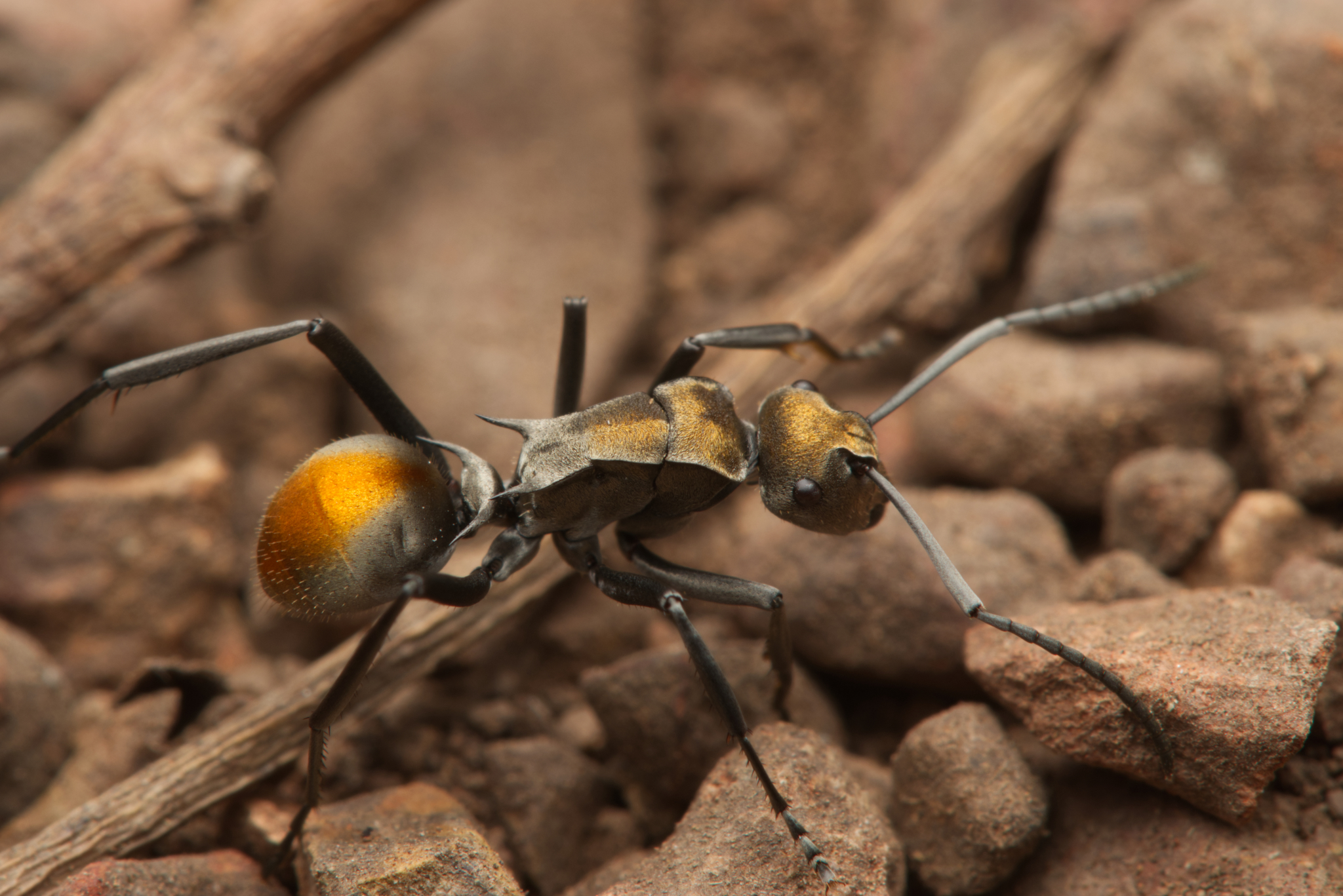
P. trapezoidea

- Polyrhachis triaena Wheeler, 1919
- Polyrhachis tricuspis Andre, 1887
- Polyrhachis trina Donisthorpe, 1944
- Polyrhachis trispinosa Smith, 1861
- Polyrhachis tristis Mayr, 1867
- Polyrhachis trophima Smith, 1863
- Polyrhachis tschu Forel, 1879
- Polyrhachis tubericeps Forel, 1893

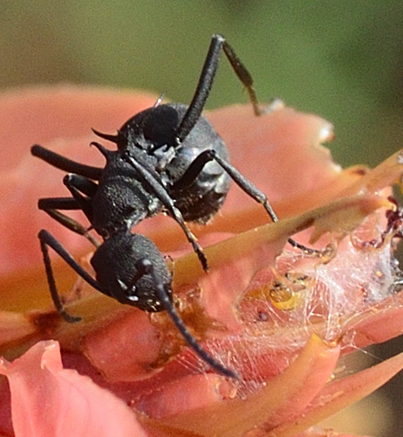
P. tubericeps

- Polyrhachis tuberosa Kohout, 2006
- Polyrhachis thusnelda Forel, 1902
- Polyrhachis tubifera Forel, 1902

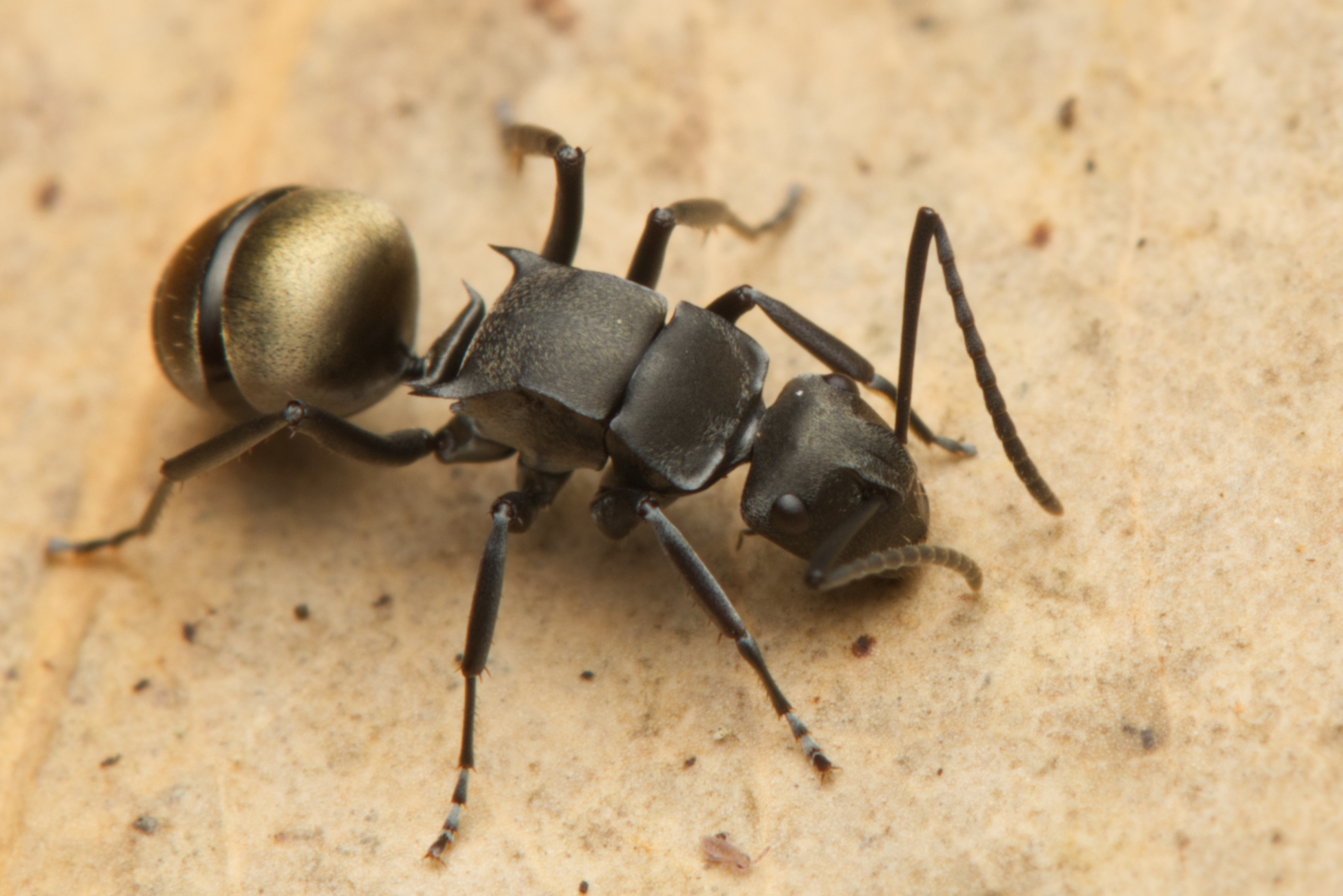
P. tubifera

- Polyrhachis tubifex Karavaiev, 1926
- Polyrhachis turneri Forel, 1895
- Polyrhachis tyrannica Smith, 1858

== U ==
- Polyrhachis ugiensis Mann, 1919
- Polyrhachis ulysses Forel, 1910
- Polyrhachis umboi Kohout, 2007
- Polyrhachis uncaria Kohout, 2013
- Polyrhachis undulata Kohout, 2006
- Polyrhachis unicornis Kohout, 2013
- Polyrhachis unicuspis Emery, 1898

== V ==
- Polyrhachis vanachterbergi Kohout, 2008
- Polyrhachis varicolor Viehmeyer, 1916
- Polyrhachis variegata Kohout, 2007
- Polyrhachis venus Forel, 1893

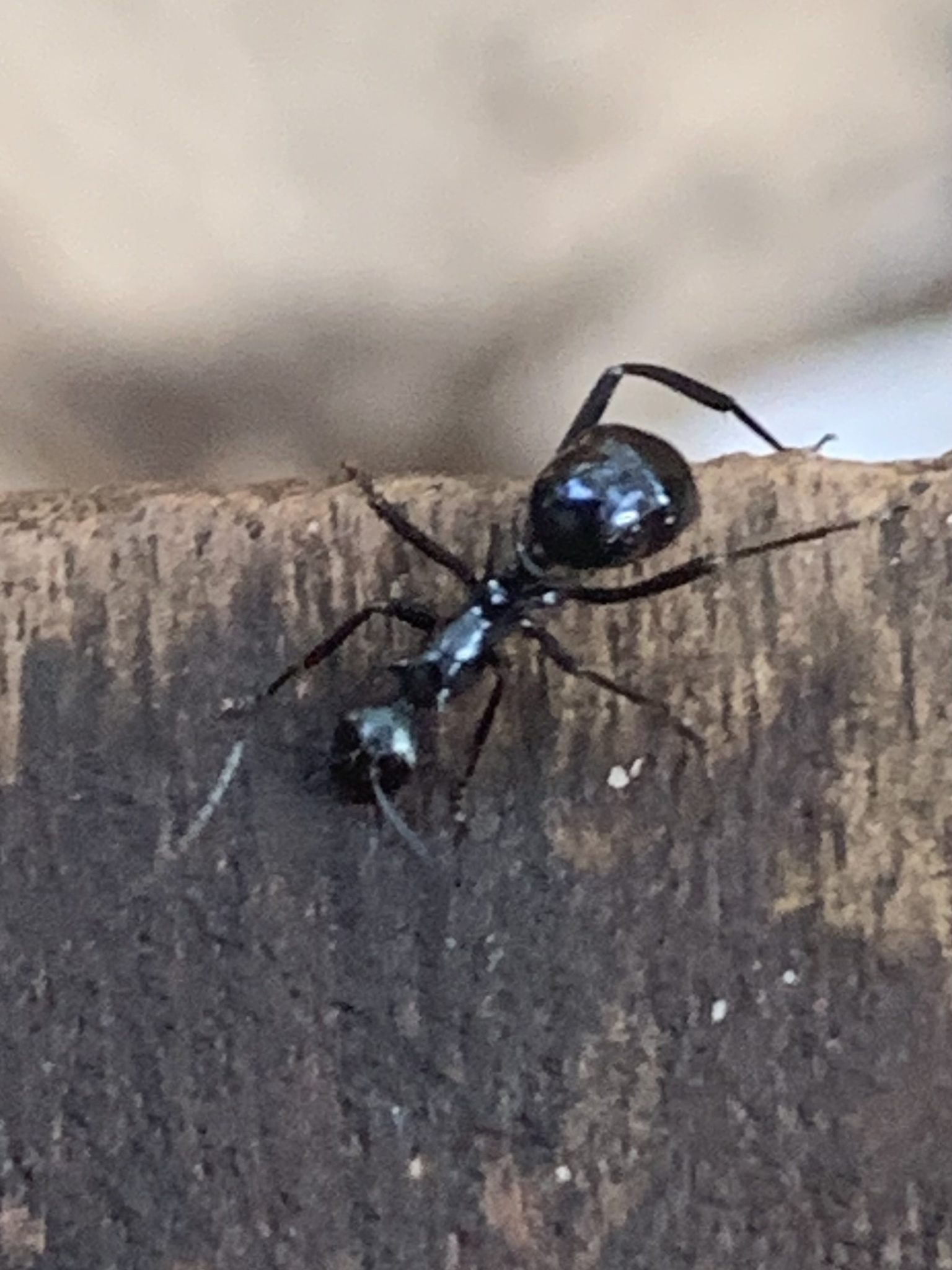
P. venus

- Polyrhachis vermiculosa Mayr, 1876

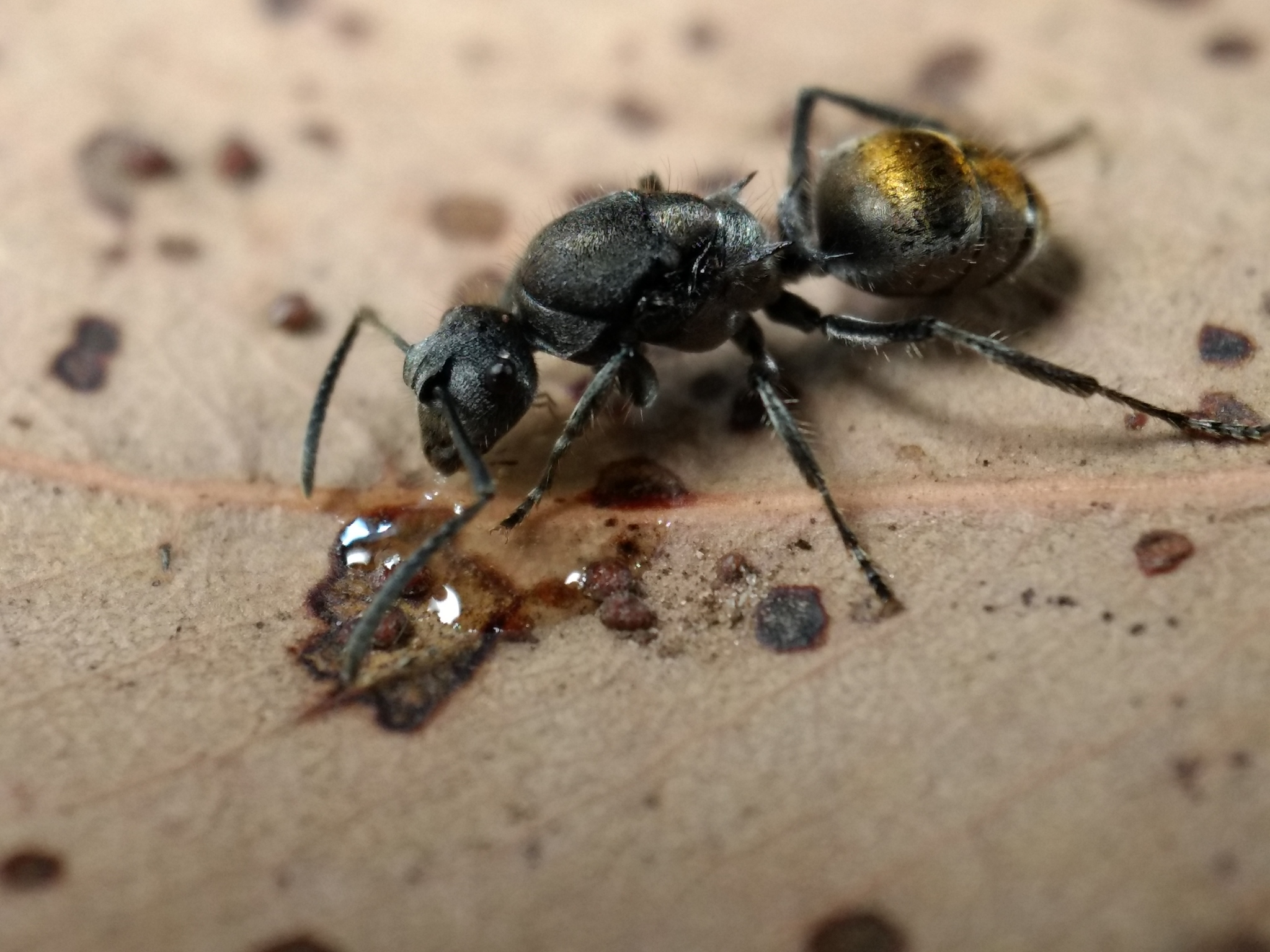
P. vermiculosa

- Polyrhachis vernoni Kohout, 2013
- Polyrhachis vestita Smith, 1860
- Polyrhachis viehmeyeri Emery, 1921
- Polyrhachis vigilans Smith, 1858

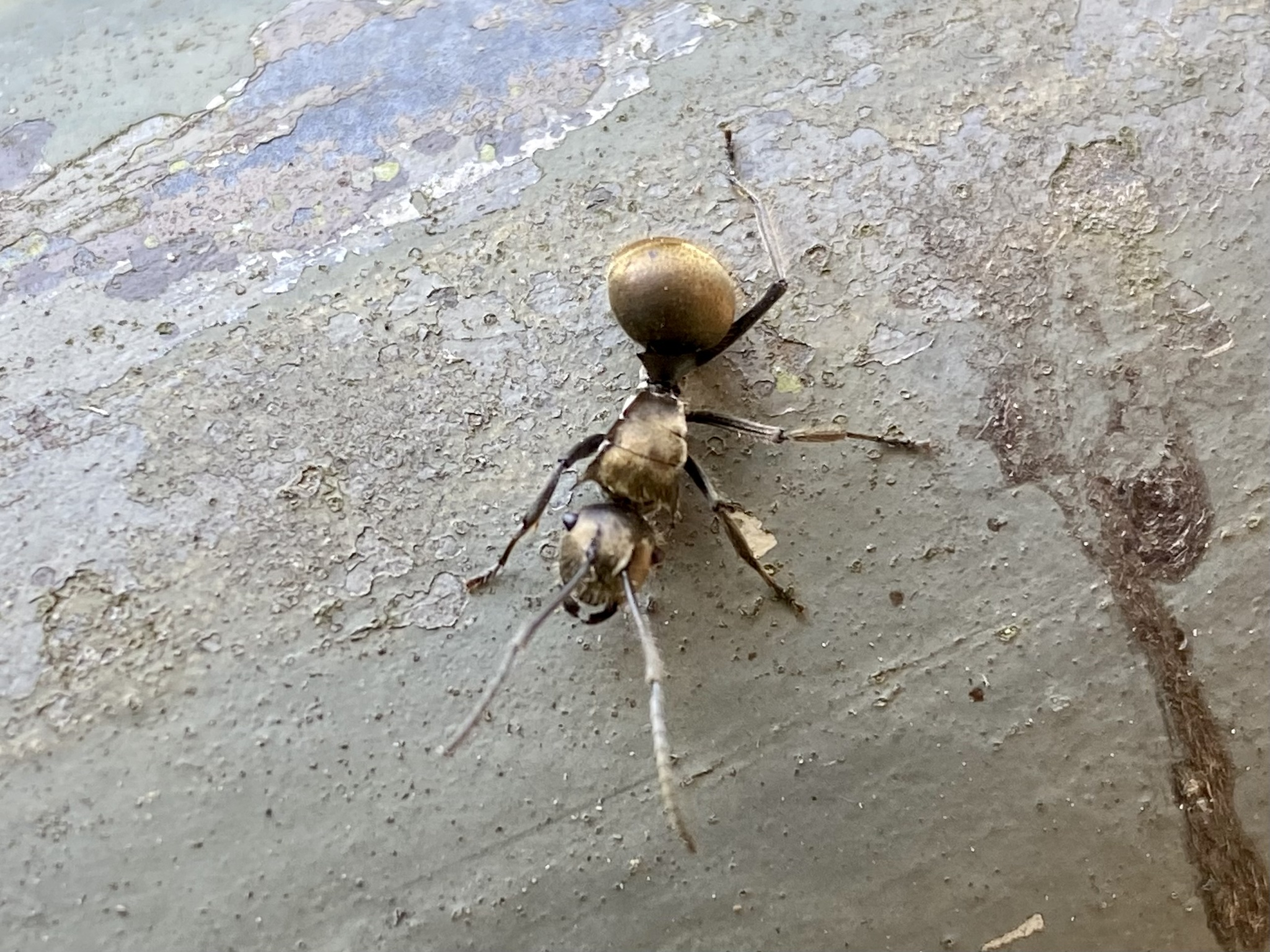
P. vigilans

- Polyrhachis villipes Smith, 1857
- Polyrhachis villosa Emery, 1897
- Polyrhachis vindex Smith, 1857
- Polyrhachis viola Zettel, 2013
- Polyrhachis violaceonigra Viehmeyer, 1914
- Polyrhachis viscosa Smith, 1858
- Polyrhachis vitalisi Santschi, 1920
- Polyrhachis volkarti Forel, 1916

== W ==
- Polyrhachis wagneri Viehmeyer, 1914
- Polyrhachis waigeuensis Donisthorpe, 1943
- Polyrhachis wallacei Emery, 1887
- Polyrhachis wamuki Kohout, 2007
- Polyrhachis wardi Kohout, 2007
- Polyrhachis watanasiti Kohout, 2013
- Polyrhachis weiri Kohout, 2013
- Polyrhachis weissi Santschi, 1910
- Polyrhachis wellmani Forel, 1909
- Polyrhachis wheeleri Mann, 1919
- Polyrhachis widodoi Kohout, 2006
- Polyrhachis wilmsi Forel, 1910
- Polyrhachis wilsoni Kohout, 2007
- Polyrhachis wolfi Forel, 1912

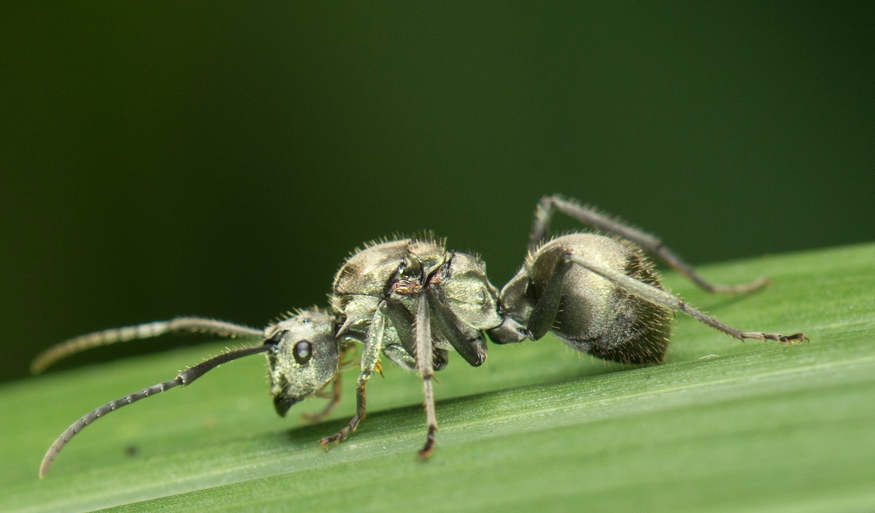
P. wolfi

- Polyrhachis wroughtonii Forel, 1894

== X ==
- Polyrhachis xanthippe Forel, 1911
- Polyrhachis xiphias Smith, 1863

== Y ==
- Polyrhachis yarrabahensis Forel, 1915
- Polyrhachis yerburyi Forel, 1893
- Polyrhachis yorkana Forel, 1915
- Polyrhachis ypsilon Emery, 1887

== Z ==
- Polyrhachis zhengi Zhou & Huang, 2002
- Polyrhachis zhoui Chen & Guénard, 2025
- Polyrhachis zimmerae Clark, 1941
- Polyrhachis zopyra Smith, 1861

== Extinct ==
- †Polyrhachis annosa Wappler et al., 2009
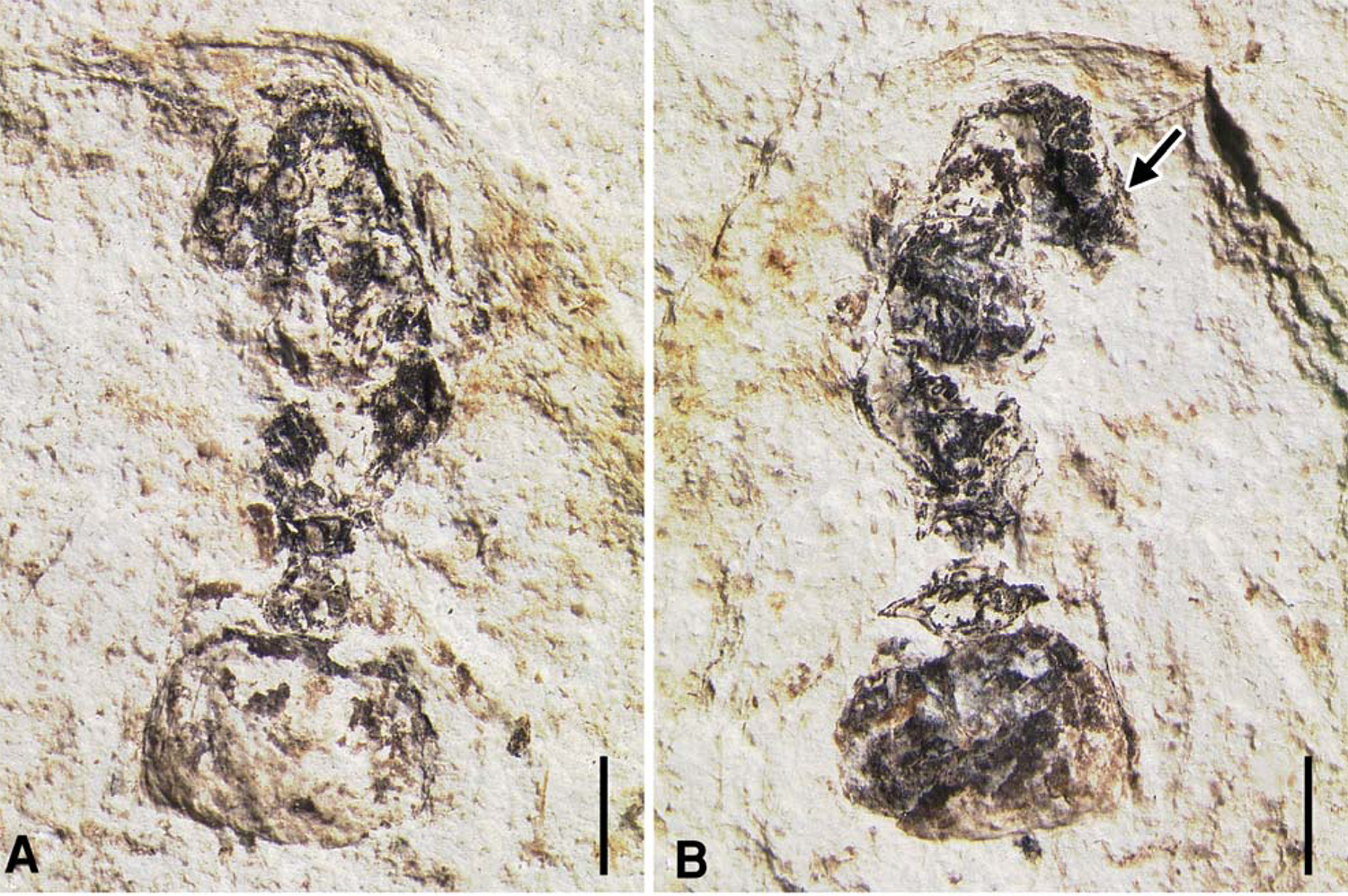
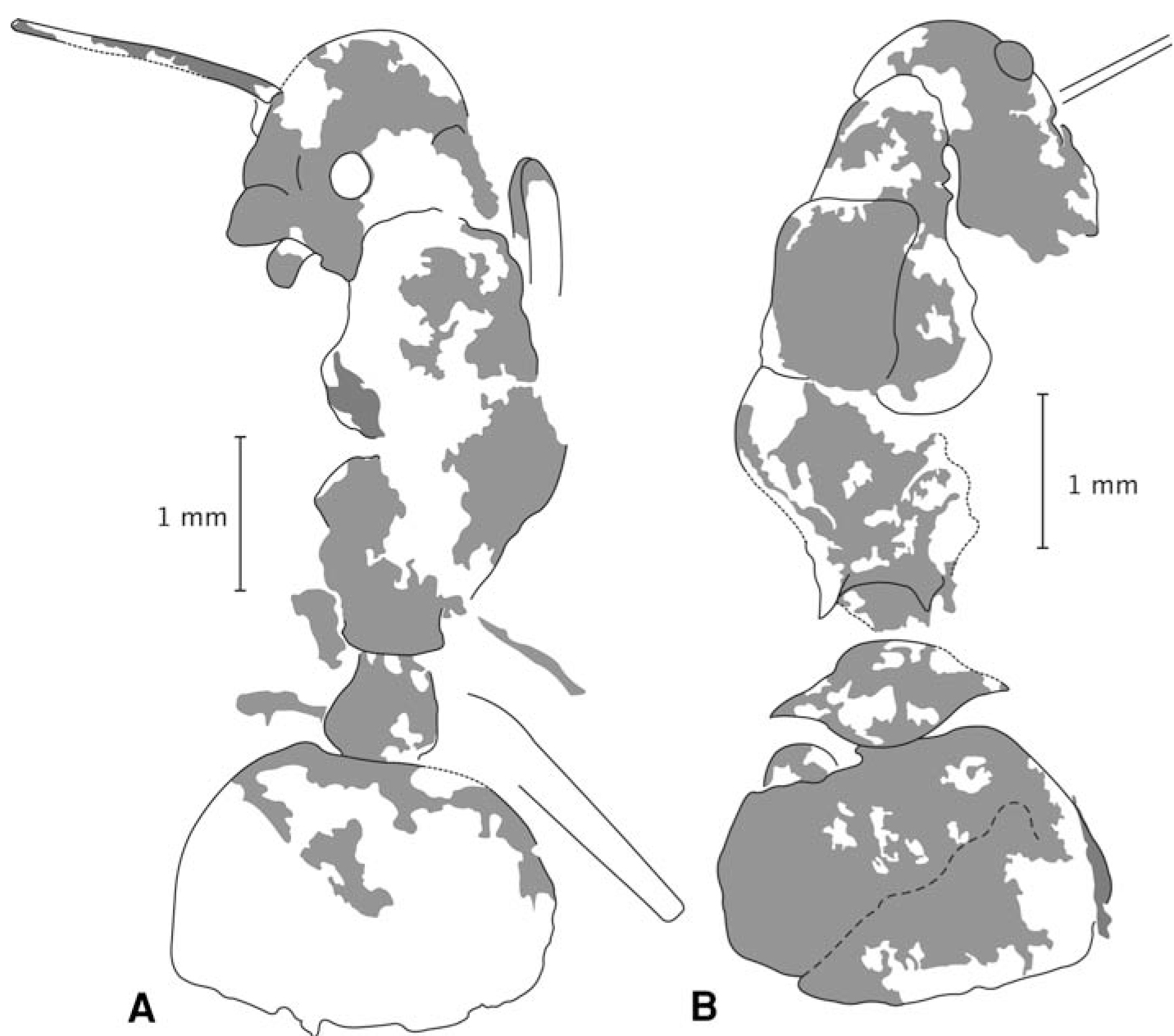
Fossil of P. annosa

== Unidentifiable ==
A number of species tentatively placed within the genus have subsequently been determined as unidentifiable to the species level, although they technically remain valid binomen.

- Polyrhachis eudora Smith, 1860
- Polyrhachis latreillii (Guérin-Méneville, 1838)

== See also ==
Shattuck, Steve, ed. (2011). "Polyrhachis". AntWiki. Steve Shattuck.
