= Polyrhachis lucidula =

Scientific classification
- Kingdom: Animalia
- Phylum: Arthropoda
- Clade: Pancrustacea
- Class: Insecta
- Order: Hymenoptera
- Family: Formicidae
- Subfamily: Formicinae
- Genus: Polyrhachis
- Subgenus: Myrmhopla
- Species: P. lucidula

Binomial name
- Polyrhachis lucidula Emery, 1893

Species of ant

Polyrhachis lucidula is a species of ant in the subfamily Formicinae, found in Cambodia, Myanmar, and China. It was formerly considered as a subspecies of Polyrhachis hippomanes.
