= Animal locomotion on the water surface =

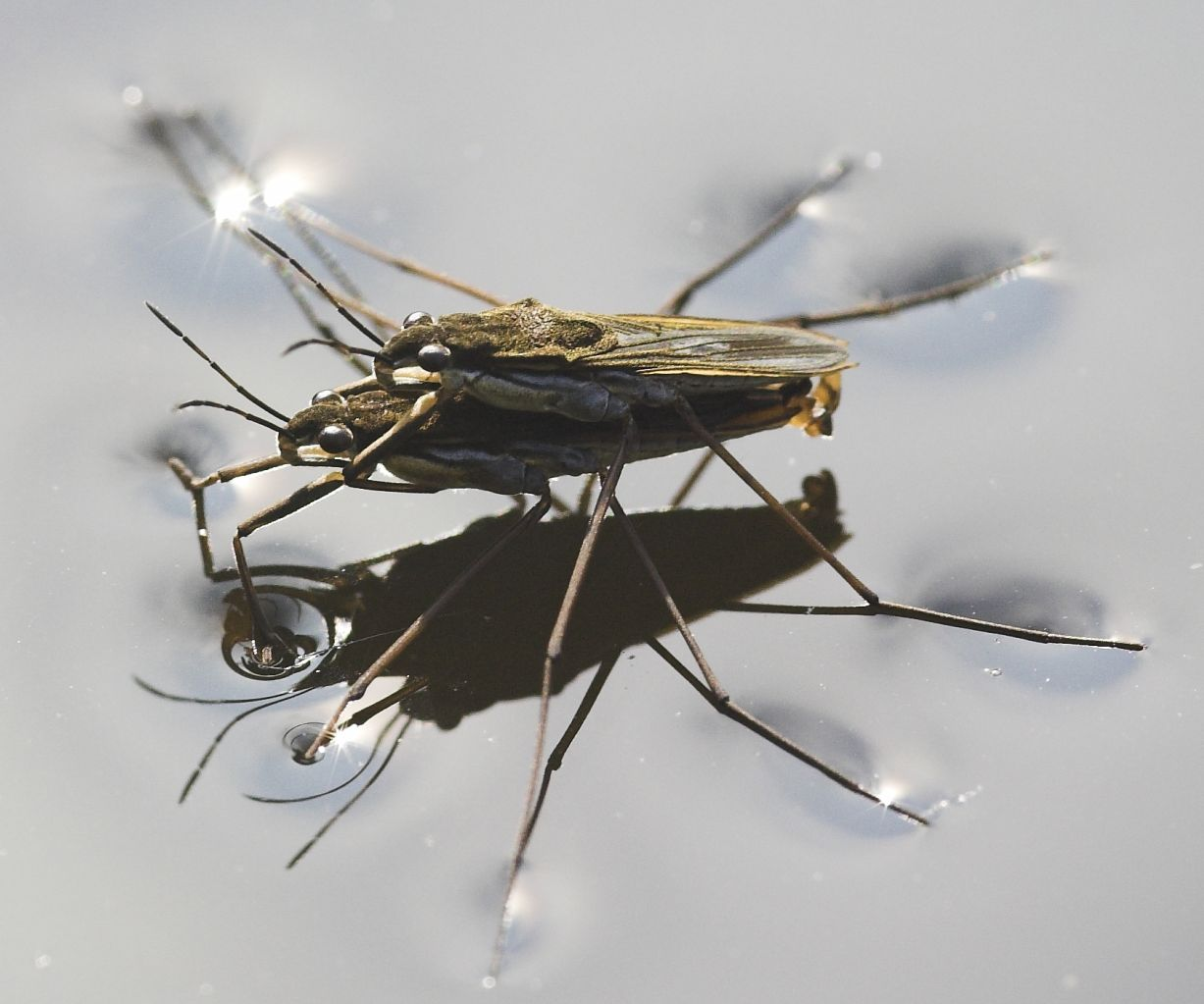
Water striders can move on the surface of water.

Animal locomotion on the surface layer of water is the study of animal locomotion in the case of small animals that live on the surface layer of water, relying on surface tension to stay afloat.

There are two types of animal locomotion on water, determined by the ratio of the animal's weight to the water's surface tension: those whose weight is supported by the surface tension at rest, and can therefore easily remain on the water's surface without much exertion, and those whose weight is not supported by the water's surface tension at rest, and must therefore exert additional motion in a direction parallel to the water's surface in order to remain above it. A creature such as the basilisk lizard, often dubbed the 'Jesus lizard', has a weight which is larger than the surface tension can support, and is widely known for running across the surface of water. Another example, the western grebe, performs a mating ritual that includes running across the surface of water.

Surface living animals such as the water strider typically have hydrophobic feet covered in small hairs that prevent the feet from breaking the surface and becoming wet. Another insect known to walk on the water surface is the ant species Polyrhachis sokolova. The pygmy gecko (Coleodactylus amazonicus), due to its small size and hydrophobic skin, is also able to walk on the water surface.

According to biophysicist David L. Hu, there are at least 342 species of water striders. As striders increase in size, their legs become proportionately longer, with Gigantometra gigas having a length of over 20 cm requiring a surface tension force of about 40 millinewtons.

Water striders generate thrust by shedding vortices in the water: a series of U-shaped vortex filaments is created during the power stroke. The two free ends of the "U" are attached to the water surface. These vortices transfer enough (backward) momentum to the water to propel the animal forwards (note that some momentum is transferred by capillary waves; see Denny's paradox for a more detailed discussion.)

== Meniscus climbing ==
To pass from the water surface to land, a water-walking insect must contend with the slope of the meniscus at the water's edge. Many such insects are unable to climb this meniscus using their usual propulsion mechanism.

David Hu and coworker John W. M. Bush have shown that such insects climb meniscuses by assuming a fixed body posture. This deforms the water surface and generates capillary forces that propels the insect up the slope without moving its appendages.

Hu and Bush conclude that meniscus climbing is an unusual means of propulsion in that the insect propels itself in a quasi-static configuration, without moving its appendages. Biolocomotion is generally characterized by the transfer of muscular strain energy to the kinetic and gravitational potential energy of the creature, and the kinetic energy of the suspending fluid. In contrast, meniscus climbing has a different energy pathway: by deforming the free surface, the insect converts muscular strain to the surface energy that powers its ascent.

== Marangoni propulsion ==
Many insects, including some terrestrial insects, can release a surfactant and propel themselves using the Marangoni effect. Hu and Bush report that Microvelia can attain a peak speed of 17 cm/s, which is twice its peak walking speed, using Marangoni propulsion.

Marangoni propulsion by a wetting arthropod is precisely analogous to a soap boat but the situation for insects such as water striders is more complex. Hu and Bush state that "for nonwetting arthropods, the transfer of chemical to kinetic energy is more subtle, as the Marangoni stress must be communicated across the creature’s complex surface layer".

== Sailing ==
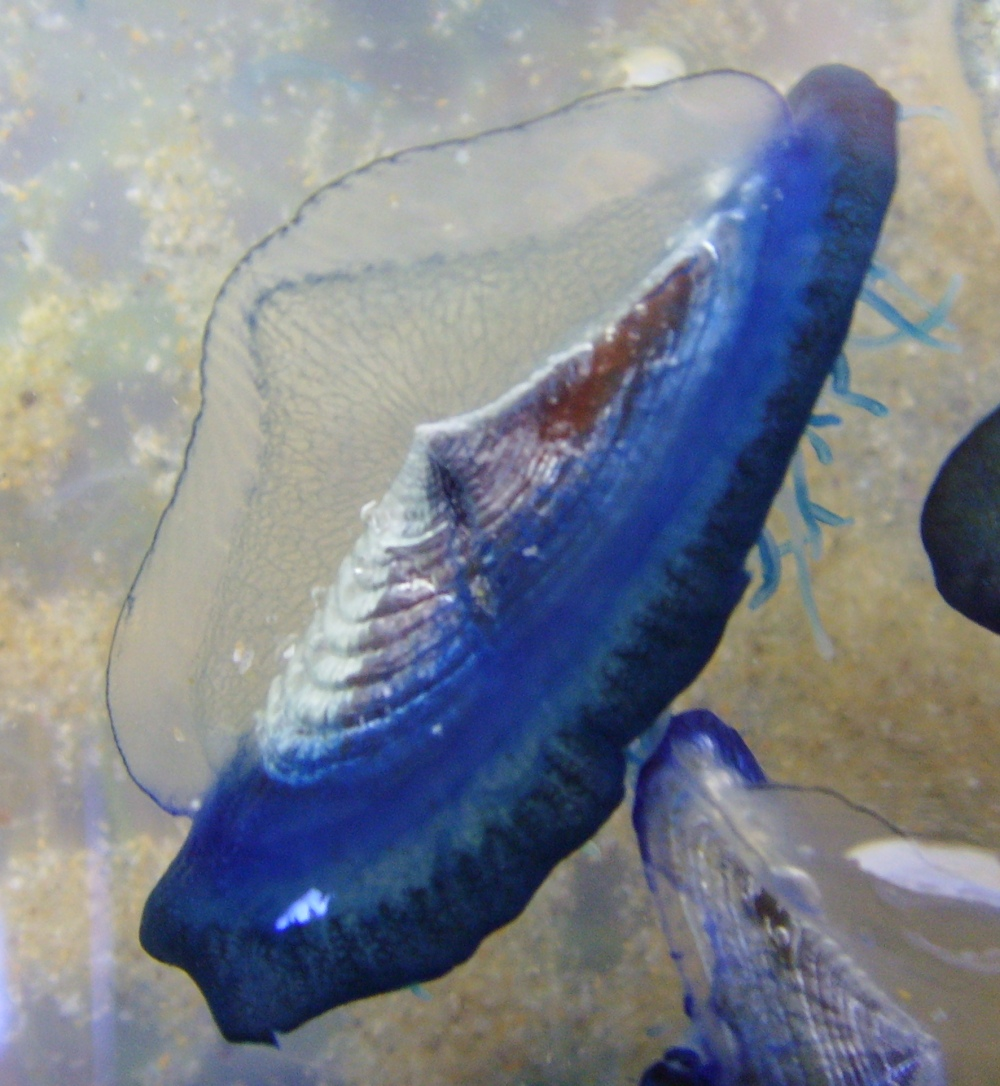
Velella moves by sailing.

Velella, the by-the-wind sailor, is a cnidarian with no means of propulsion other than sailing. A small rigid sail projects into the air and catches the wind. Velella sails always align along the direction of the wind where the sail may act as an aerofoil, so that the animals tend to sail downwind at a small angle to the wind.

== See also ==
- Robostrider
- Stone skipping
