= Goggia rupicola =

Conservation status
- Least Concern (IUCN 3.1)

Scientific classification
- Kingdom: Animalia
- Phylum: Chordata
- Class: Reptilia
- Order: Squamata
- Suborder: Gekkota
- Family: Gekkonidae
- Genus: Goggia
- Species: G. rupicola

Binomial name
- Goggia rupicola (FitzSimons, 1938)

Synonyms
- Phyllodactylus rupicolus; Phyllodactylus lineatus rupicolus

Species of lizard

Goggia rupicola, also known as the Namaqua dwarf leaf-toed gecko or the Namaqua pygmy gecko, is a southern African leaf-toed gecko first described by Vivian FitzSimons from a specimen collected on the 23 August 1937 where it was found in cracks of rocks of small outcrops in the arid Namakwaland in South Africa and Namibia.

== Name ==
Rupicolous refers to inhabiting rocks and stones.\\

== Description ==
On the dorsal (upper) sideG. rupicola is a dark greyish brown with pale salmon-coloured semicircular spots with a dark edge on the front arranged in more or less regular series down the back. A thin black streak runs from the nostril through the eye to just above ear-opening. The belly is a greyish white.

It is related to Goggia essexi from which it can be distinguished mainly by the dorsal and ventral scaling and the colour markings.

Dimensions: Body length about 30 mm, tail length 30 mm, head length 6 to 7 mm, head breadth 5.2 mm, forelimb 9 mm, hindlimb 12 mm.

== Reproduction ==
The three elliptical-shaped eggs originally collected in 1937 between Okiep and Springbok averaged 7.8 x 6.0 mm.
