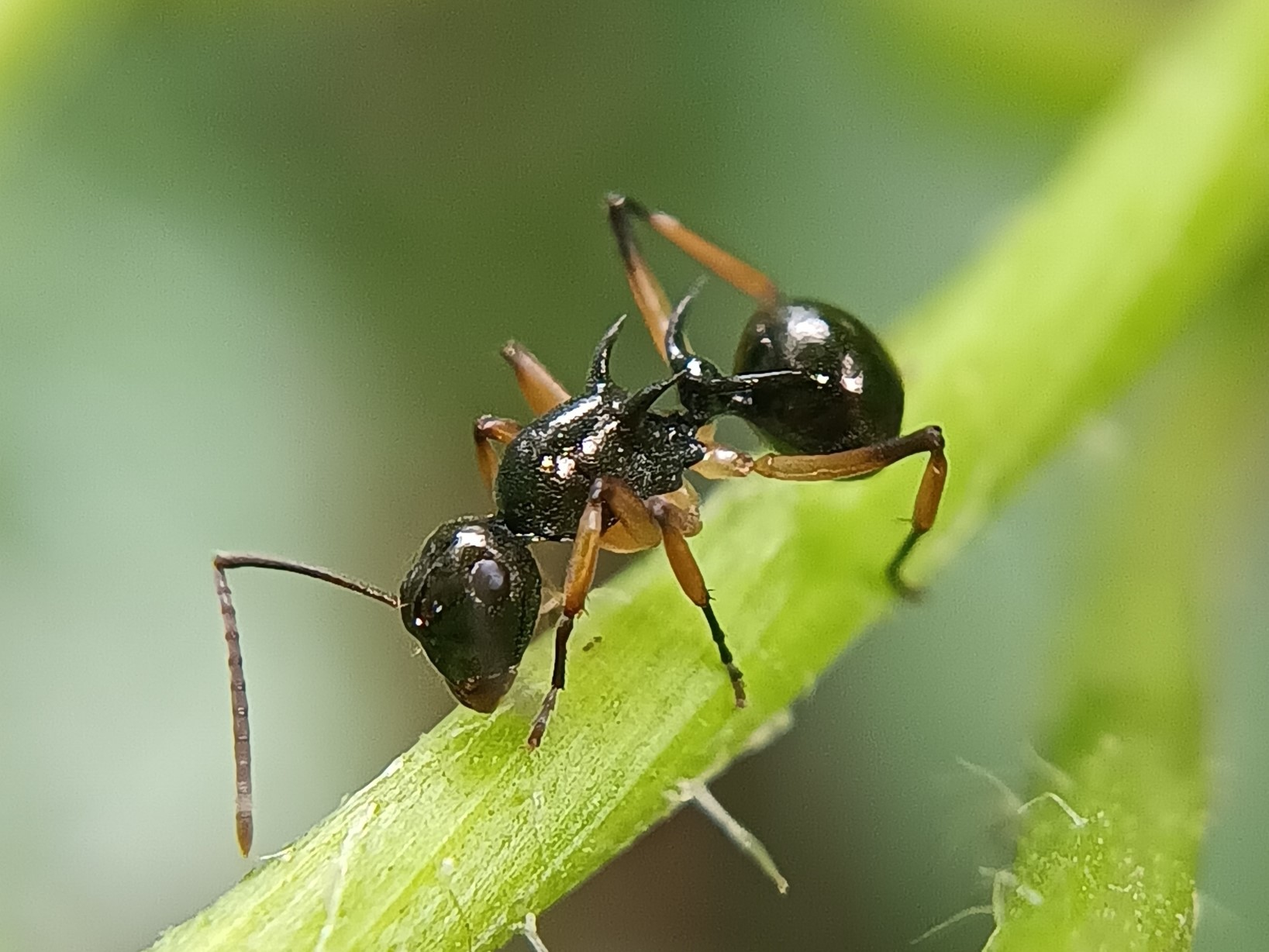

Scientific classification
- Kingdom: Animalia
- Phylum: Arthropoda
- Clade: Pancrustacea
- Class: Insecta
- Order: Hymenoptera
- Family: Formicidae
- Subfamily: Formicinae
- Genus: Polyrhachis
- Subgenus: Myrmhopla
- Species: P. follicula

Binomial name
- Polyrhachis follicula Menozzi, 1926

= Polyrhachis follicula =

Species of ant

Polyrhachis follicula is a species of ant native to the Philippines.

== Description ==
This species is a black ant with small reddish-brown mouthparts. It has four thornlike spurs on its abdomen, which is broken into three parts. The legs of this species are brownish.
