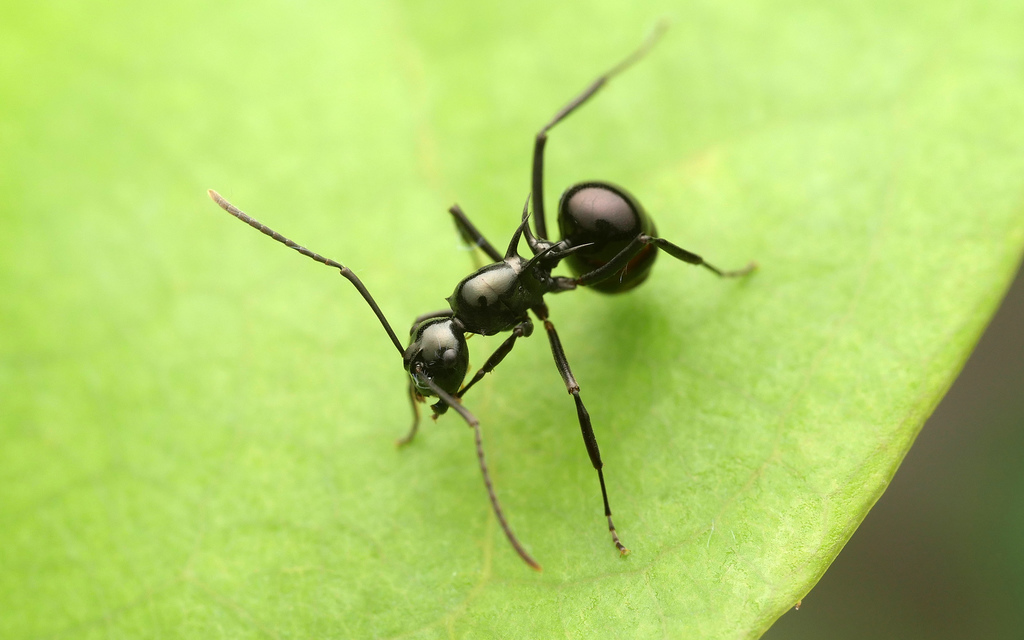

Scientific classification
- Kingdom: Animalia
- Phylum: Arthropoda
- Clade: Pancrustacea
- Class: Insecta
- Order: Hymenoptera
- Family: Formicidae
- Subfamily: Formicinae
- Genus: Polyrhachis
- Subgenus: Myrmhopla
- Species: P. mucronata

Binomial name
- Polyrhachis mucronata Smith 1859

= Polyrhachis mucronata =

Species of ant

Polyrhachis mucronata is a species of ant in the subfamily Formicinae native to Oceania and Southeast Asia.
