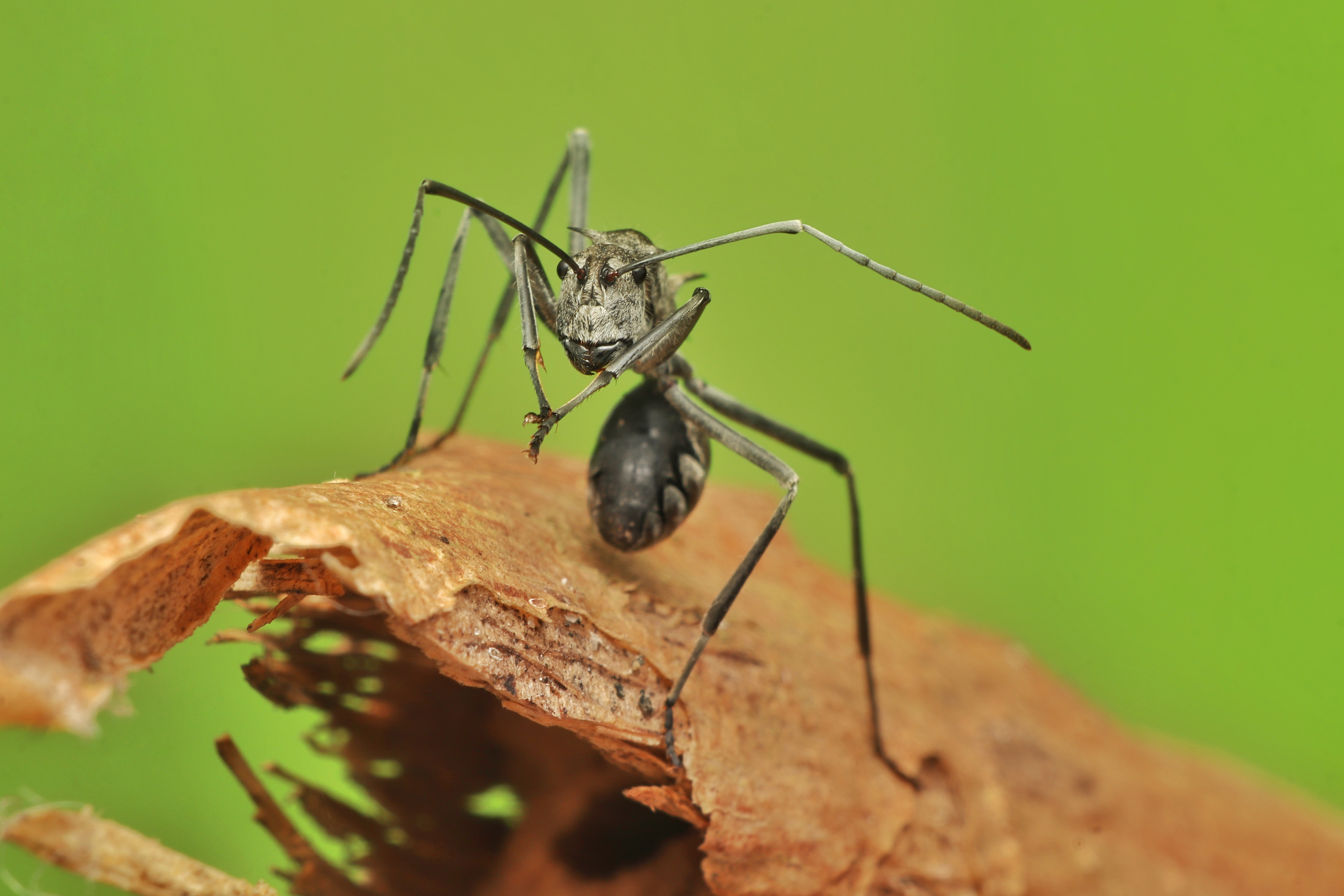

Scientific classification
- Kingdom: Animalia
- Phylum: Arthropoda
- Clade: Pancrustacea
- Class: Insecta
- Order: Hymenoptera
- Family: Formicidae
- Subfamily: Formicinae
- Genus: Polyrhachis
- Subgenus: Myrma
- Species: P. philippinensis

Binomial name
- Polyrhachis philippinensis Smith, F., 1858

= Polyrhachis philippinensis =

Species of ant

Polyrhachis philippinensis is a species of ant in the subfamily Formicinae that is endemic to the Philippines.

== References based on Global Ant Biodiversity Informatics ==
- Ashmead W. H. 1904. A list of the Hymenoptera of the Philippine Islands, with descriptions of new species. J. N. Y. Entomol. Soc. 12:1-22.
- Robson Simon Database Polyrhachis -05 Sept 2014
- Wheeler W. M. 1909. Ants of Formosa and the Philippines. Bulletin of the American Museum of Natural History 26: 333-345.
