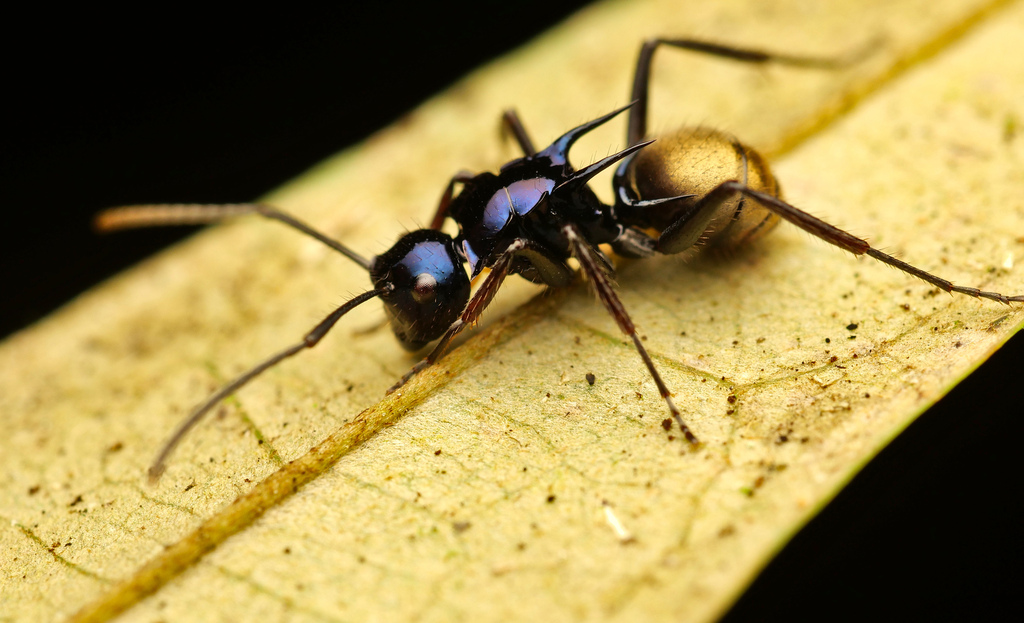

Scientific classification
- Kingdom: Animalia
- Phylum: Arthropoda
- Clade: Pancrustacea
- Class: Insecta
- Order: Hymenoptera
- Family: Formicidae
- Subfamily: Formicinae
- Genus: Polyrhachis
- Subgenus: Chariomyrma
- Species: P. loriai

Binomial name
- Polyrhachis loriai Forel, 1897

= Polyrhachis loriai =

Species of ant

Polyrhachis loriai is a species of ant belonging to the genus Polyrhachis and first described by Emery in 1897. This species is native to Papua Guinea.
