= Mark Denny =

American professor of biology (b.1951)

Mark W. Denny (born 1951) is a professor of biology at Stanford University. His research applies biomechanics, fluid dynamics, and probability to problems in marine ecology, particularly the physical constraints experienced by organisms living on wave-swept rocky shores.

His research on the intertidal zone of wave-swept shores has led to increased understanding of this habitat. His most publicized research is his work on locomotion of water striders, which led to the coining of the term "Denny's paradox" to explain a discrepancy between capillary-wave-based propulsion models and the observed performance of juvenile water striders.

In 2008 he examined greyhounds, thoroughbred horses and human athletes trying to find their maximum running speed. He predicted the fastest possible time for men's 100 metres will be 9.48 seconds. Denny has served on the editorial board of the Journal of Experimental Biology.

== Education and career ==
According to an American Scientist author biography, Denny received his bachelor's degree in zoology at Duke University, completed graduate studies at the University of British Columbia, and held postdoctoral positions at the University of Washington and the Smithsonian Tropical Research Institute. The same source places him at Stanford University and affiliated with Hopkins Marine Station in Pacific Grove, California.

== Books ==
Denny has authored or co-authored several books, including:

- Biology and the Mechanics of the Wave-Swept Environment (1988).
- Air and Water: The Biology and Physics of Life's Media (1993).
- Chance in Biology: Using Probability to Explore Nature (with Steven D. Gaines) (2000)..
- Conversations with Marco Polo: The Remarkable Life of Eugene C. Haderlie (with Joanna Lee Nelson) (2006).
- How the Ocean Works: An Introduction to Oceanography (2008).
- Ecological Mechanics: Principles of Life's Physical Interactions (published 2015; ©2016).

As editor:

- Encyclopedia of Tidepools and Rocky Shores (with Steven D. Gaines) (2007).
