= Polyrhachis convexa =

Scientific classification
- Kingdom: Animalia
- Phylum: Arthropoda
- Clade: Pancrustacea
- Class: Insecta
- Order: Hymenoptera
- Family: Formicidae
- Subfamily: Formicinae
- Genus: Polyrhachis
- Subgenus: Myrma
- Species: P. convexa

Binomial name
- Polyrhachis convexa Roger, 1863

Species of ant

Polyrhachis convexa is a species of ant in the subfamily Formicinae, found in India, Sri Lanka, and China.

== Subspecies ==
- Polyrhachis convexa convexa Roger, 1863
- Polyrhachis convexa isabellae Forel, 1908
