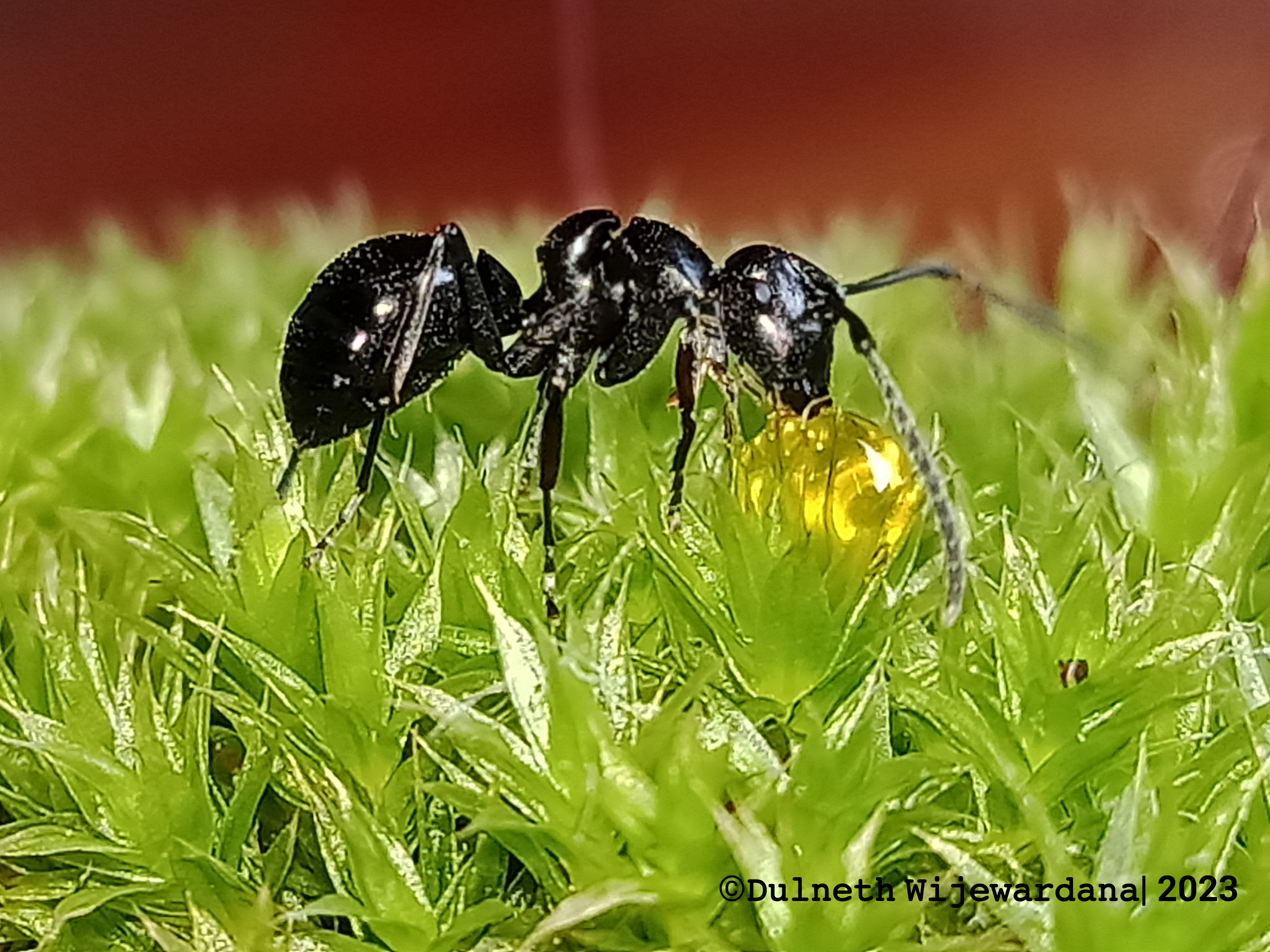

Scientific classification
- Kingdom: Animalia
- Phylum: Arthropoda
- Clade: Pancrustacea
- Class: Insecta
- Order: Hymenoptera
- Family: Formicidae
- Subfamily: Formicinae
- Genus: Polyrhachis
- Subgenus: Hemioptica
- Species: P. scissa

Binomial name
- Polyrhachis scissa (Roger, 1862)

= Polyrhachis scissa =

Species of ant

Polyrhachis scissa is a species of ant in the subfamily Formicinae, found in Sri Lanka, and southern India.
