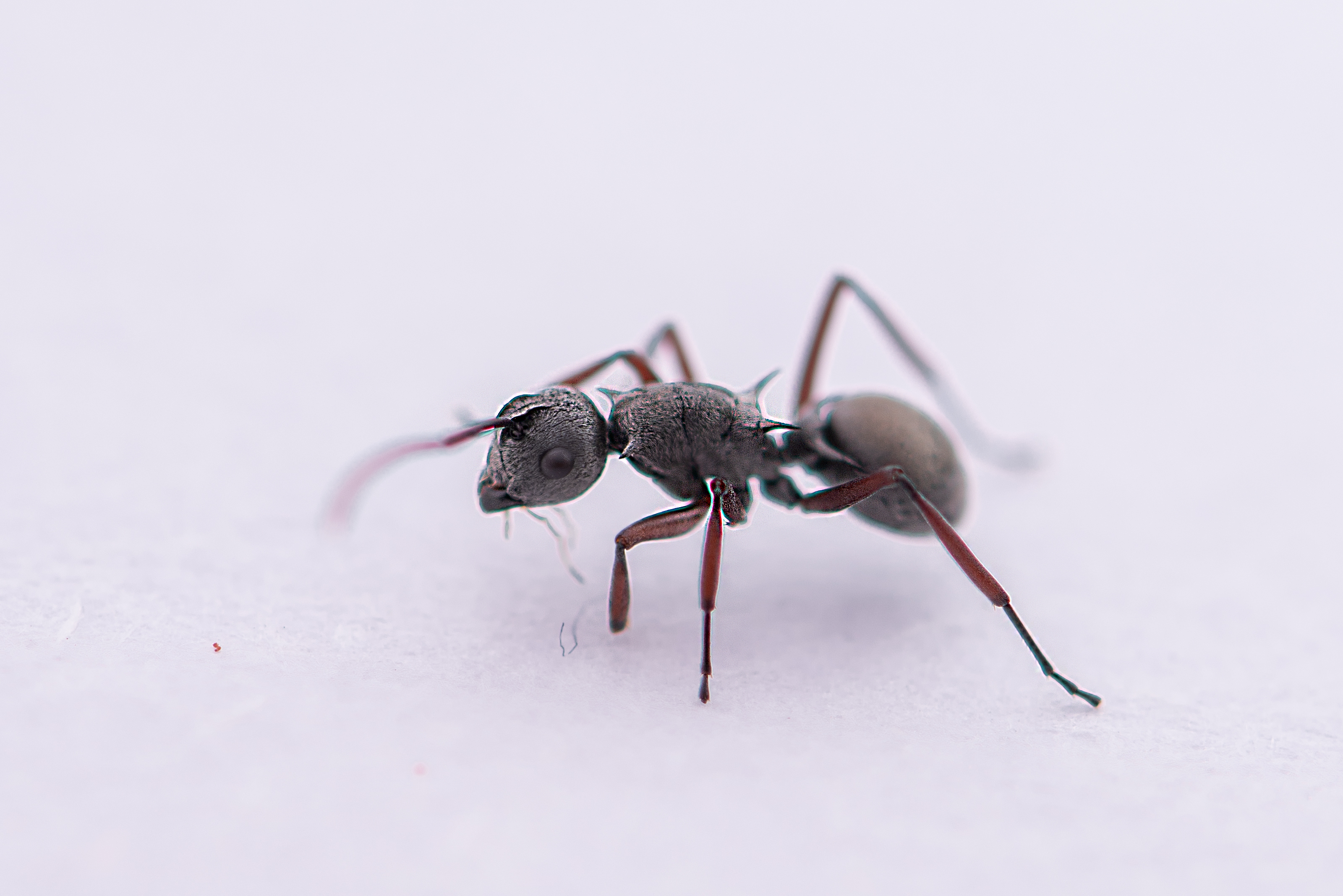

Scientific classification
- Kingdom: Animalia
- Phylum: Arthropoda
- Clade: Pancrustacea
- Class: Insecta
- Order: Hymenoptera
- Family: Formicidae
- Subfamily: Formicinae
- Genus: Polyrhachis
- Subgenus: Myrmhopla
- Species: P. tibialis

Binomial name
- Polyrhachis tibialis Smith, F., 1858

= Polyrhachis tibialis =

Species of ant

Polyrhachis tibialis is a species of ant in the subfamily Formicinae, found in many Asian countries. There are 10 subspecies recognized.

== Subspecies ==
- Polyrhachis tibialis addax Santschi, 1928 – Indonesia
- Polyrhachis tibialis caligata Emery, 1895 – Indonesia, Bangladesh, Myanmar, Vietnam,
- Polyrhachis tibialis completa Santschi, 1928 – Indonesia
- Polyrhachis tibialis crassisquama Forel, 1913 – Malaysia
- Polyrhachis tibialis nigricornis Santschi, 1928 – Indonesia
- Polyrhachis tibialis orientalis Karavaiev, 1927 – Indonesia
- Polyrhachis tibialis parsis Emery, 1900 – India, Singapore
- Polyrhachis tibialis pectita Santschi, 1928 – Sri Lanka
- Polyrhachis tibialis robustior Karavaiev, 1927 – Indonesia
- Polyrhachis tibialis tibialis Smith, F., 1858 – Borneo, Bangladesh, Myanmar, Thailand, China
