= Goggia gemmula =

Conservation status
- Least Concern (IUCN 3.1)

Scientific classification
- Kingdom: Animalia
- Phylum: Chordata
- Class: Reptilia
- Order: Squamata
- Suborder: Gekkota
- Family: Gekkonidae
- Genus: Goggia
- Species: G. gemmula

Binomial name
- Goggia gemmula (Bauer, Branch & Good, 1996)
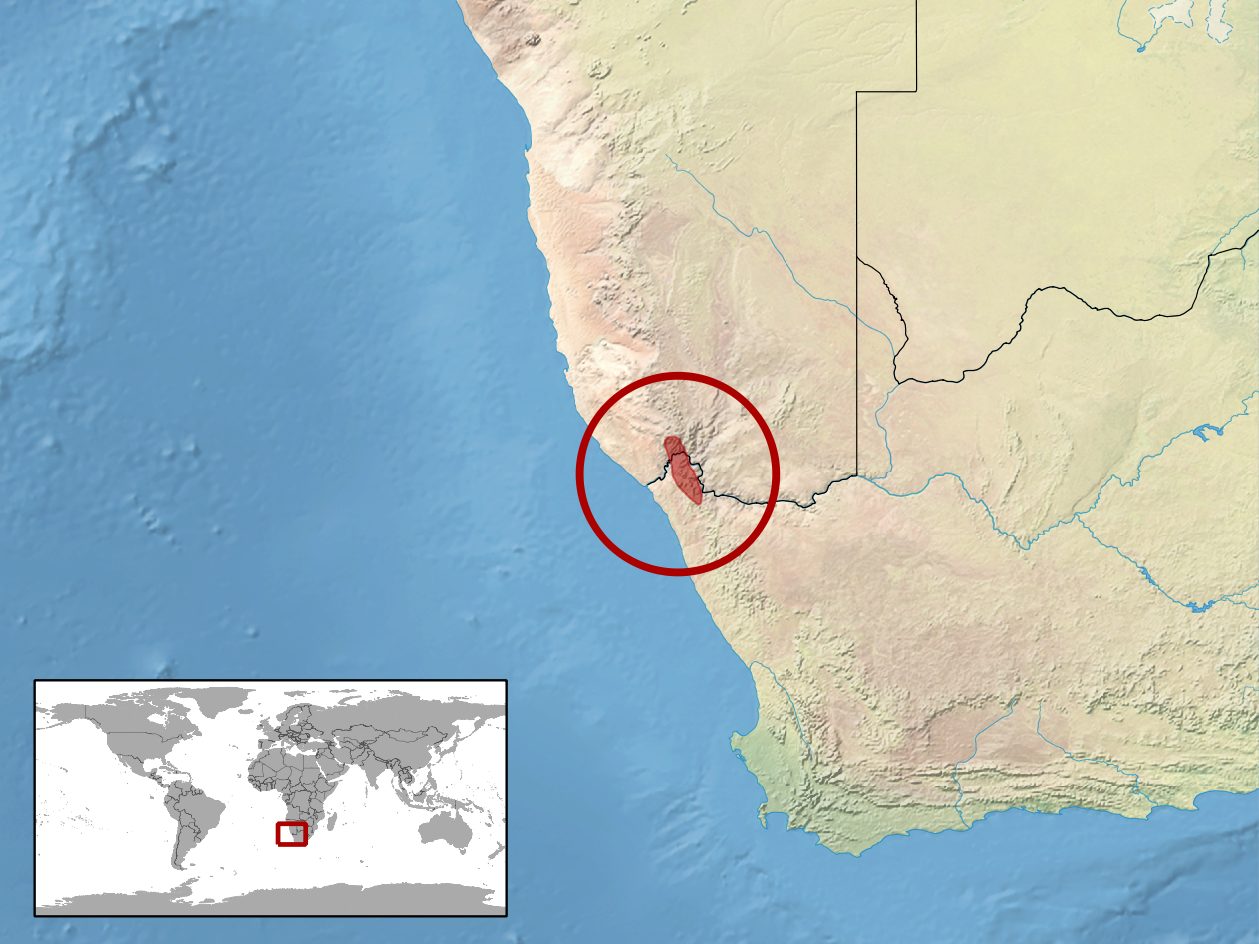

Synonyms
- Phyllodactylus gemmulus

Species of lizard

Goggia gemmula, also known as the Richtersveld dwarf leaf-toed gecko or the Richtersveld pygmy gecko, is a species of gecko. It is found in South Africa and Namibia.
