= Goggia braacki =

Conservation status
- Least Concern (IUCN 3.1)

Scientific classification
- Kingdom: Animalia
- Phylum: Chordata
- Class: Reptilia
- Order: Squamata
- Suborder: Gekkota
- Family: Gekkonidae
- Genus: Goggia
- Species: G. braacki

Binomial name
- Goggia braacki (Good, Bauer & Branch, 1996)

Synonyms
- Phyllodactylus braacki Good, Bauer & Branch, 1996; Goggia braacki — Bauer, Good & Branch, 1997

Species of lizard

Goggia braacki, also known commonly as Braack's dwarf leaf-toed gecko, Braack's pygmy gecko, and the Karoo leaf-toed gecko, is a species of lizard in the family Gekkonidae. The species is endemic to South Africa.

== Etymology ==
The specific name, braacki, is in honor of South African herpetologist Harold H. Braack.

== Habitat ==
The preferred natural habitat of G. braacki is rocky areas of montane grassland.

== Description ==
Adults of G. braacki have a snout-to-vent length (SVL) of 2.7–3.5 cm (1.1–1.4 in).

== Reproduction ==
G. braacki is oviparous.
