= Goggia hexapora =

Conservation status
- Least Concern (IUCN 3.1)

Scientific classification
- Kingdom: Animalia
- Phylum: Chordata
- Class: Reptilia
- Order: Squamata
- Suborder: Gekkota
- Family: Gekkonidae
- Genus: Goggia
- Species: G. hexapora

Binomial name
- Goggia hexapora (Bauer, Branch & Good, 1995)
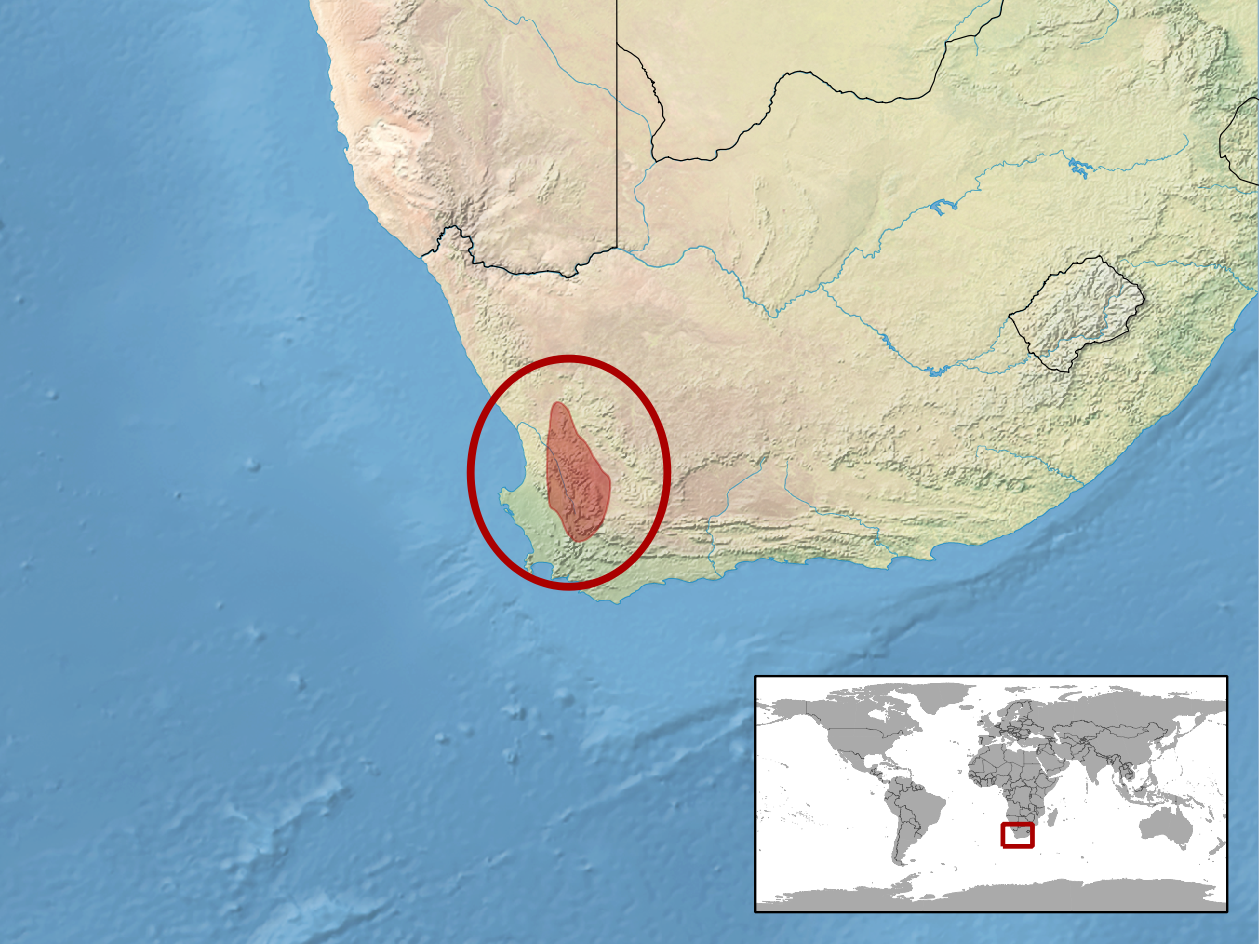

Synonyms
- Phyllodactylus hexaporus

Species of lizard

Goggia hexapora, also known as the Cedarberg dwarf leaf-toed gecko or Cedarberg pygmy gecko, is a species of gecko. It is found in South Africa.
