= Polyrhachis nigra =

Scientific classification
- Kingdom: Animalia
- Phylum: Arthropoda
- Clade: Pancrustacea
- Class: Insecta
- Order: Hymenoptera
- Family: Formicidae
- Subfamily: Formicinae
- Genus: Polyrhachis
- Subgenus: Myrma
- Species: P. nigra

Binomial name
- Polyrhachis nigra Mayr, 1862

Species of ant

Polyrhachis nigra is a species of ant in the subfamily Formicinae. It is endemic to Sri Lanka.
