= Goggia hewitti =

Conservation status
- Least Concern (IUCN 3.1)

Scientific classification
- Kingdom: Animalia
- Phylum: Chordata
- Class: Reptilia
- Order: Squamata
- Suborder: Gekkota
- Family: Gekkonidae
- Genus: Goggia
- Species: G. hewitti

Binomial name
- Goggia hewitti (Branch, Bauer & Good, 1995)

Synonyms
- Phyllodactylus hewitti Branch, Bauer & Good, 1995; Goggia hewitti — Bauer, Good & Branch, 1997

Species of lizard

Goggia hewitti, known commonly as Hewitt's dwarf leaf-toed gecko, Hewitt's leaf-toed gecko, or Hewitt's pygmy gecko, is a species of gecko, a lizard in the family Gekkonidae. The species is endemic to South Africa.

== Etymology ==
The specific name, hewitti, is in honor of British-born South African herpetologist John Hewitt.

== Description ==
G. hewitti may attain a snout-to-vent length (SVL) of 28–35 mm (1.1–1.4 in). The tail, if original, is slightly longer than the SVL, but shorter if regenerated. The dorsum of the body is light brown with darker brown markings, and the venter is pale cream. Males have four preanal pores.

== Reproduction ==
G. hewitti is oviparous. The eggs, which measure 9 mm × 5.5 mm (0.35 in × 0.22 in), are laid under rock flakes. Clutch size is two.
