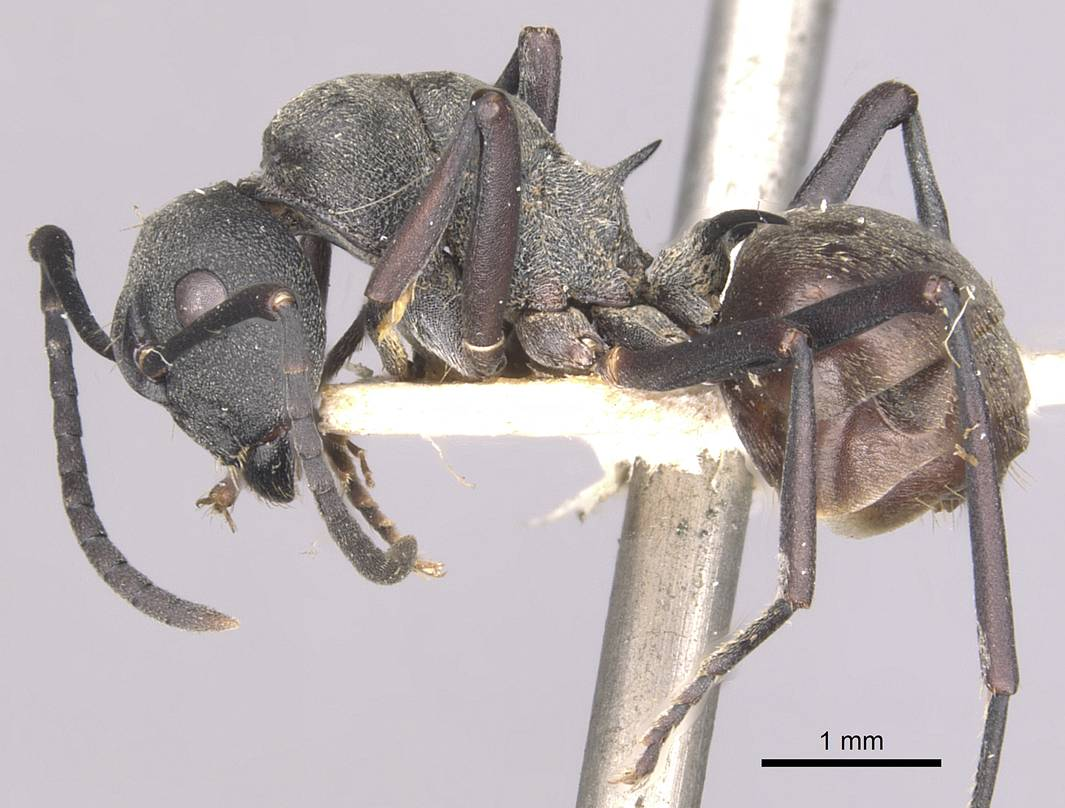

Scientific classification
- Kingdom: Animalia
- Phylum: Arthropoda
- Clade: Pancrustacea
- Class: Insecta
- Order: Hymenoptera
- Family: Formicidae
- Subfamily: Formicinae
- Genus: Polyrhachis
- Subgenus: Myrmhopla
- Species: P. sophocles

Binomial name
- Polyrhachis sophocles Forel, 1908

= Polyrhachis sophocles =

Species of ant in Sri Lanka

Polyrhachis sophocles is a species of ant in the subfamily Formicinae. It is endemic to Sri Lanka.

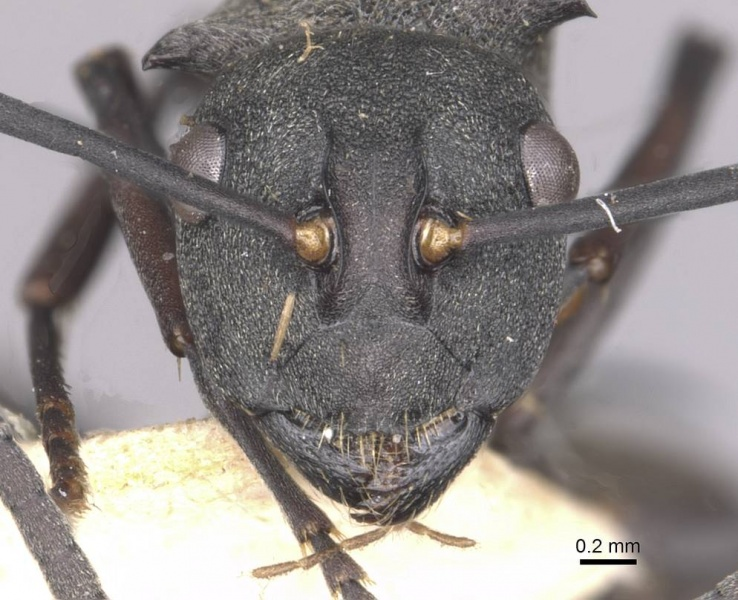
Head view of specimen
