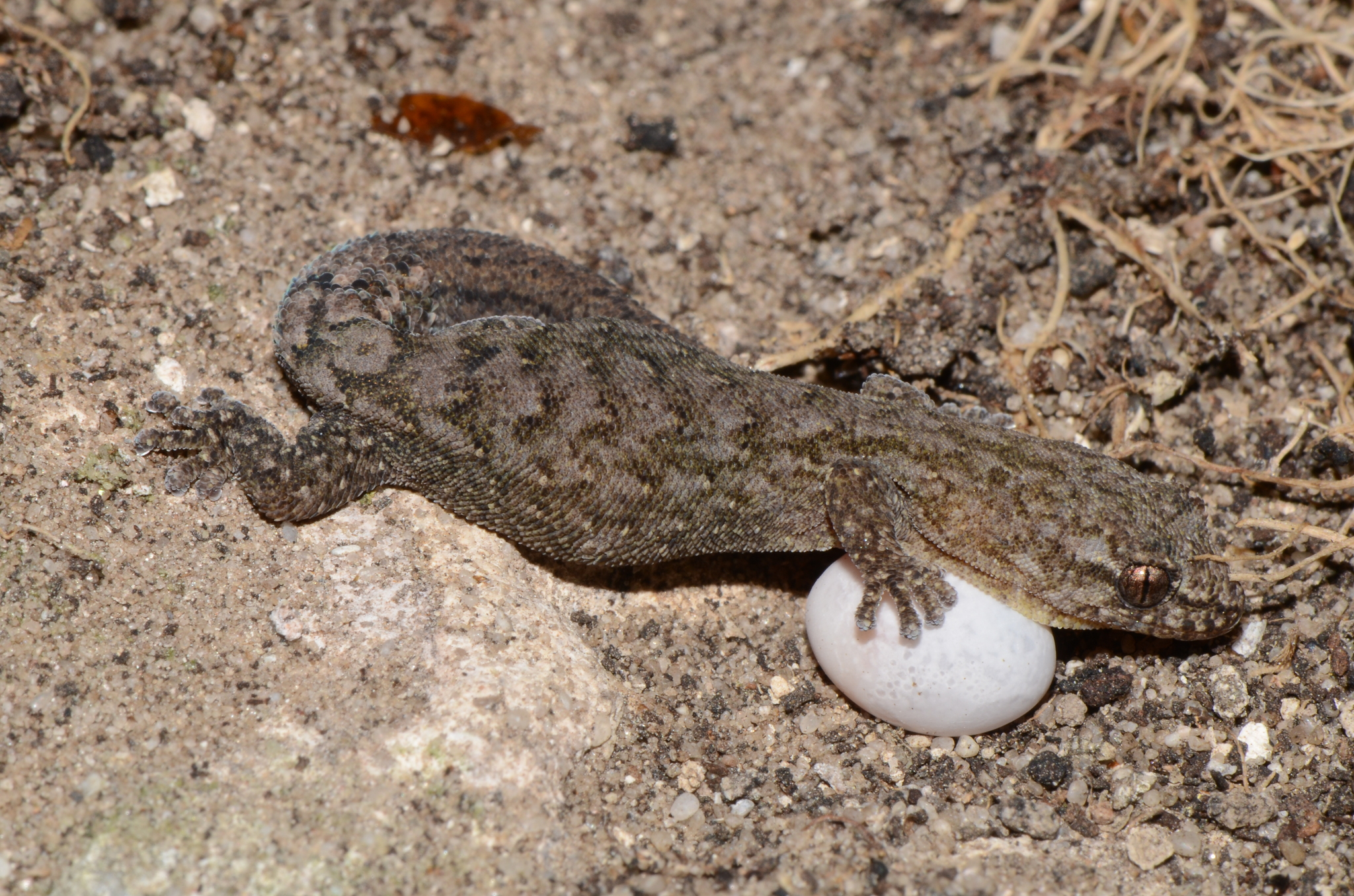

Scientific classification
- Kingdom: Animalia
- Phylum: Chordata
- Class: Reptilia
- Order: Squamata
- Suborder: Gekkota
- Family: Gekkonidae
- Genus: Goggia
- Species: G. incognita

Binomial name
- Goggia incognita Heinicke, Turk, & Bauer, 2017

= Goggia incognita =

Species of lizard

Goggia incognita is a species of gecko. It is endemic to the Western Cape, South Africa.
