= Polyrhachis xanthippe =

Scientific classification
- Kingdom: Animalia
- Phylum: Arthropoda
- Clade: Pancrustacea
- Class: Insecta
- Order: Hymenoptera
- Family: Formicidae
- Subfamily: Formicinae
- Genus: Polyrhachis
- Subgenus: Myrmhopla
- Species: P. xanthippe

Binomial name
- Polyrhachis xanthippe Forel, 1911

Species of ant

Polyrhachis xanthippe is a species of ant in the subfamily Formicinae. It is endemic to Sri Lanka.
