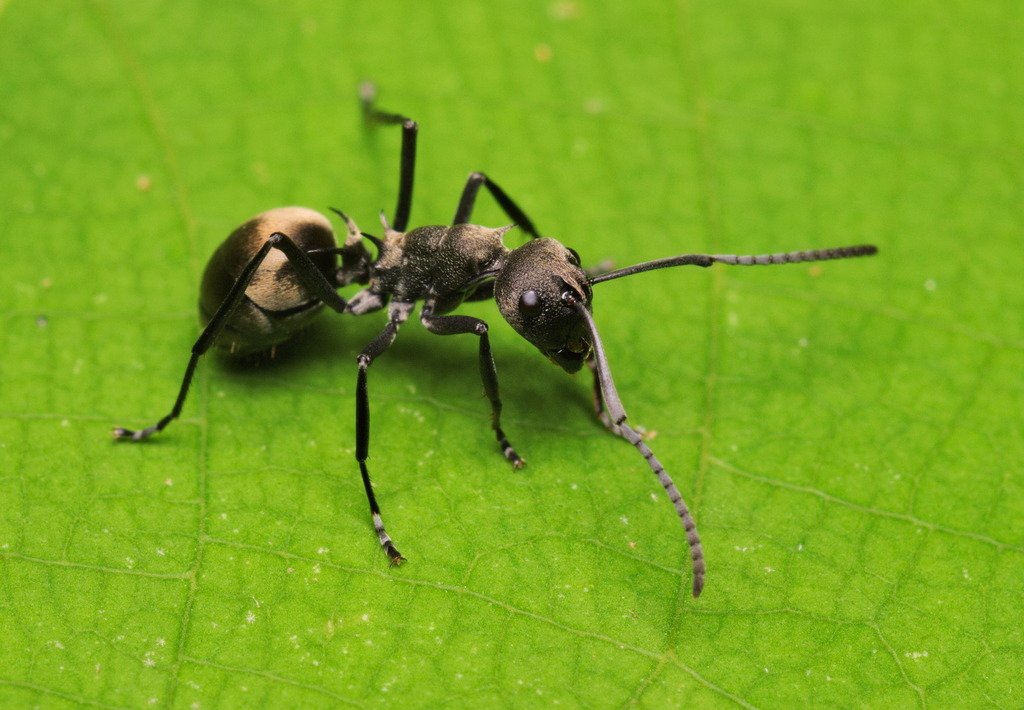

Scientific classification
- Kingdom: Animalia
- Phylum: Arthropoda
- Clade: Pancrustacea
- Class: Insecta
- Order: Hymenoptera
- Family: Formicidae
- Subfamily: Formicinae
- Genus: Polyrhachis
- Subgenus: Myrmhopla
- Species: P. dives

Binomial name
- Polyrhachis dives Smith, 1857

= Polyrhachis dives =

Species of ant

Polyrhachis dives is a wide-ranging species of ant from southern Asia and the Northern Territory of Australia.

== Identification ==
Throughout its wide distribution, P. dives is a morphologically stable species with only a few, insignificant differences between individuals, even those from far away locations. However, Southeast Asian specimens generally have a more deeply notched anterior clypeal margin and eyes that only rarely exceed the lateral cephalic outline. Most also have the tips of the propodeal spines more distinctly curved outwards, and longer petiolar spines that are somewhat curved downwards from their midlength. In contrast, the anterior clypeal margin in Australian and New Guinean specimens is only shallowly emarginated and the eyes exceed the lateral cephalic outline. The propodeal spines are only weakly curved outwards and the petiolar spines are slightly shorter and less curved.

== Biology ==
In Australia, P. dives are known from two isolated populations, one in the Northern Territory and the other in northern Queensland. It prefers mostly open savannah woodlands and swampy coastal plains, where it builds its silk and/or carton-based, relatively large, and usually has many nests between the branches and leaves of shrubs.

In Japan, as it is smaller than Polyrhachis lamellidens, P. dives is also more timid. It nests in the trees, using larval silk to stitch leaves together. Nests are highly polygynous. It is common in rural and agricultural areas of Okinawa and is well known to those who encounter it because of its strong and painful bite. In the past, it was rare in northern parts of the island and has recently extended its range northward or has become much more common. The reason for this expansion or increase in population size is unknown.

=== Parasites ===
- This species is a host for the eucharitid wasp Stilbula polyrhachicida (a parasite).
- This species is also a host for the eucharitid wasp Stilbuloida doddi.
- This species is parasitized by the fungus Ophiocordyceps unilateralis.
