= Goggia microlepidota =

Conservation status
- Least Concern (IUCN 3.1)

Scientific classification
- Kingdom: Animalia
- Phylum: Chordata
- Class: Reptilia
- Order: Squamata
- Suborder: Gekkota
- Family: Gekkonidae
- Genus: Goggia
- Species: G. microlepidota

Binomial name
- Goggia microlepidota (V. Fitzsimons, 1939)

Synonyms
- Phyllodactylus microlepidotus V. Fitzsimons, 1939; Goggia microlepidota — Bauer, Good & Branch, 1997

Species of lizard

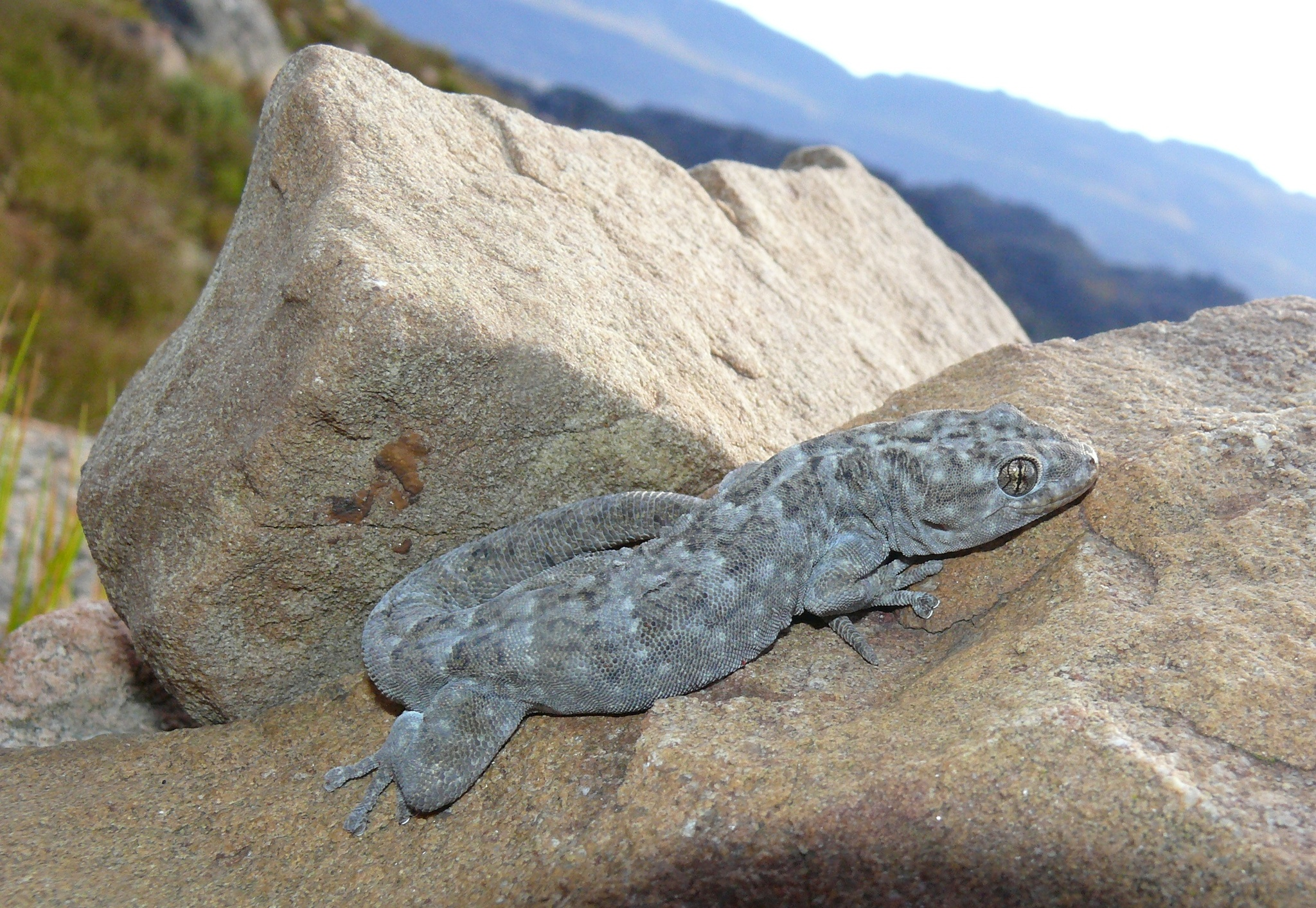
Goggia microlepidota

Goggia microlepidota, also known as the small-scaled dwarf leaf-toed gecko, small-scaled leaf-toed gecko, or small-scaled gecko, is a species of lizard in the Gekkonidae family. It is endemic to South Africa.
