= Goggia matzikamaensis =

Scientific classification
- Kingdom: Animalia
- Phylum: Chordata
- Class: Reptilia
- Order: Squamata
- Suborder: Gekkota
- Family: Gekkonidae
- Genus: Goggia
- Species: G. matzikamaensis

Binomial name
- Goggia matzikamaensis Heinicke, Turk, & Bauer, 2017

Species of lizard

Goggia matzikamaensis is a species of gecko. It is found in South Africa.
