= Robostrider =

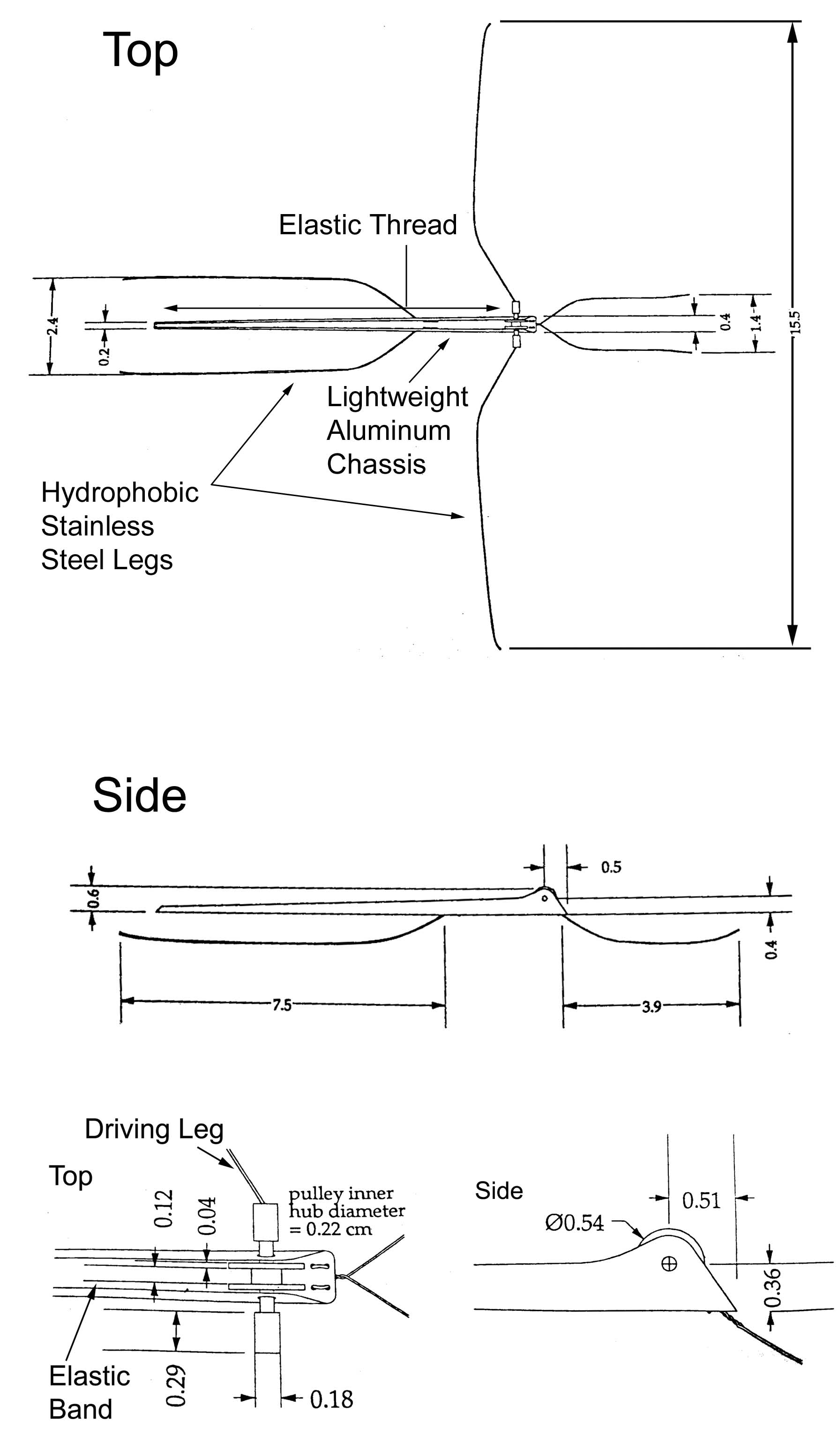
Schematic diagram of robostrider

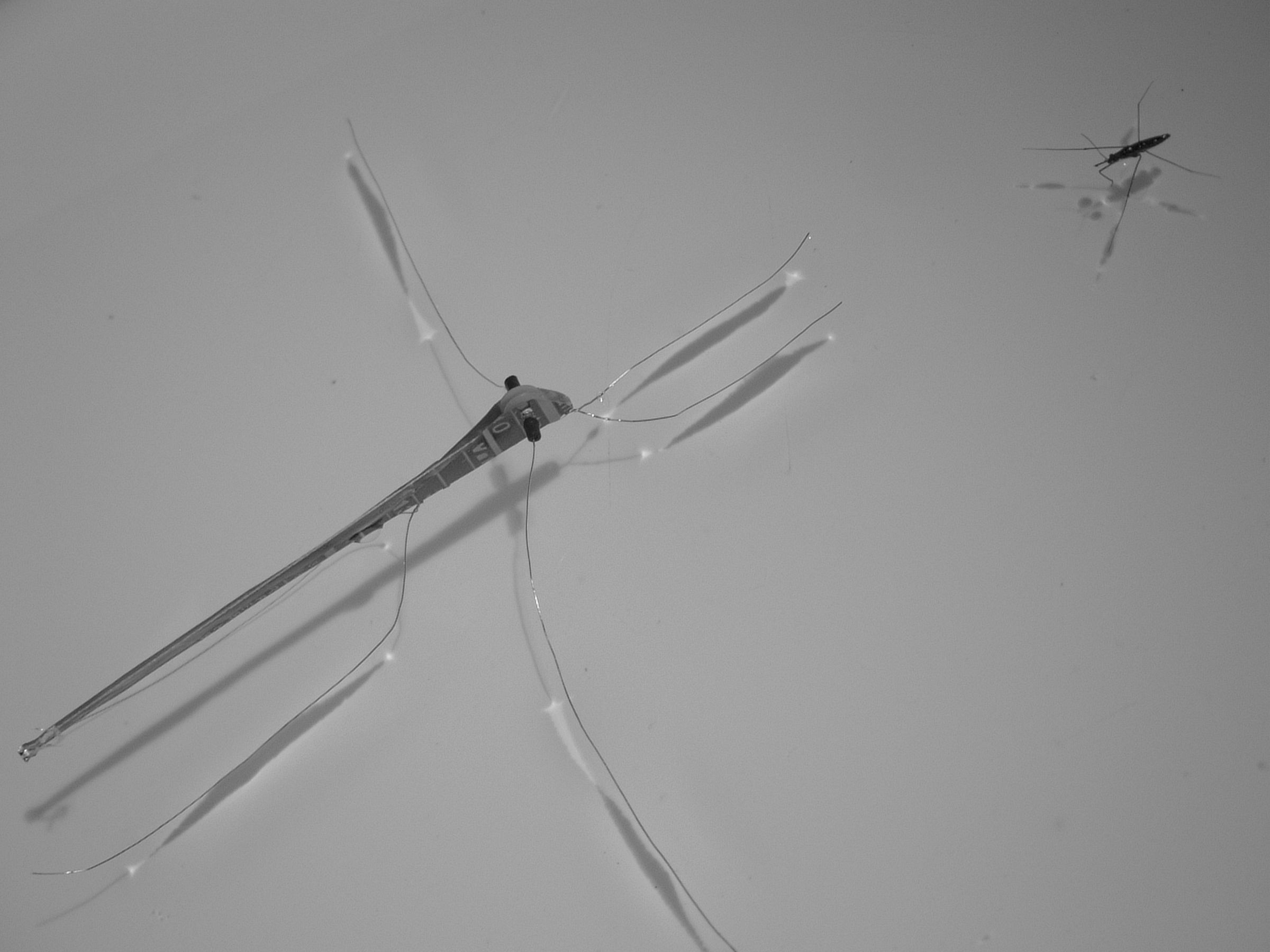
Robostrider faces its biological counterpart

Robostrider is a self-propelled robot which uses similar mechanisms to real water striders in order to glide along the surface of the water. It was developed at Cambridge, Massachusetts.

Robostrider does not break the surface layer of the water despite leg speeds of 18 centimetres per second (7.1 in/s) it generates both capillary waves and vortices while in motion, as do Gerridae. Hu and Bush state that Robostrider moves "in a style less elegant than its natural counterpart" but point out that it can cover 20 centimetres (7.9 in) in five strides, with one winding.

== See also ==
- Animal locomotion on the surface layer of water.
