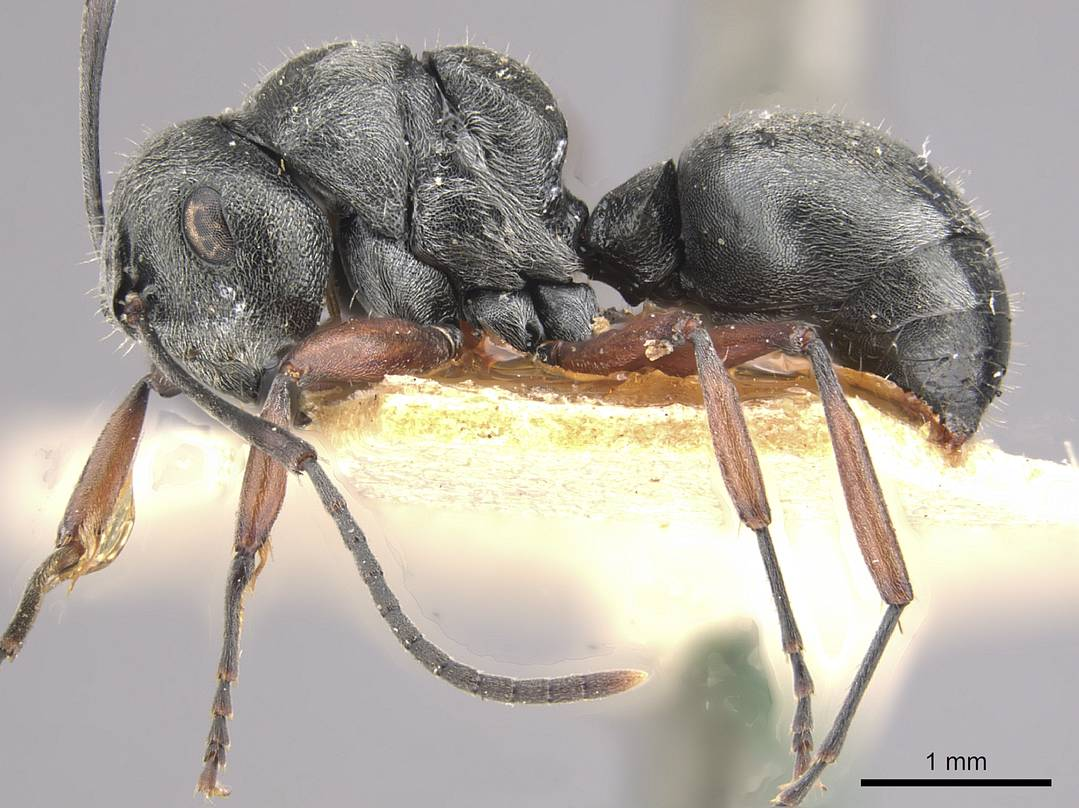

Scientific classification
- Kingdom: Animalia
- Phylum: Arthropoda
- Clade: Pancrustacea
- Class: Insecta
- Order: Hymenoptera
- Family: Formicidae
- Subfamily: Formicinae
- Genus: Polyrhachis
- Subgenus: Hemioptica
- Species: P. bugnioni

Binomial name
- Polyrhachis bugnioni Forel, 1908

= Polyrhachis bugnioni =

Species of ant

Polyrhachis bugnioni is a species of ant in the subfamily Formicinae, found in Sri Lanka.
