= Polyrhachis curvispina =

Scientific classification
- Kingdom: Animalia
- Phylum: Arthropoda
- Clade: Pancrustacea
- Class: Insecta
- Order: Hymenoptera
- Family: Formicidae
- Subfamily: Formicinae
- Genus: Polyrhachis
- Subgenus: Myrmhopla
- Species: P. curvispina

Binomial name
- Polyrhachis curvispina Forel, 1908

Species of ant

Polyrhachis curvispina is a species of ant in the subfamily Formicinae, found in Sri Lanka.
