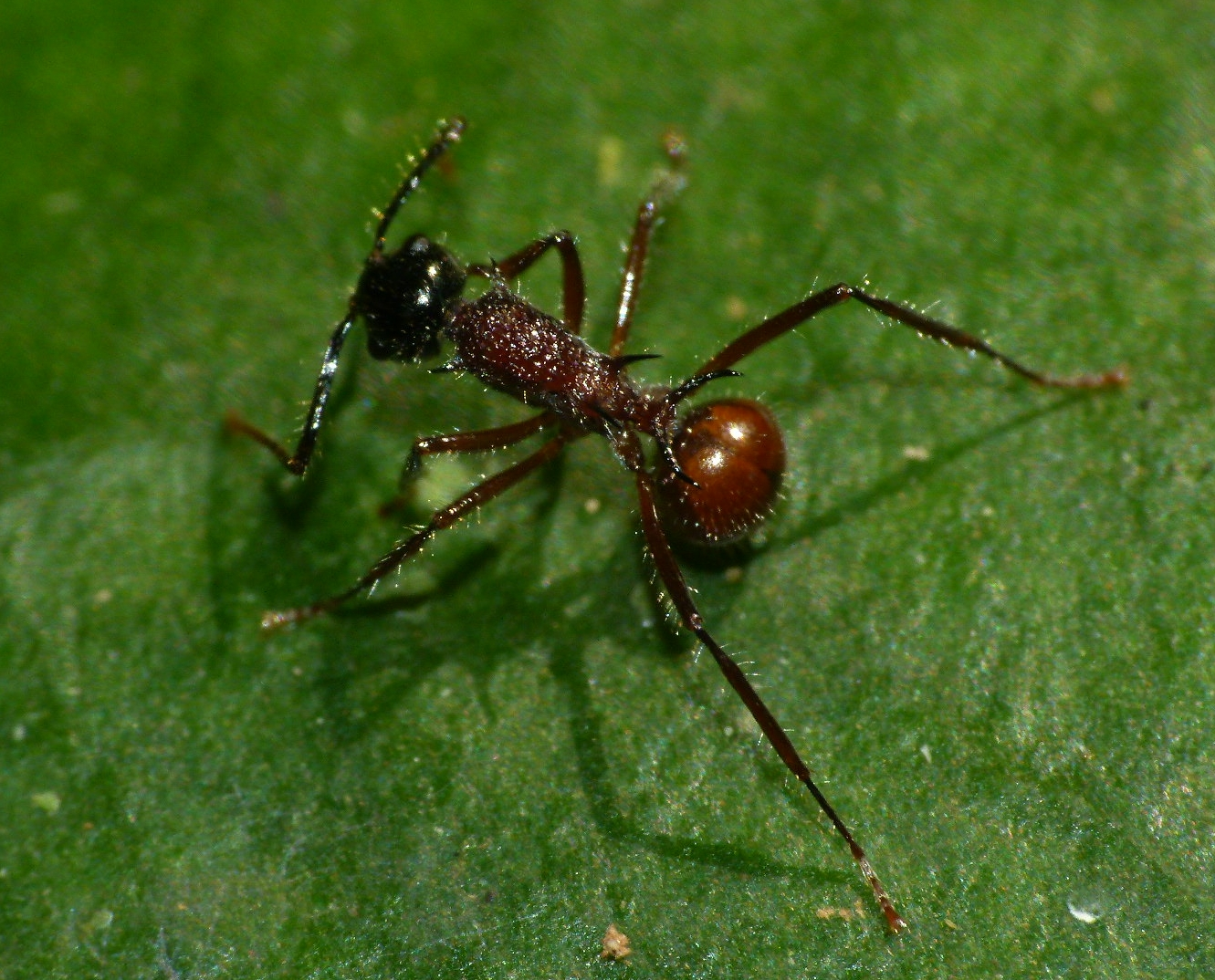
- A worker (from the Western Ghats)

Scientific classification
- Kingdom: Animalia
- Phylum: Arthropoda
- Clade: Pancrustacea
- Class: Insecta
- Order: Hymenoptera
- Family: Formicidae
- Subfamily: Formicinae
- Genus: Polyrhachis
- Subgenus: Myrmhopla
- Species: P. gracilior

Binomial name
- Polyrhachis gracilior Forel, 1893

= Polyrhachis gracilior =

Species of ant

Polyrhachis gracilior is a species of ant found in the southwest and northeast India. It is one of the few ants that build arboreal nests made of leaves stitched together using silk produced by their larvae.

Originally described as a "race" of Polyrhachis furcata, it was elevated to a full species by C T Bingham who noted differences in the shape of the spines. A species described from Travancore as weberi by Horace Donisthorpe in 1943, was identified as being identical to gracilior by Barry Bolton.

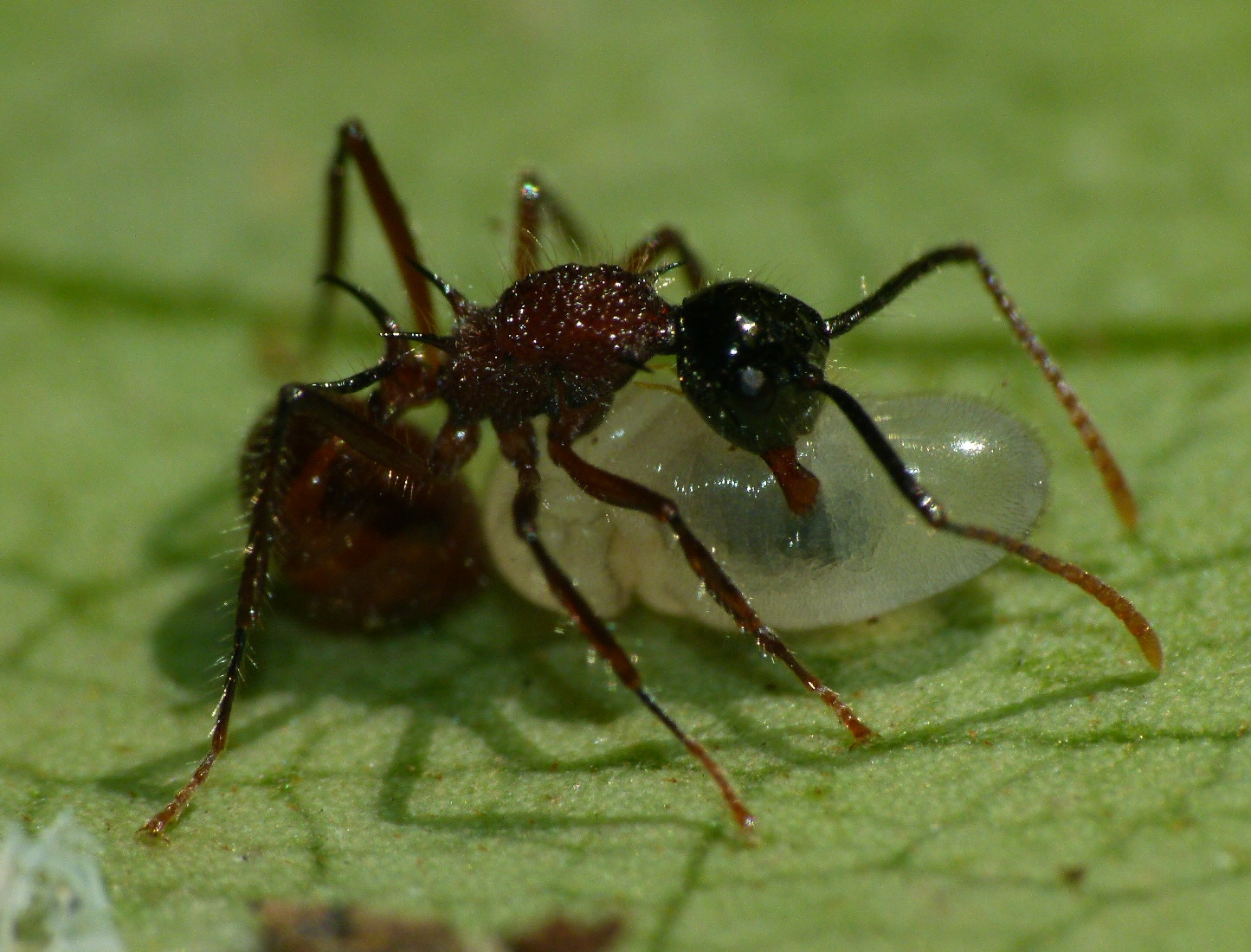
With a larva

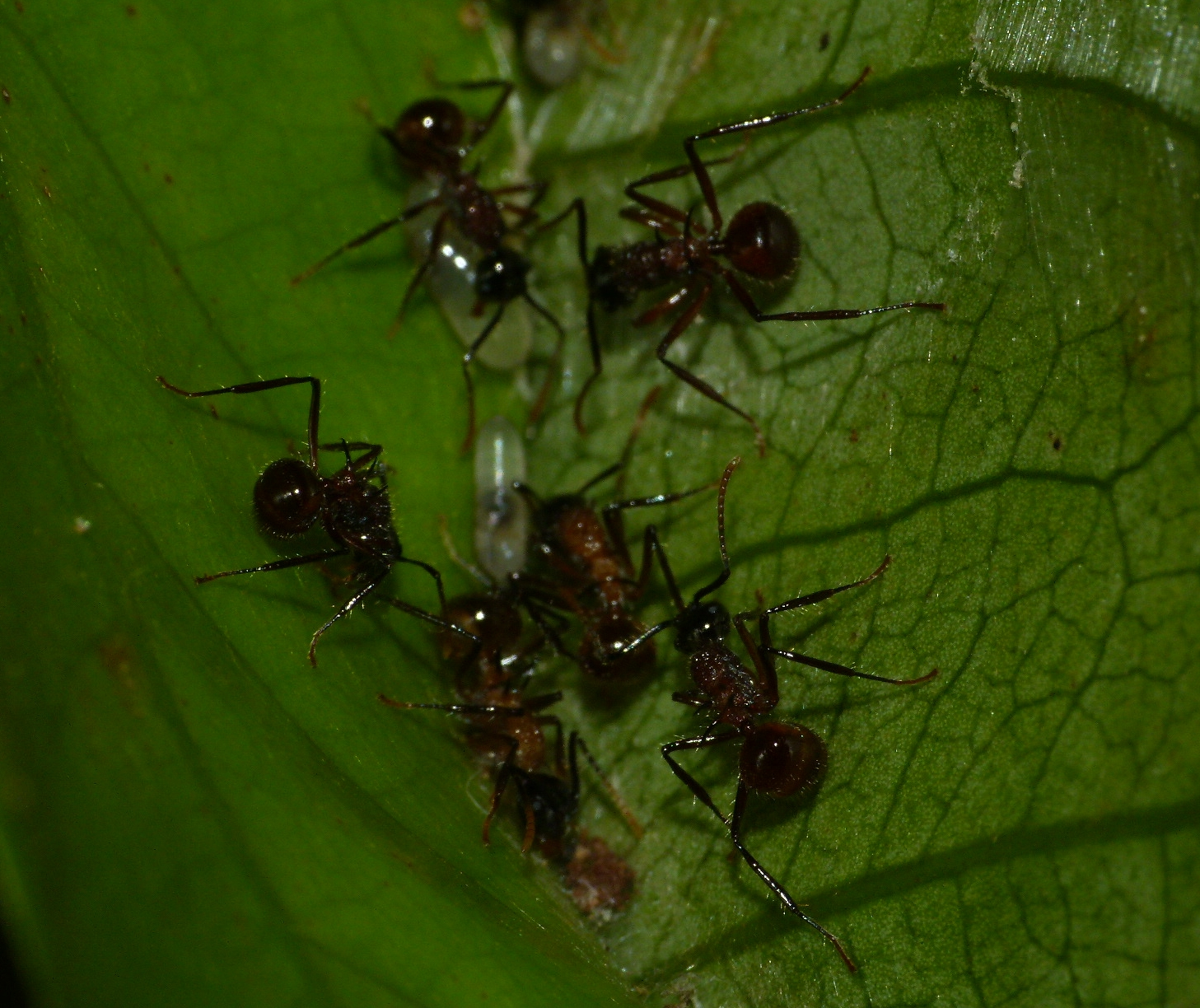
Nest between leaves
