= Denny's paradox =

Question of animal locomotion on water

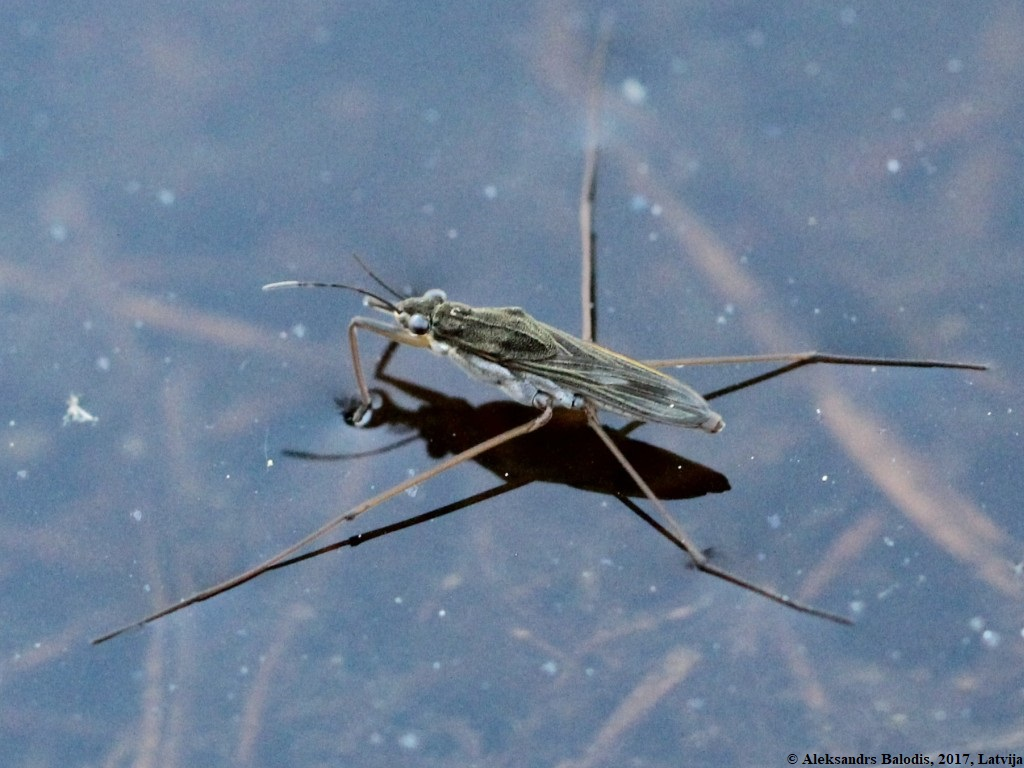
A water strider

In biology, Denny's paradox refers to the apparent impossibility of surface-dwelling animals such as the water strider generating enough propulsive force to move. It is named after biologist Mark Denny, and relates to animal locomotion on the surface layer of water.

If capillary waves are assumed to generate the momentum transfer to the water, the animal's legs must move faster than the phase speed $c_m$ of the waves, given by

$$c_m=\left(\frac{4g\sigma}{\rho}\right)^{1/4},$$

where $g$ is the acceleration due to gravity, $\sigma$ is the strength of surface tension, and $\rho$ the density of water. For standard conditions, this works out to be about 0.23 m/s. In fact, water striders' legs move at speeds much less than this and, according to this physical picture, cannot move.

Writing in the Journal of Fluid Mechanics, David Hu and John Bush state that Denny's paradox "rested on two flawed assumptions. First, water striders' motion was assumed to rely on the generation of capillary waves, since the propulsive force was thought to be that associated with wave drag on the driving leg. Second, in order to generate capillary waves, it was assumed that the strider leg speed must exceed the minimum wave speed, $c_m=\left(4g\sigma/\rho\right)^{1/4}\simeq 0.23\mathrm{m/s}$. We note that this second assumption is strictly true only for steady motions".
