= Polyrhachis horni =

Scientific classification
- Kingdom: Animalia
- Phylum: Arthropoda
- Clade: Pancrustacea
- Class: Insecta
- Order: Hymenoptera
- Family: Formicidae
- Subfamily: Formicinae
- Genus: Polyrhachis
- Subgenus: Myrma
- Species: P. horni

Binomial name
- Polyrhachis horni Emery, 1901

Species of ant

Polyrhachis horni is a species of ant in the subfamily Formicinae. It is found in India and Sri Lanka.
