= Polyrhachis jerdonii =

Scientific classification
- Kingdom: Animalia
- Phylum: Arthropoda
- Clade: Pancrustacea
- Class: Insecta
- Order: Hymenoptera
- Family: Formicidae
- Subfamily: Formicinae
- Genus: Polyrhachis
- Subgenus: Myrmhopla
- Species: P. jerdonii

Binomial name
- Polyrhachis jerdonii Forel, 1892

Species of ant

Polyrhachis jerdonii is a species of ant in the subfamily Formicinae. It is endemic to Sri Lanka.

A part of the Polyrhachis cryptoceroides species group. Similar to Polyrhachis thailandica. Both have a laterally marginate mesosoma and a weakly indicated metanotal groove. They differentiate in the overall slupture of the body that, in P. jerdonii, is very delicately and finely reticulate-punctate.
