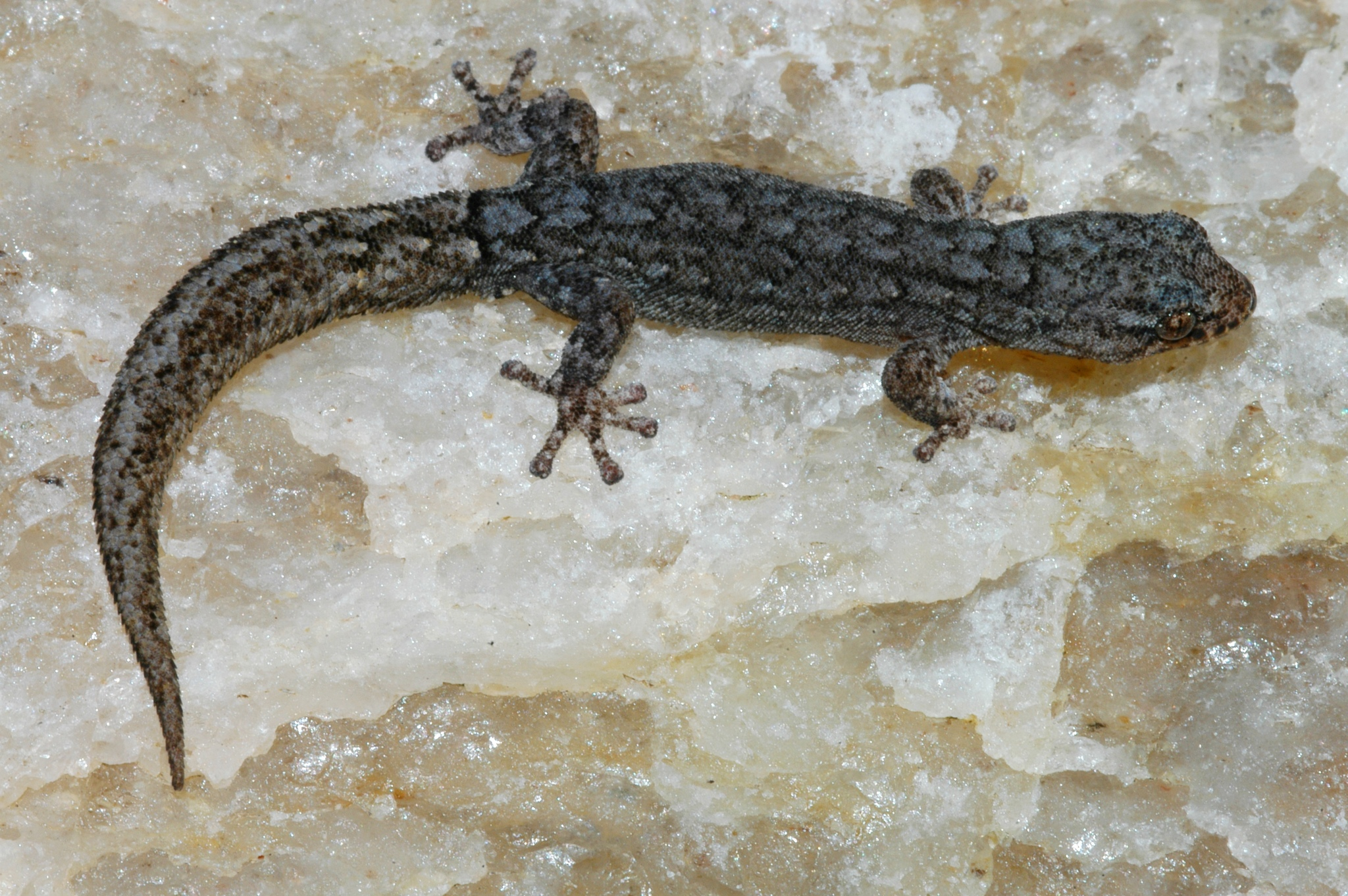

Conservation status
- Least Concern (IUCN 3.1)

Scientific classification
- Kingdom: Animalia
- Phylum: Chordata
- Class: Reptilia
- Order: Squamata
- Suborder: Gekkota
- Family: Gekkonidae
- Genus: Goggia
- Species: G. lineata

Binomial name
- Goggia lineata (Gray, 1838)

Synonyms
- Phyllodactylus lineatus Gray, 1838; Goggia lineata — Bauer et al., 1997

= Goggia lineata =

Species of lizard

Goggia lineata, also known as the striped dwarf leaf-toed gecko or striped pygmy gecko, is a minute and delicate species of dwarf leaf-toed gecko that is indigenous to the western part of the Cape of South Africa. With a length of about 4 cm (1.6 in), this tiny nocturnal gecko is, along with Cryptactites peringueyi (Peringuey's leaf-toed gecko), the smallest lizard in southern Africa.

== Geographic range ==
Its natural range extends from Cape Town (where it is sometimes still found in suburban gardens) eastwards through the Western Cape and then up along South Africa's west coast as far as Namibia.

== Description ==
It is a pale grey lizard of about 4 cm (1.6 in) in length, usually with several dark stripes running down its back.

== Behaviour and habitat ==
They can often be found sheltering under rubble or vegetation, alongside other species, being happy to share a refuge with other larger geckos such as Afrogecko porphyreus (the marbled leaf-toed gecko).

== Diet ==
Collectively they eat a great deal of small insects such as ants and termites, helping to serve as a form of natural pest-control.

== Threats ==
Domestic cats - as introduced predators - will usually kill large numbers of these little lizards, often exterminating them from the immediate area.

== Reproduction ==
This species of dwarf leaf-toed gecko lays two tiny eggs in a moist, warm spot in summer.
