= Polyrhachis rupicapra =

Scientific classification
- Kingdom: Animalia
- Phylum: Arthropoda
- Clade: Pancrustacea
- Class: Insecta
- Order: Hymenoptera
- Family: Formicidae
- Subfamily: Formicinae
- Genus: Polyrhachis
- Subgenus: Myrmhopla
- Species: P. rupicapra

Binomial name
- Polyrhachis rupicapra Roger, 1863

Species of ant

Polyrhachis rupicapra is a species of spiny ant belonging to the genus Polyrhachis in the subfamily Formicinae, found in Sri Lanka, India, and China.
