= Goggia essexi =

Conservation status
- Least Concern (IUCN 3.1)

Scientific classification
- Kingdom: Animalia
- Phylum: Chordata
- Class: Reptilia
- Order: Squamata
- Suborder: Gekkota
- Family: Gekkonidae
- Genus: Goggia
- Species: G. essexi

Binomial name
- Goggia essexi (Hewitt, 1925)
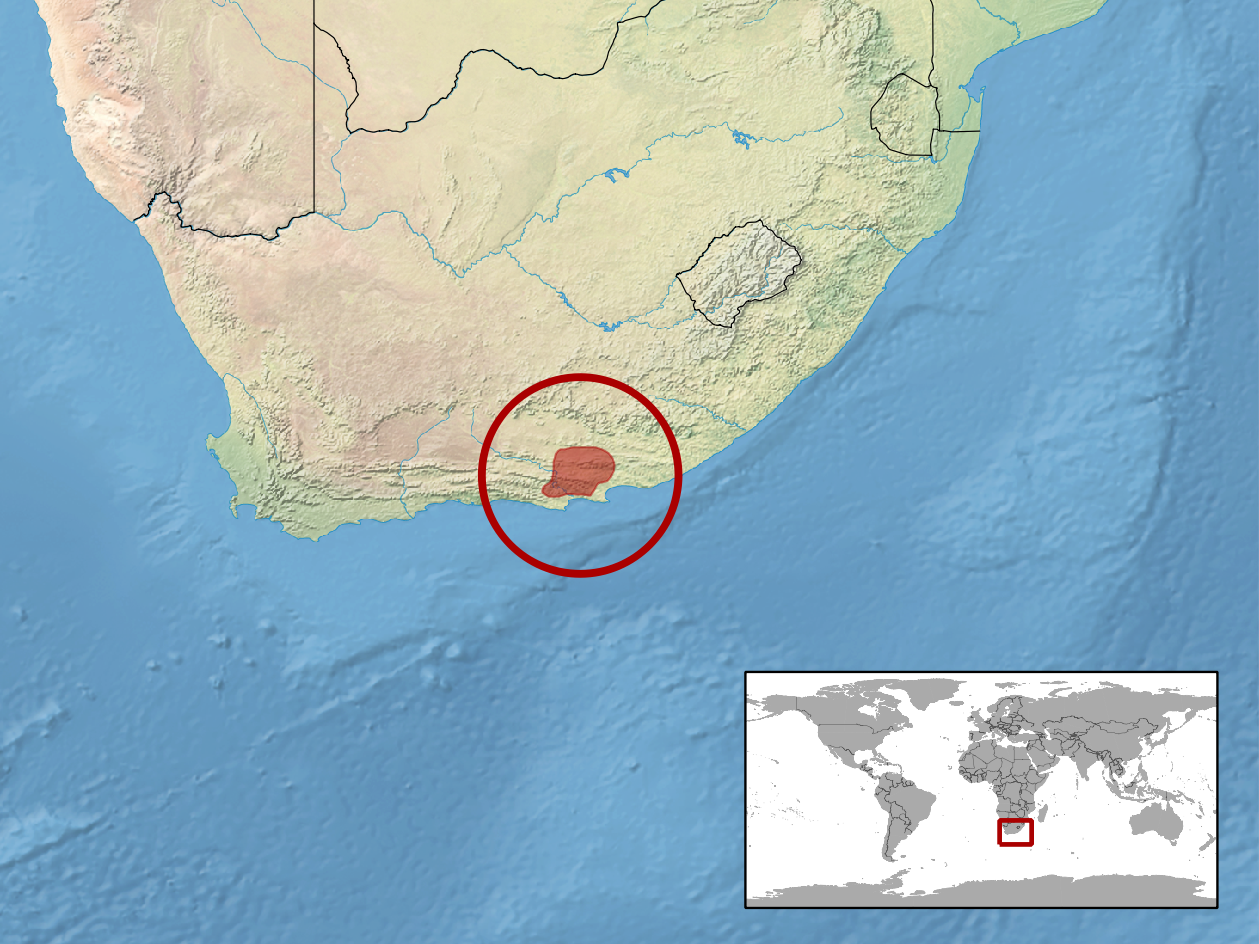

Synonyms
- Phyllodactylus essexi Hewitt, 1925; Phyllodactylus lineatus essexi — Hewitt, 1937; Phyllodactylus essexi — Branch, Bauer & Good, 1995; Goggia essexi — Bauer, Good & Branch, 1997

Species of lizard

Goggia essexi, also known commonly as Essex's dwarf leaf-toed gecko, Essex's leaf-toed gecko, and Essex's pygmy gecko, is a species of gecko, a lizard in the family Gekkonidae. The species is endemic to South Africa.

== Etymology ==
The specific name, essexi, is in honor of South African herpetologist Robert Essex.

== Geographic range ==
G. essexi is found in Eastern Cape province, South Africa.

== Habitat ==
The preferred natural habitat of G. essexi is rocky areas in shrubland.

== Description ==
G. essexi is very small for its genus. Adults usually have a snout-to-vent length (SVL) of 2.0–2.5 cm (0.79–0.98 in), with a tail slightly longer than SVL. The maximum recorded SVL is 2.84 cm (1.12 in).

== Reproduction ==
G. essexi is oviparous. Sexually mature females lay eggs in a communal site under a rock.
