= Steven D. Gaines =

American marine biologist

Steven D. Gaines is an American marine biologist based in California whose research focuses on fisheries, marine reserves, and marine ecology and conservation.

== Education ==
Gaines received his bachelor's degree in biology from University of California, Irvine, before attending Oregon State University for his PhD. He received his PhD in 1983 under the guidance of Jane Lubchenco and Bruce Menge. His dissertation focused on consumer resource interactions in both Oregon and Panama.

Gaines then moved to Stanford University, where he was a postdoctoral scholar in the lab of Joan Roughgarden until 1987. His research at Stanford focused on the importance of interspecific interactions and larval delivery in intertidal areas.

== Career and research ==
Gaines joined the Brown University faculty in 1987, working there until 1994. He then started a faculty position at the University of California Santa Barbara. In 1997 he became the director of UCSB's Marine Science Institute. In 2010, he was appointed as the Dean of the Bren School of Environmental Science and Management at UCSB, and later was also a strategic advisor for the emLab at UCSB. Before these positions, he also served as the Acting Vice Chancellor for Research and the Acting Dean of Science at UCSB. He retired from roles as Dean and Distinguished Professor in 2025.

In 2009, Gaines, along with many other marine ecologists, started the Partnership for Interdisciplinary Studies of Coastal Oceans with a $17.7 million grant, studying the long-term health of nearshore environments on the US west coast. Gaines also co-founded the Santa Barbara Coastal LTER project, focusing on kelp forests. He has published numerous articles on marine ecology and climate change, including the impacts of temperature on larval settlement and dispersal, species range shifts, and the impact of the environment on species interactions. Gaines has advocated for increasing public awareness of the importance of the ocean in the fight against climate change, as well as promoting better communication of ocean science.

=== Marine reserves ===
In 2003, Gaines was awarded a Pew Fellowship, allowing him to help implement the Marine Life Protection Act in California. This act established a statewide coastal marine network in the state. He has also worked extensively to understand the ecological, social, and economic impacts of Marine Protected Areas, advocating for the implementation and maintenance of protected areas across United States coastal areas.

=== Fisheries management ===
Gaines' research includes market based reforms to make fisheries management more sustainable, including the role of aquaculture. He has also focused much of his career on understanding the link between marine protected areas and fisheries health and sustainability. Most of this work focuses on the importance of strong networks of many small marine protected areas that can increase fisheries yield. He, along with Chris Costello, founded the Sustainable Fisheries Group in 2006, which later provided the foundation for emLab. His work on fisheries has expanded to include the importance of improving fisheries management to offset the negative impacts of climate change. This work was also named a top scientific contribution by the journal Nature in 2008.

== Awards and honors ==
Gaines has served on editorial and advisory boards for many organizations, including Ecology and Ecological Monographs and the National Science Foundation. In 2009 he was named an American Association for the Advancement of Science fellow. That same year, he received the inaugural Marc J. Hershman Excellence in Mentoring Award from the Joint Ocean Commission Initiative. He was awarded a Peter Benchley Ocean Award for Excellence in Science in 2014. He has published over 300 scientific articles and 4 books in his career.
