= Goggia =

Scientific classification
- Kingdom: Animalia
- Phylum: Chordata
- Class: Reptilia
- Order: Squamata
- Suborder: Gekkota
- Family: Gekkonidae
- Subfamily: Uroplatinae
- Genus: Goggia; Bauer, Good & Branch, 1997

Species
- Ten recognized species, see article.

Genus of lizards

Goggia, also known commonly as dwarf leaf-toed geckos or pygmy geckos, is a genus of African geckos, lizards in the family Gekkonidae.

== Geographic range ==
Species in the genus Goggia are found in southern Africa.

== Species ==
The following ten species are recognized as being valid.

- Goggia braacki (Good, Bauer & Branch, 1996) – Braack's dwarf leaf-toed gecko
- Goggia essexi (Hewitt, 1925) – Essex's dwarf leaf-toed gecko
- Goggia gemmula (Bauer, Branch & Good, 1996) – Richtersveld dwarf leaf-toed gecko
- Goggia hewitti (Branch, Bauer & Good, 1995) – Hewitt's dwarf leaf-toed gecko
- Goggia hexapora (Branch, Bauer & Good, 1995) – Cedarberg dwarf leaf-toed gecko
- Goggia incognita Heinicke, Turk & Bauer, 2017
- Goggia lineata (Gray, 1838) – striped dwarf leaf-toed gecko
- Goggia matzikamaensis Heinicke, Turk & Bauer, 2017
- Goggia microlepidota (V. FitzSimons, 1939) – small-scaled dwarf leaf-toed gecko
- Goggia rupicola (V. FitzSimons, 1938) – Namaqualand dwarf leaf-toed gecko

Nota bene: A binomial authority in parentheses indicates that the species was original described in a genus other than Goggia.
