= Polyrhachis sokolova =

Scientific classification
- Kingdom: Animalia
- Phylum: Arthropoda
- Clade: Pancrustacea
- Class: Insecta
- Order: Hymenoptera
- Family: Formicidae
- Subfamily: Formicinae
- Genus: Polyrhachis
- Subgenus: Chariomyrma
- Species: P. sokolova

Binomial name
- Polyrhachis sokolova Forel 1902

Species of ant

Polyrhachis sokolova is a species of ant from Australia and New Guinea that recently was discovered to be capable of surviving tidal inundations.

Researchers at the James Cook University gained attention in 2006 after finding and reporting this behavior. Polyrhachis sokolova nests in mud in mangrove swamps, regularly inundated by rising tides. They survive these inundations in pockets of air that are trapped within the nest. This lifestyle calls for regular moving of their eggs, larvae and cocoons to stay ahead of water trickling into the nest passages. A large amount of effort is expended on repairing water damage after each high tide. The ants are able to move across large stretches of water by either running on the surface tension skin or swimming with their legs below the surface. While swimming it has been documented that these ants are eaten by fish, mud skippers, and crabs.
