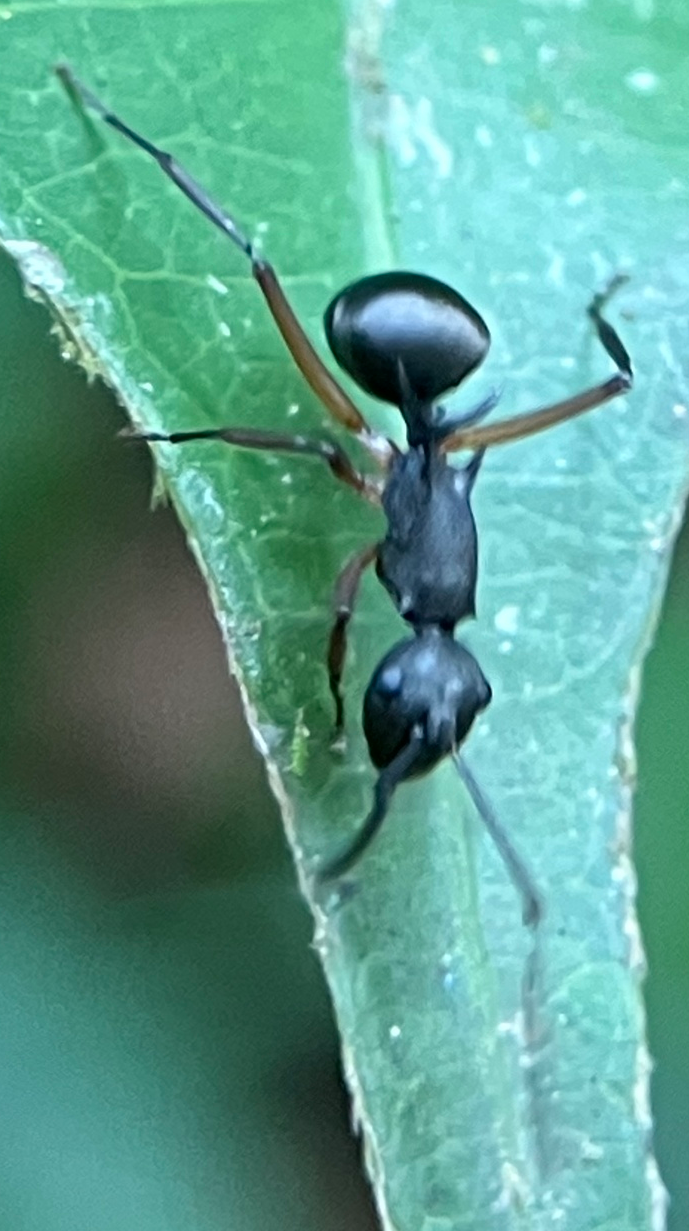

Scientific classification
- Kingdom: Animalia
- Phylum: Arthropoda
- Clade: Pancrustacea
- Class: Insecta
- Order: Hymenoptera
- Family: Formicidae
- Subfamily: Formicinae
- Genus: Polyrhachis
- Subgenus: Myrmhopla
- Species: P. hippomanes

Binomial name
- Polyrhachis hippomanes Smith, F., 1861

= Polyrhachis hippomanes =

Species of ant

Polyrhachis hippomanes is a species of ant in the subfamily Formicinae, found in Sri Lanka. Three subspecies are recognized. 2 subspecies were given full species status recently.

== Subspecies ==
- Polyrhachis hippomanes boettcheri Stitz, 1925 – Borneo, Philippines
- Polyrhachis hippomanes ceylonensis Emery, 1893 – India, Sri Lanka, China
- Polyrhachis hippomanes hippomanes Smith, F., 1861 – Borneo, Sulawesi, India, Thailand
