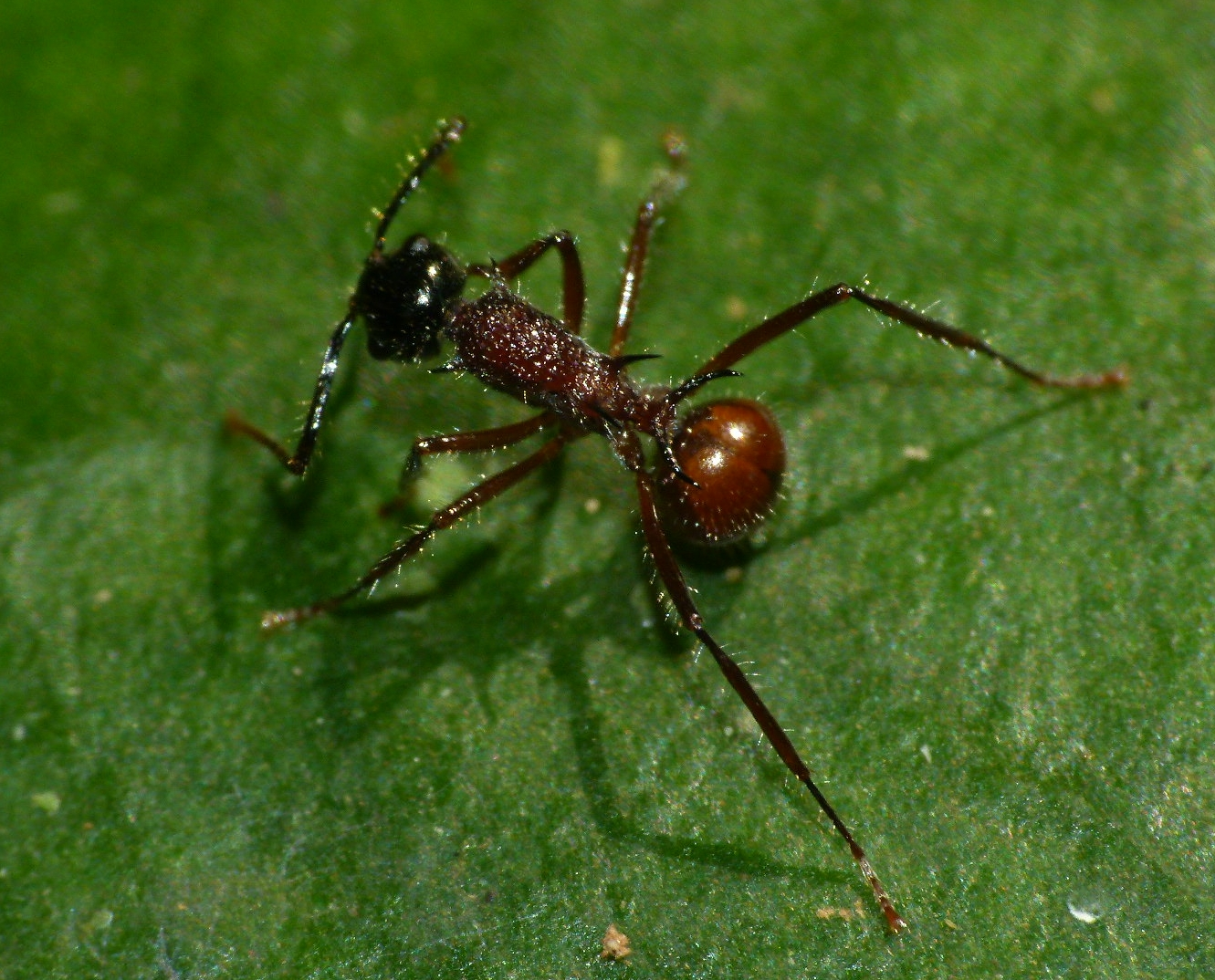
- Polyrhachis gracilior

Scientific classification
- Kingdom: Animalia
- Phylum: Arthropoda
- Class: Insecta
- Order: Hymenoptera
- Family: Formicidae
- Subfamily: Formicinae
- Tribe: Camponotini
- Genus: Polyrhachis; F. Smith, 1857

Type species
- Formica bihamata

Diversity
- 712 species

Synonyms
- Cephalomyrma Karavaiev, 1935; Dolichorhachis Mann, 1919; Evelyna Donisthorpe, 1937; Florencea Donisthorpe, 1937; Irenea Donisthorpe, 1938; Johnia Karavaiev, 1927; Morleyidris Donisthorpe, 1944

= Polyrhachis =

Polyrhachis Temporal range: Miocene–Present

Genus of ants

Polyrhachis is a genus of formicine ants found in the Old World with over 600 species. The genus is yet to be comprehensively resolved and contains many varied species including nest-weavers (e.g. Polyrhachis dives), swimming workers (e.g. Polyrhachis sokolova), soil (e.g. Polyrhachis proxima) and tree-dwellers (e.g. Polyrhachis bicolor). The first fossil record of this genus was of Polyrhachis annosa from the Miocene.

== General morphology ==
Size: Workers range in size approx 5–10mm in length. Eyes developed, no ocelli. Antennae have 12 segments. Antennal insertions situated far from posterior margin of clypeus. Mesosoma of most species have spines on one or more of its pronotal, mesonotal or propodeal components. Petiole armed with spines or teeth. First gastral tergite well developed, longer in dorsal view than exposed parts of the following terga together. Opening at gastral apex for release of venom lacking a radial fringe of hairs.

== Ecology ==
Polyrhachis species include an array of nesting types ranging from terrestrial, soil-based nests to arboreal nests. As a result, the nest architectures also vary with some species displaying a high level of complexity to nest building, utilizing larval silk to weave nest materials together. Such nest weaving is more commonly associated (and indeed more complex) in ants of the genus Oecophylla.

Polyrhachis species do not have stingers but instead an acidopore that can spray formic acid. When attacking, this is often sprayed in combination with biting thus making the acid more effective against the subject of the attack. Polyrhachis that do not possess a metapleural gland seem to utilise the antibiotic properties of their formic acid and when it cannot be used, ants are more likely to succumb to parasite infection

Some species are found to be social parasites of different ant genera; Polyrachis lamellidens is an excellent example. They live in the Korean Peninsula, China, and other parts of northeastern Asia. Their nuptial flight occurs from late September to late November depending on the climate. After the flight, the dealate queens search for host colonies. Usually, Camponotus japonicus is the host; however Camponotus atrox is the main host in Korea. Korean antkeepers say that they even take on to Formica japonica and Camponotus quadrinotatus. Once the newly mated queens find a host colony, they attack small workers and acquire their pheromones. After repeating this process to multiple ants, they sneak into the nest and pretend to be a colony member. Then, whether they hibernate or not, they eventually go to the host queen's chamber. They reach the queen, biting its neck, subduing it, and inheriting its pheromones. Eventually, it cuts the neck of the host queen. This process usually lasts 2–4 days but can take over 2 weeks. After this process, its actions are similar to those of other social parasites.

Other species exhibiting social parasitism include Polyrhachis lama and Polyrhachis loweryi, which intrude other ants' colonies of different subfamilies, some permanently living within the host colonies.

== Subgenera ==
As of 2024, Polyrhachis contains 13 subgenera.

- Aulacomyrma
- Campomyrma
- Chariomyrma
- Cyrtomyrma
- Hagiomyrma
- Hedomyrma
- Hemioptica
- Hirtomyrma
- Myrma
- Myrmatopa
- Myrmhopla
- Myrmothrinax
- Polyrhachis

== Selected species ==
- Polyrhachis ammon (NSW)
- Polyrhachis beccari
- Polyrhachis bihamata
- Polyrhachis bugnioni
- Polyrhachis convexa
- Polyrhachis curvispina
- Polyrhachis cyaniventris
- Polyrhachis dives
- Polyrhachis exercita
- Polyrhachis gibbosa
- Polyrhachis gracilior
- Polyrhachis hagiomyrma
- Polyrhachis hippomanes
- Polyrhachis horni
- Polyrhachis illaudata
- Polyrhachis jerdonii
- Polyrhachis lamellidens
- Polyrhachis nigra
- Polyrhachis punctillata
- Polyrhachis rastellata
- Polyrhachis rupicapra
- Polyrhachis scissa
- Polyrhachis semiinermis
- Polyrhachis sokolova
- Polyrhachis sophocles
- Polyrhachis thrinax
- Polyrhachis tibialis
- Polyrhachis xanthippe
- Polyrhachis yerburyi
