= Pheidole dodo =

Scientific classification
- Kingdom: Animalia
- Phylum: Arthropoda
- Class: Insecta
- Order: Hymenoptera
- Family: Formicidae
- Subfamily: Myrmicinae
- Genus: Pheidole
- Species: P. dodo

Binomial name
- Pheidole dodo Fischer & Fisher, 2013

Species of ant

Pheidole dodo is a species of ant in the subfamily Myrmicinae. It is named after the dodo, an extinct bird of Mauritius.

== Habitat and distribution ==
Pheidole dodo is known from Mauritius only, where it was collected from the ground, inside rotten logs, under moss or from the leaf litter and in coastal scrub, closed vegetation, low closed forest, disturbed and undisturbed rainforest, in elevations between 1 and 760 m.

== Description ==
The minors are most similar to those of P. braueri, differing from the latter by slightly smaller eyes and decumbent to subdecumbent versus mostly suberect scape pilosity in P. braueri. The majors look like an odd hybrid of those of P. braueri, P. jonas, and P. decepticon, with the head in full-face view somewhat resembling that of P. decepticon, the mesosoma in profile similar to P. jonas and the postpetiole shape closest to P. braueri. This combination, however, makes this species unique and easily identifiable on the islands of the Malagasy region.
