= P. purpurea =

P. purpurea may refer to:

- Pheidole purpurea, an ant species found in Mexico and Central America
- Puccinia purpurea, a plant pathogen species that causes rust on sorghum
- Porphyra purpurea, a red algae found in Europe and Canada

== See also ==
- Purpurea (disambiguation)
