= Pheidole malinsii =

Scientific classification
- Kingdom: Animalia
- Phylum: Arthropoda
- Clade: Pancrustacea
- Class: Insecta
- Order: Hymenoptera
- Family: Formicidae
- Subfamily: Myrmicinae
- Genus: Pheidole
- Species: P. malinsii

Binomial name
- Pheidole malinsii Forel, 1902

Species of ant

Pheidole malinsii is a species of ant in the subfamily Myrmicinae. It is found in India, Sri Lanka, and China.
