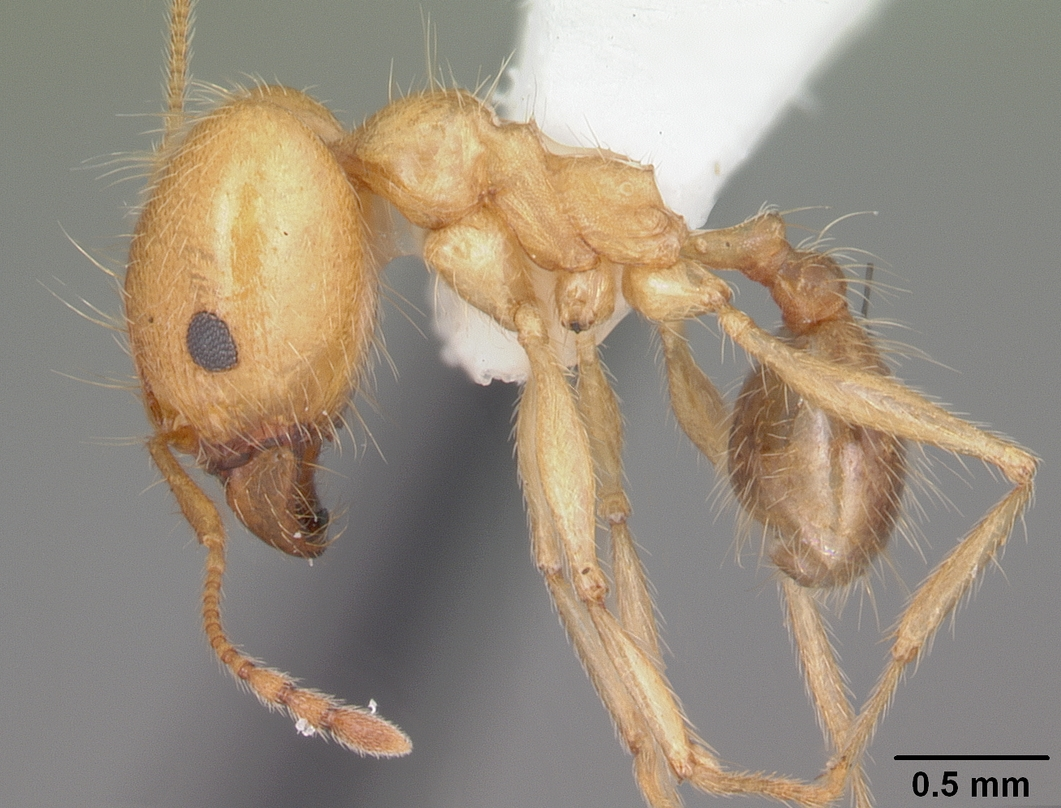

Scientific classification
- Kingdom: Animalia
- Phylum: Arthropoda
- Class: Insecta
- Order: Hymenoptera
- Family: Formicidae
- Subfamily: Myrmicinae
- Tribe: Attini
- Genus: Pheidole
- Species: P. morrisii

Binomial name
- Pheidole morrisii Forel, 1886

= Pheidole morrisii =

Species of ant

Pheidole morrisii is a species of ant and a higher myrmicine in the family Formicidae.

== Subspecies ==
These two subspecies belong to the species Pheidole morrisii:

- Pheidole morrisii impexa Wheeler, 1908^{i c g}
- Pheidole morrisii morrisii Forel, 1886^{i c g}

Data sources: i = ITIS, c = Catalogue of Life, g = GBIF, b = Bugguide.net
