= Pheidole symbiotica =

Conservation status
- Vulnerable (IUCN 2.3)

Scientific classification
- Kingdom: Animalia
- Phylum: Arthropoda
- Class: Insecta
- Order: Hymenoptera
- Family: Formicidae
- Subfamily: Myrmicinae
- Genus: Pheidole
- Species: P. symbiotica

Binomial name
- Pheidole symbiotica Wasmann, 1909

Species of ant

Pheidole symbiotica is a species of ant in the genus Pheidole. It is endemic to Argentina.
