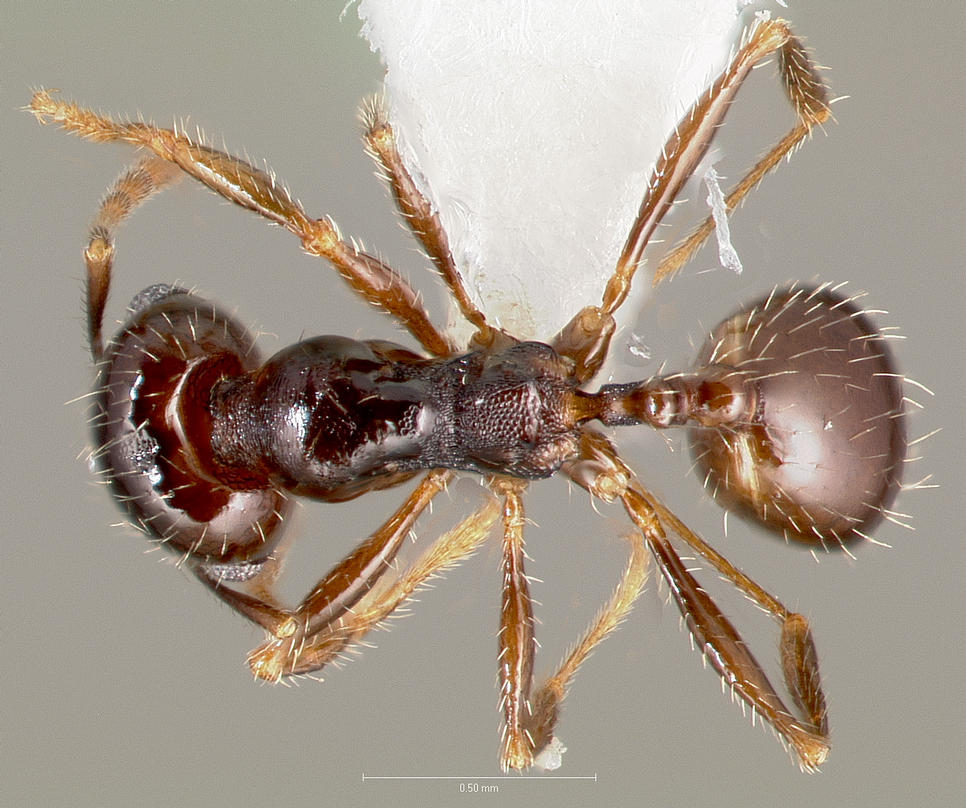

Scientific classification
- Kingdom: Animalia
- Phylum: Arthropoda
- Class: Insecta
- Order: Hymenoptera
- Family: Formicidae
- Subfamily: Myrmicinae
- Tribe: Attini
- Genus: Pheidole
- Species: P. xerophila

Binomial name
- Pheidole xerophila Wheeler, 1908

= Pheidole xerophila =

Species of ant

Pheidole xerophila is a species of ant and a higher myrmicine in the family Formicidae.

Like many other species in the genus Pheidole, the ants are dimorphic; colonies contain two castes of workers, "minor" and much larger "major" workers.

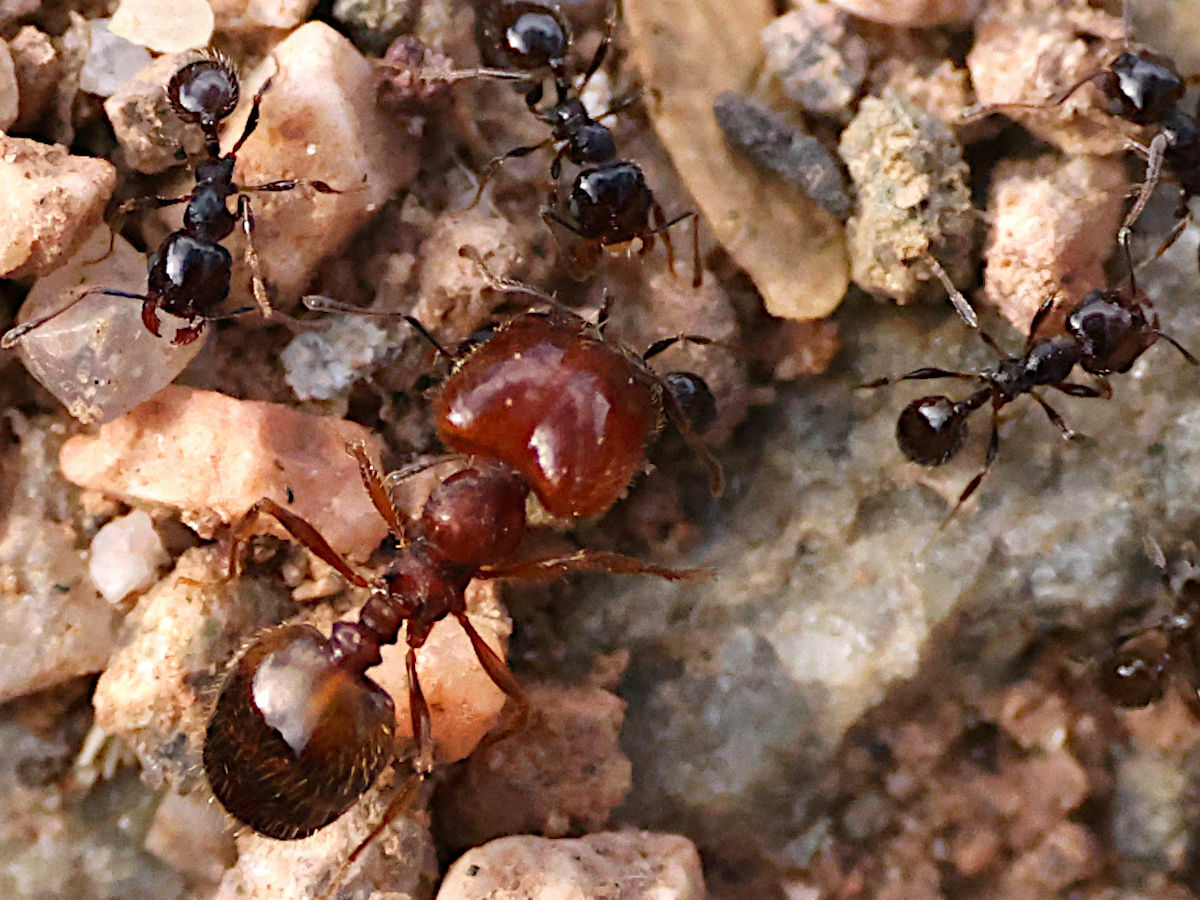
major and minor workers
