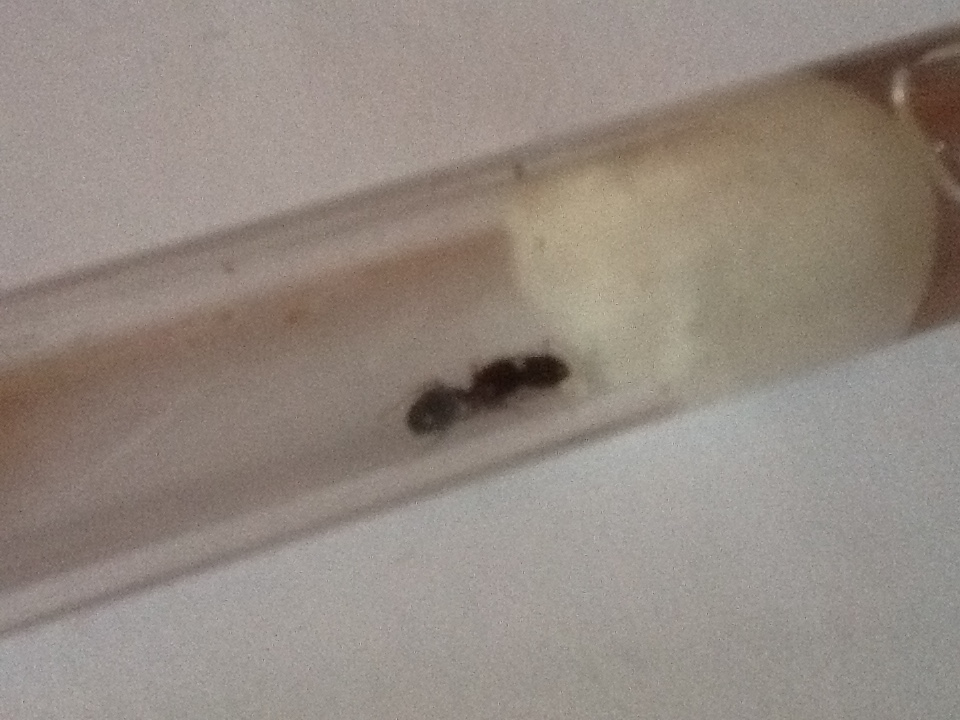
- Pheidole clavata queen in test tube

Scientific classification
- Domain: Eukaryota
- Kingdom: Animalia
- Phylum: Arthropoda
- Class: Insecta
- Order: Hymenoptera
- Family: Formicidae
- Subfamily: Myrmicinae
- Genus: Pheidole
- Species: P. clavata

Binomial name
- Pheidole clavata (Emery, 1877)

= Pheidole clavata =

Species of ant

Pheidole clavata is a species of ant in the genus Pheidole. Pheidole clavata inhabits Eastern and Northern Africa. This species of Pheidole, like many others, are dimorphic, which means that a colony may contain one or several queens. Each colony is made up of two castes: the "minor" workers, and the "major" workers, or "soldiers". The majors have large heads that they use as both weapons and tools to cut open large prey for the colony. The latter generally have enormous heads and mandibles in comparison to their usually fairly modest body size.

== Colony behavior ==
Pheidole clavata very well-resemble most of their genus, colonies may grow up to 5000 ants that each play a part in helping their colony; tending larvae and pupae, foraging, and building. They resemble other Pheidole species in many ways, but their differences in other species are clearly visible: colonies of Pheidole clavata are not as active as many others are and they are not as visibly dominant towards territory as other species of the genus. However, they do tend to have colonies take up a large amount of space, and the raids that these ants perform on termites are absolutely spectacular. The colonies have queens that fly around April–May, generally around spring months.

== Distribution ==
Pheidole clavata is distributed many places throughout Central and East Africa, from Kenya, Tanzania and Ethiopia forests to tropical grasslands of Sudan and the Congo.
