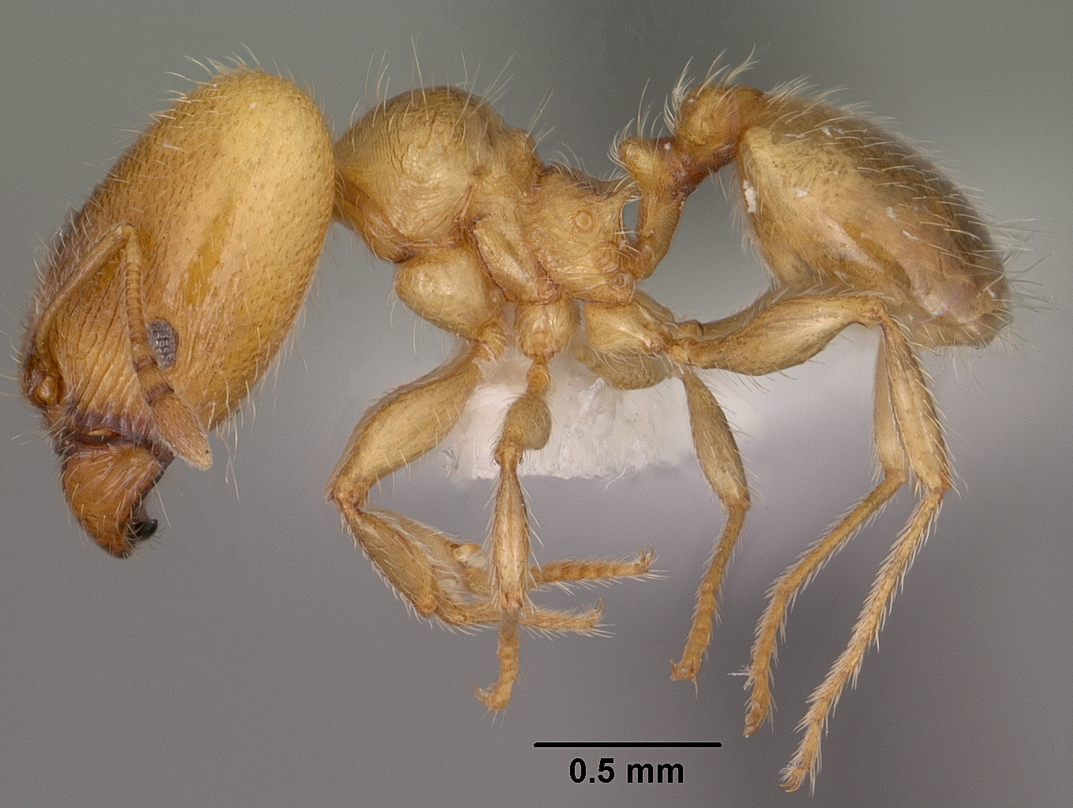
- Pheidole bicarinata major worker

Scientific classification
- Kingdom: Animalia
- Phylum: Arthropoda
- Clade: Pancrustacea
- Class: Insecta
- Order: Hymenoptera
- Family: Formicidae
- Subfamily: Myrmicinae
- Genus: Pheidole
- Species: P. bicarinata

Binomial name
- Pheidole bicarinata Mayr, 1870

= Pheidole bicarinata =

Species of ant

Pheidole bicarinata, the Common Big-Headed Ant is a species of ant in the genus Pheidole. It is distributed across United States, from Nebraska, Colorado, Texas, Utah and Nevada, east to New Jersey and Florida. It is found in a wide range of habitats.

== Diet ==
Pheidole bicarinata are known to eat insects, collect seeds, and consume nectar from extrafloral nectaries. Seeds consumed include the seeds of Poa pratensis, Taraxanum officinale, Oenothera biennis, and more.

== Development ==
Colonies of Pheidole bicarinata grow quickly in captivity. They are noted to reach up to 4000 workers but rarely exceeding that number. Pheidole bicarinata has four larval instars.
