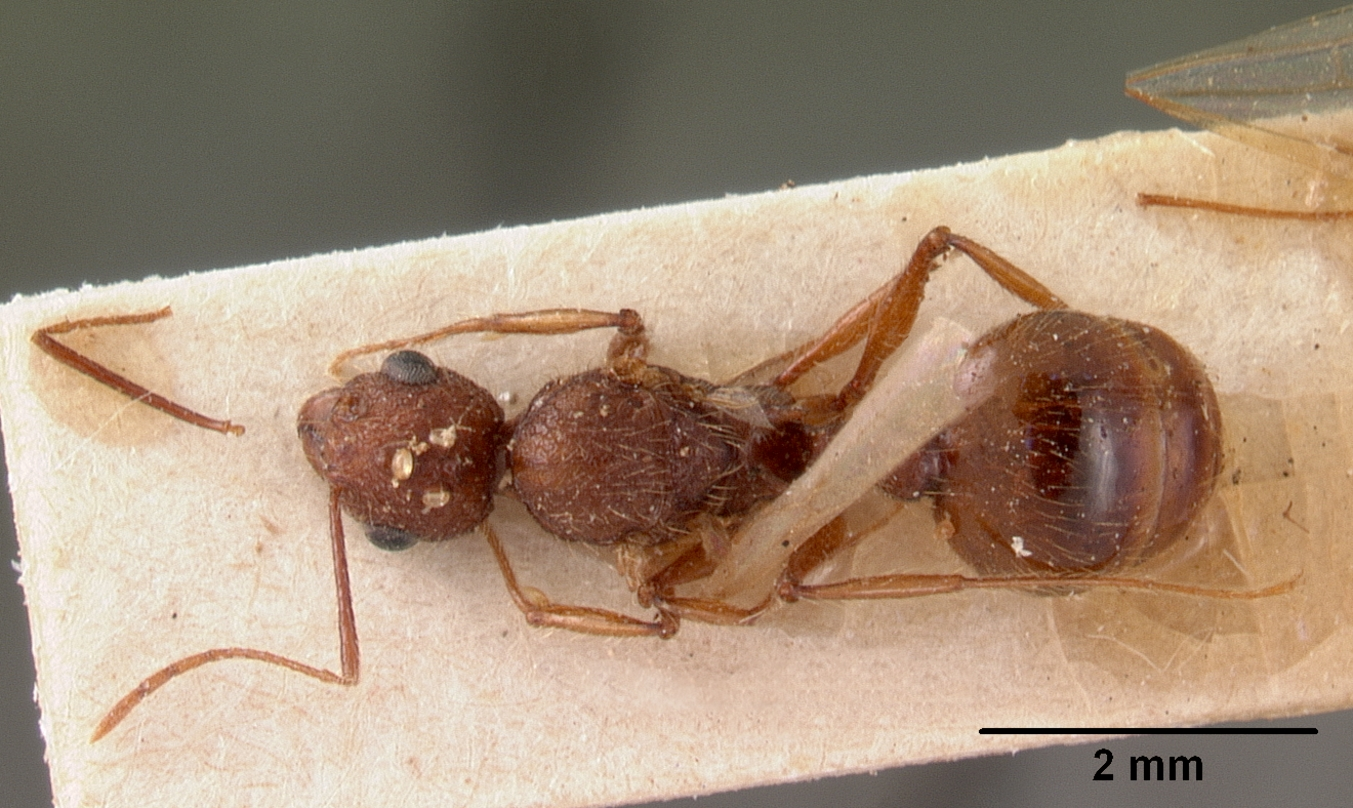
- Pheidole oculata alate queen

Conservation status
- Vulnerable (IUCN 2.3)

Scientific classification
- Kingdom: Animalia
- Phylum: Arthropoda
- Class: Insecta
- Order: Hymenoptera
- Family: Formicidae
- Subfamily: Myrmicinae
- Genus: Pheidole
- Species: P. oculata

Binomial name
- Pheidole oculata (Emery, 1899)

Synonyms
- Parapheidole oculta (Emery, 1899)

= Pheidole oculata =

Species of ant

Pheidole oculata is a species of ant in the subfamily Myrmicinae. It is endemic to Madagascar.
