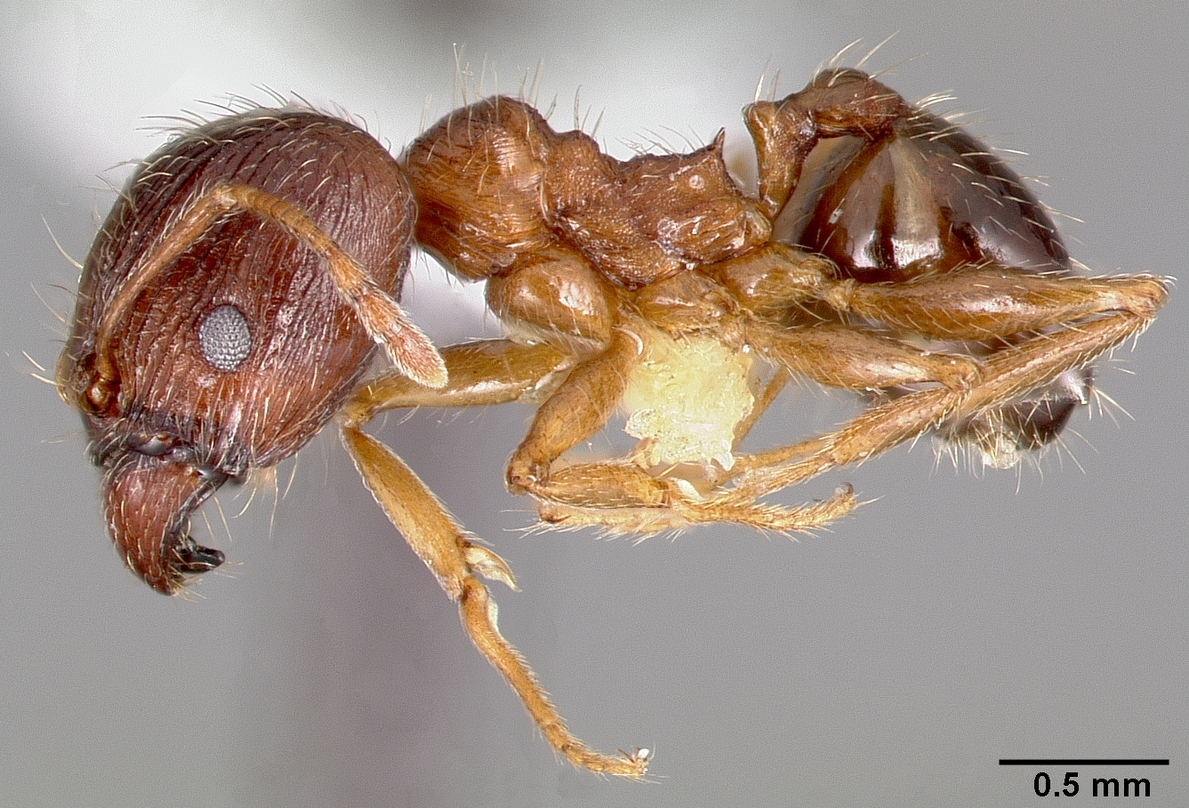
- P. teneriffana major worker from the United States

Scientific classification
- Kingdom: Animalia
- Phylum: Arthropoda
- Class: Insecta
- Order: Hymenoptera
- Family: Formicidae
- Subfamily: Myrmicinae
- Genus: Pheidole
- Species: P. teneriffana

Binomial name
- Pheidole teneriffana Forel, 1893

= Pheidole teneriffana =

Species of ant

Pheidole teneriffana is a species of ant in the subfamily Myrmicinae.

== Habitat and distribution ==
Pheidole teneriffana is an Asian species with collection records scattered over several continents and islands across the globe. Described from the Canary Islands and found widely distributed throughout the greater Mediterranean region. Probably introduced to the Malagasy region, it was described from Madagascar as P. voeltzkowii, only one year after the publication of the senior synonym. Morphologically, P. teneriffana can be grouped together with, and is possibly related to, P. fervens, P. indica, P. oceanica, and P. sinaitica. In the New World, Pheidole teneriffana has been introduced to California, Cuba, Peru, and the West Indian islands. It seems to be common in dry habitats, especially along coasts and in urban areas, and has been described as aggressive toward other ant species, locally abundant, and spreading in urban areas. In the Malagasy region P. teneriffana was collected on the Comoros, Mauritius, the Seychelles, and from coastal towns in Madagascar, usually from under stones, ground nests, or foraging on the ground or lower vegetation in urban or garden habitats at elevations between 2 and 296 m, on Mayotte in native littoral and secondary forest (7 m elevation). It has been collected in Saudi Arabia from soil, under stones, and foraging on the ground on a few farms at elevations between 570 and 1620 m.
