= Pheidole templaria =

Scientific classification
- Kingdom: Animalia
- Phylum: Arthropoda
- Clade: Pancrustacea
- Class: Insecta
- Order: Hymenoptera
- Family: Formicidae
- Subfamily: Myrmicinae
- Genus: Pheidole
- Species: P. templaria

Binomial name
- Pheidole templaria Forel, 1902

Species of ant

Pheidole templaria is a species of ant in the subfamily Myrmicinae.

== Subspecies ==
- Pheidole templaria euscrobata Forel, 1913 - India
- Pheidole templaria templaria Forel, 1902 - Sri Lanka
