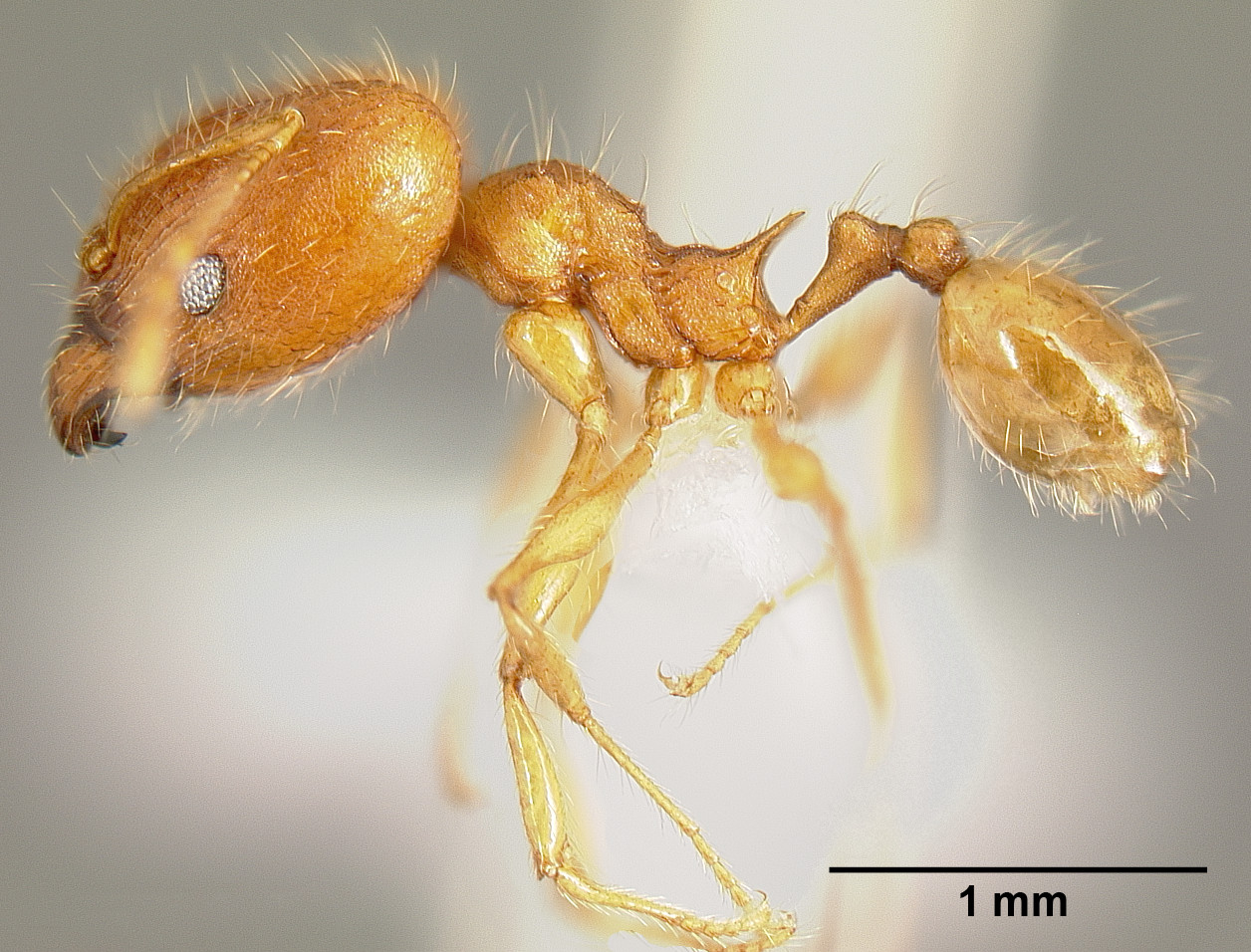

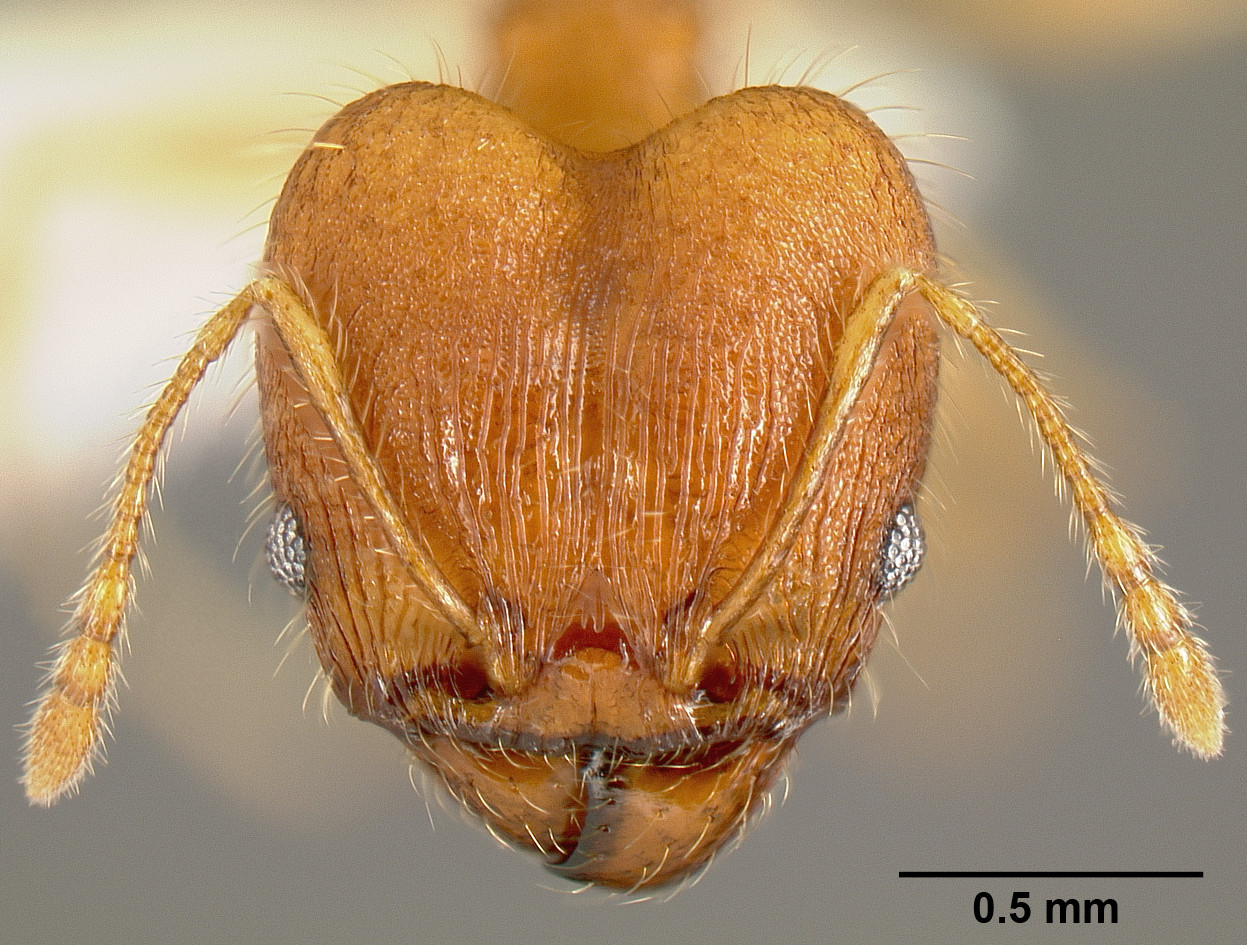

Scientific classification
- Kingdom: Animalia
- Phylum: Arthropoda
- Class: Insecta
- Order: Hymenoptera
- Family: Formicidae
- Subfamily: Myrmicinae
- Genus: Pheidole
- Species: P. epiphyta

Binomial name
- Pheidole epiphyta Longino, J. T., 2009

= Pheidole epiphyta =

Species of ant

Pheidole epiphyta is a species of ant that was discovered and described by Longino, J. T. in 2009.
