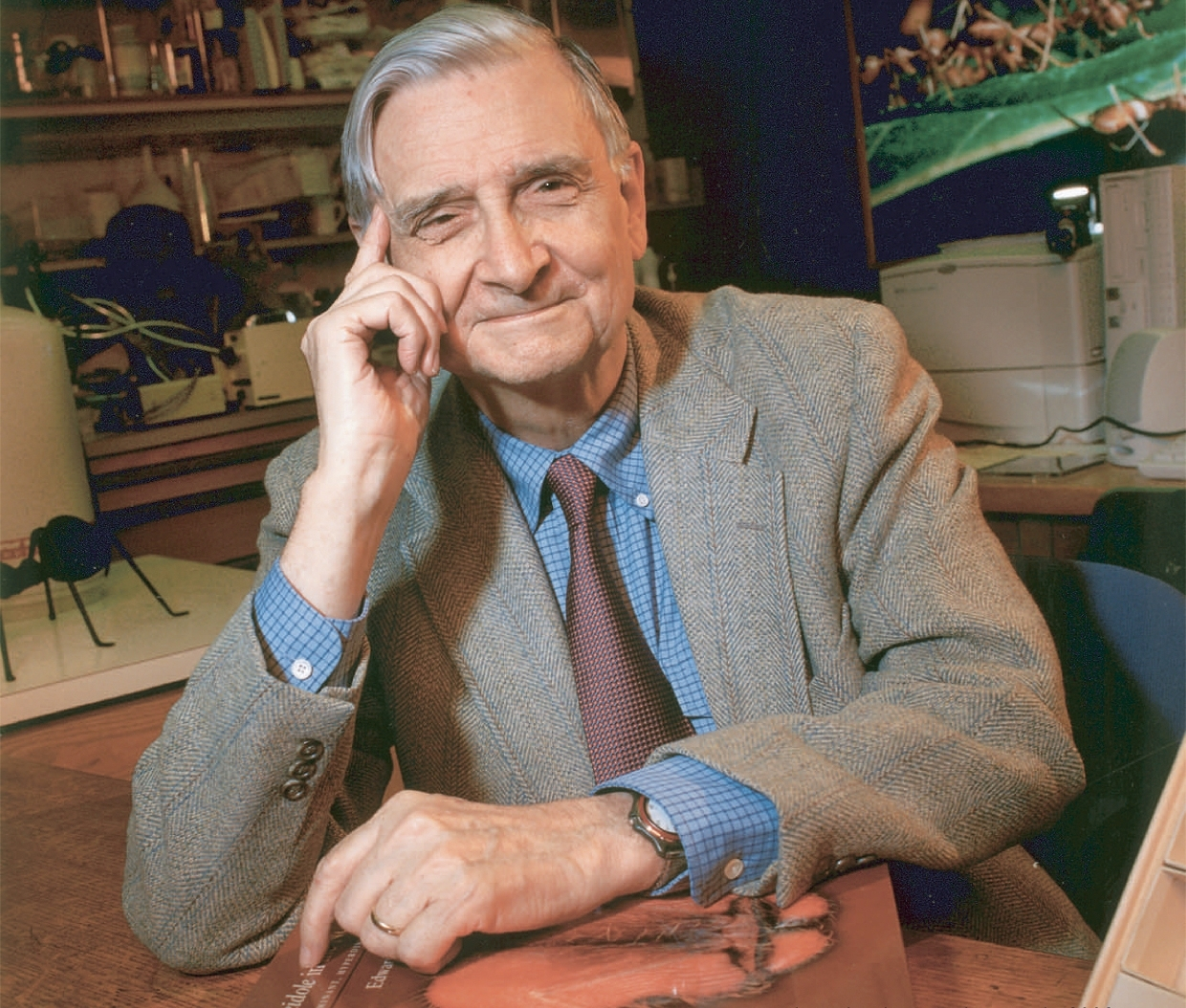
- E.O. Wilson, the namesake of Pheidole eowilsoni

Scientific classification
- Kingdom: Animalia
- Phylum: Arthropoda
- Class: Insecta
- Order: Hymenoptera
- Family: Formicidae
- Subfamily: Myrmicinae
- Genus: Pheidole
- Species: P. eowilsoni

Binomial name
- Pheidole eowilsoni Longino, J. T., 2009

= Pheidole eowilsoni =

Species of ant

Pheidole eowilsoni is a species of ant that was discovered and described by John T. Longino in 2009. It was named in honor of E. O. Wilson. It occurs in Central America.
