= Pheidole simplispinosa =

Scientific classification
- Kingdom: Animalia
- Phylum: Arthropoda
- Clade: Pancrustacea
- Class: Insecta
- Order: Hymenoptera
- Family: Formicidae
- Subfamily: Myrmicinae
- Genus: Pheidole
- Species: P. simplispinosa

Binomial name
- Pheidole simplispinosa Sarnat, E. M., 2008

Species of ant

Pheidole simplispinosa is a species of ant native to the forests of Fiji.
