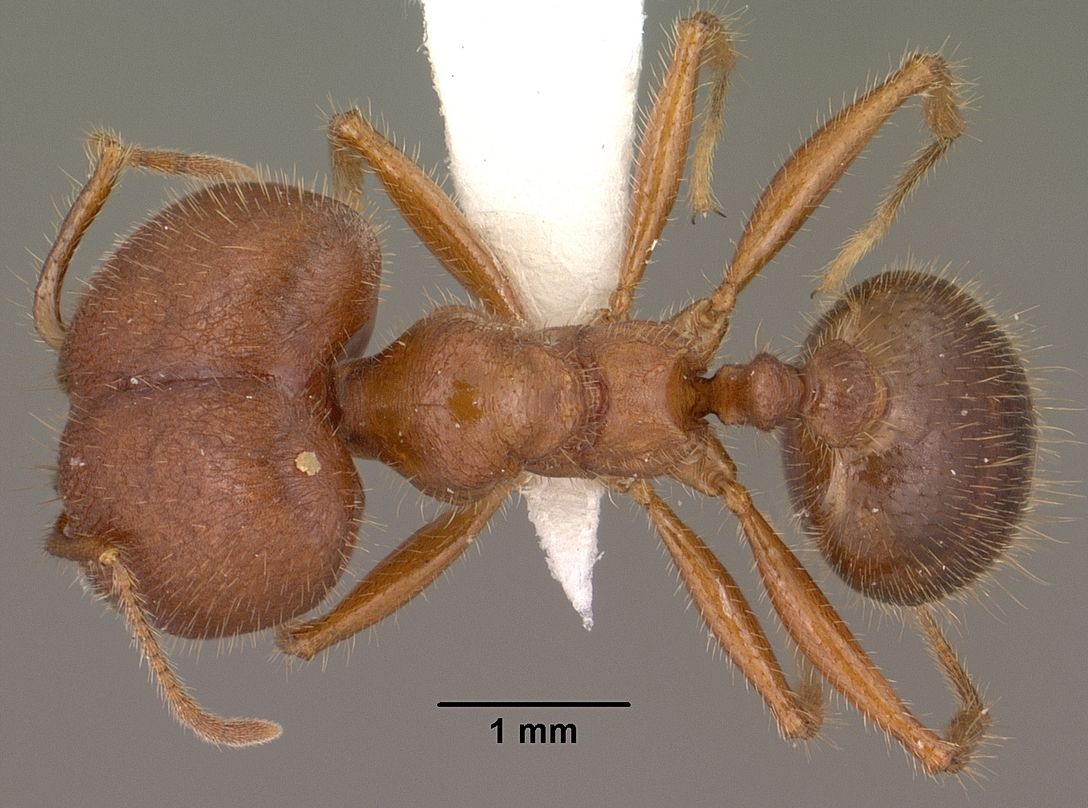

Scientific classification
- Kingdom: Animalia
- Phylum: Arthropoda
- Class: Insecta
- Order: Hymenoptera
- Family: Formicidae
- Subfamily: Myrmicinae
- Tribe: Attini
- Genus: Pheidole
- Species: P. obtusospinosa

Binomial name
- Pheidole obtusospinosa Pergande, 1896

= Pheidole obtusospinosa =

Species of ant

Pheidole obtusospinosa is a species of ant and a higher myrmicine in the family Formicidae.

== Defence ==
Pheidole obstuspinosa has evolved big, chunky, squared heads, because they protect the colony from dangerous ant species, for example Eciton burchelli, the army ant, like blocking enterances to the colony.
