= Pheidole ragnax =

Scientific classification
- Kingdom: Animalia
- Phylum: Arthropoda
- Class: Insecta
- Order: Hymenoptera
- Family: Formicidae
- Subfamily: Myrmicinae
- Genus: Pheidole
- Species: P. ragnax

Binomial name
- Pheidole ragnax Fischer & Fisher, 2013

Species of ant

Pheidole ragnax is a species of ant in the subfamily Myrmicinae.

== Description ==
Pheidole ragnax seems closely related to P. bessonii from Madagascar, as the two share important key characters such as the occipital collar and the elongated shapes of the head, mesonotum, scapes, legs, and postpetiole in minor workers, and the acute lateral postpetiolar process and face with obliquely longitudinal rugae in major workers.

All six specimens of this species were collected from a single rotten log in coastal scrub rainforest on Mayotte, which is less than 350 km north and east of the coast of Madagascar. Such proximity suggests that P. ragnax could represent a mere geographic variation of P. bessonii. Nevertheless, the P. ragnax specimens can be clearly separated from the type material of P. bessonii by the more elongated head shape, scapes, and legs in the minor workers. The holotype major worker of P. ragnax differs from that of P. bessonii in the oblique versus convex head sides, as well as longer scapes, mandibles, legs, and larger eyes. However, until more material of P. ragnax is collected and the whole group is revised, there will not be a definite answer to whether P. ragnax is a synonym of P. bessonii or a distinct biological species.
