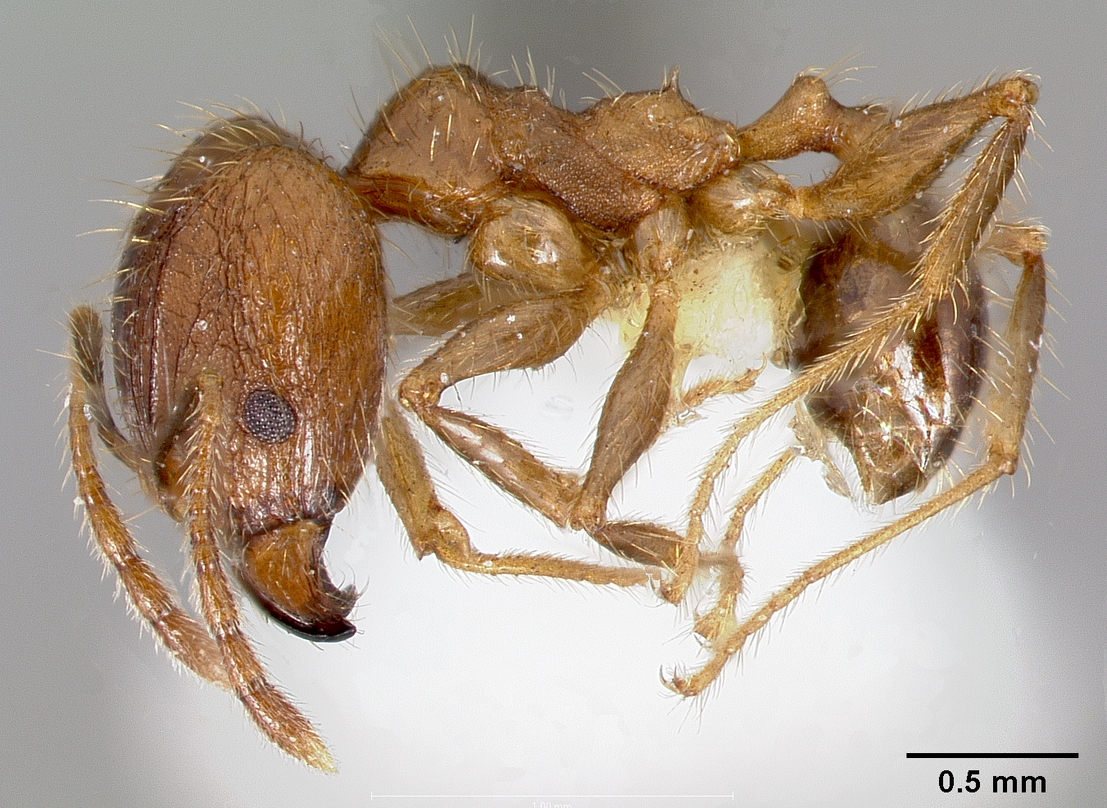
- P. fervens major worker from the United States

Scientific classification
- Domain: Eukaryota
- Kingdom: Animalia
- Phylum: Arthropoda
- Class: Insecta
- Order: Hymenoptera
- Family: Formicidae
- Subfamily: Myrmicinae
- Genus: Pheidole
- Species: P. fervens

Binomial name
- Pheidole fervens Smith, 1858

= Pheidole fervens =

Species of ant

Pheidole fervens is a species of ant in the subfamily Myrmicinae. Pheidole fervens, described from Singapore, is a widespread invasive species and could be native to the Oriental or the Oceanic region.

== Habitat and distribution ==
It usually nests in soil or under stones and usually prefers disturbed habitats. On Fiji it was collected in elevations between 1–800 m and tended to inhabit several different habitats from forest edge and mangrove forest to disturbed and undisturbed rainforest. On Mauritius, which seems to be its western distribution limit, this ant was found in the leaf litter of lowland rainforest (200 m elevation). As with most other introduced ants, such as P. teneriffana, it is unclear what effect, if any, P. fervens might have on the rest of the local ant fauna. Considering that the ecosystems of the Mauritius islands have been severely altered and disturbed since the arrival of human settlers several hundred years ago, and native species must also contend with the invasions of introduced organisms, parts of the original ant fauna might have been marginalized or driven to extinction long ago. Fischer & Fisher (2013) speculate that the scarcity of P. fervens specimens in Mauritius ant collections and its presence in the rainforest means that this ant has not yet become an invasive and dominant aggressor toward other ant species. Nevertheless, efforts to further investigate the presence and activity of introduced Pheidole species are worthwhile, especially in the few remaining undisturbed habitats.

== Description ==
The workers of P. fervens can be easily confused with those of P. teneriffana. Morphologically the minor workers are best separated by coarse, mostly suberect scape pilosity, impressed metanotal groove, relatively smaller eyes and shorter spines in P. fervens versus decumbent to subdecumbent scape pilosity with longer suberect hairs along outer edge, inconspicuous metanotal groove in profile, and larger eyes and longer spines in P. teneriffana. The major workers of P. fervens are recognizable by having longer scapes and a narrower postpetiole in dorsal view than P. teneriffana. In P. fervens, the pilosity in the face and on the metatibia is coarser and at least partly suberect, and the punctures on the sides of the face are stronger than the thinner and more decumbent to subdecumbent pilosity and superficial punctures on the sides of the face in P. teneriffana.
