= Pheidole nietneri =

Scientific classification
- Kingdom: Animalia
- Phylum: Arthropoda
- Clade: Pancrustacea
- Class: Insecta
- Order: Hymenoptera
- Family: Formicidae
- Subfamily: Myrmicinae
- Genus: Pheidole
- Species: P. nietneri

Binomial name
- Pheidole nietneri Emery, 1901

Species of ant

Pheidole nietneri is a species of ant in the subfamily Myrmicinae. It is found in Sri Lanka and China.
