= Pheidole acutidens =

Conservation status
- Vulnerable (IUCN 2.3)

Scientific classification
- Kingdom: Animalia
- Phylum: Arthropoda
- Class: Insecta
- Order: Hymenoptera
- Family: Formicidae
- Subfamily: Myrmicinae
- Genus: Pheidole
- Species: P. acutidens

Binomial name
- Pheidole acutidens (Santschi, 1922)

Species of ant

Pheidole acutidens is a species of ant in the genus Pheidole. It is endemic to Argentina.
