= Pheidole horni =

Scientific classification
- Kingdom: Animalia
- Phylum: Arthropoda
- Clade: Pancrustacea
- Class: Insecta
- Order: Hymenoptera
- Family: Formicidae
- Subfamily: Myrmicinae
- Genus: Pheidole
- Species: P. horni

Binomial name
- Pheidole horni Emery, 1901

Species of ant

Pheidole horni is a species of ant in the subfamily Myrmicinae. It is found in Sri Lanka.
