= Pheidole komori =

Scientific classification
- Kingdom: Animalia
- Phylum: Arthropoda
- Class: Insecta
- Order: Hymenoptera
- Family: Formicidae
- Subfamily: Myrmicinae
- Genus: Pheidole
- Species: P. komori

Binomial name
- Pheidole komori Fischer & Fisher, 2013

Species of ant

Pheidole komori is a species of ant in the subfamily Myrmicinae.

== Habitat and distribution ==
First described in 2013, Pheidole komori was collected in dry forest, coastal scrub land, or along a roadside, and all at elevations between 5 and 50 m from two islands of the Comoros: Moheli and Anjouan. Pheidole komori was also found in secondary forest and sand forest in the Gorongosa National Park in Mozambique. This species could belong to a yet undefined Afrotropical species group, and may be related to morphologically similar species like P. strator from Eritrea, P. strator var. fugax from Mozambique, or P. schultzei var. gwaaiensis from Zimbabwe. The presence of this species in Africa along with related species suggests that P. komori most probably has an Afrotropical origin and did not originate in the Comoros.

== Description ==
In the Malagasy region, this medium-sized Pheidole is easily distinguished from the teneriffana group and other species revised here by minor workers that combine a distinct promesonotal posterior process with a convex postpetiolar ventral process and major workers that combine the distinct promesonotal posterior process with a more elongate head shape and posterolateral lobes that are not rugose or reticulate.
