= Pheidole megatron =

Scientific classification
- Domain: Eukaryota
- Kingdom: Animalia
- Phylum: Arthropoda
- Class: Insecta
- Order: Hymenoptera
- Family: Formicidae
- Subfamily: Myrmicinae
- Genus: Pheidole
- Species: P. megatron

Binomial name
- Pheidole megatron Fischer & Fisher, 2013

Species of ant

Pheidole megatron (named after Megatron from the toy line Transformers) is a species of ant in the subfamily Myrmicinae.

== Habitat and distribution ==
First described in 2013, Pheidole megatron was found under stones, in and under rotten logs, and nesting and foraging on the ground, occurring in coastal scrub, dry forest and in a coconut plantation, in elevations between 10 and 35 m. It was collected only on the islands of Anjouan, Moheli, and Grand Comoro of the Comoros. On Anjouan it occurs together with two likely relatives, P. decepticon and P. megacephala.

== Description ==
From the former species, P. megatron can be distinguished by a slightly larger and more globular postpetiolar ventral process in the major workers and significantly less abundant standing hairs, which often end bluntly or apically split in both worker subcastes, compared to a slightly smaller, more angulate postpetiolar ventral process and relatively numerous, acute standing hairs in P. decepticon. The major workers of P. megatron tend to have a less heart- and more square-shaped head in full-face view than both P. decepticon and P. megacephala, with a shallower posterior emargination, and some to several longitudinal rugulae on the posterior 2/5 of the face, compared to an often heart-shaped head, with a deeper posterior emargination, and an almost completely smooth and shiny posterior head surface in P. decepticon and P. megacephala major workers. The minor workers of P. megatron have a slightly narrower head and larger eyes than those of P. decepticon and also a narrower head and a slightly shorter postpetiole than the minors of P. megacephala.

== See also ==
- Pheidole decepticon, another species with a name from the Transformers toyline
