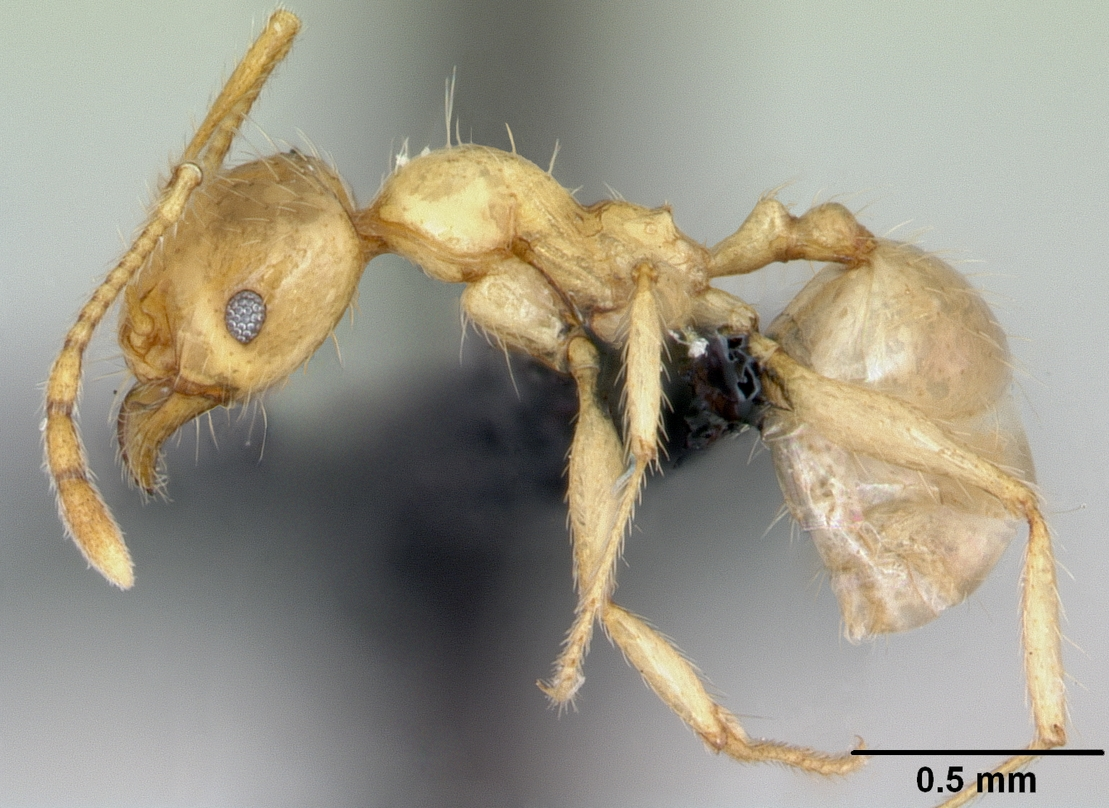
- Pheidole pallidula worker

Scientific classification
- Kingdom: Animalia
- Phylum: Arthropoda
- Class: Insecta
- Order: Hymenoptera
- Family: Formicidae
- Subfamily: Myrmicinae
- Genus: Pheidole
- Species: P. pallidula

Binomial name
- Pheidole pallidula (Nylander, 1849)

= Pheidole pallidula =

Species of ant

Pheidole pallidula stridulations
Soldier
Stridulations from a Pheidole pallidula soldier.

Worker
Stridulations from a Pheidole pallidula worker.

Queen
Stridulations from a Pheidole pallidula queen.

Pheidole pallidula is a species of ant in the genus Pheidole. It is widespread around the Mediterranean.

Colonies can be characterised as being monogynous or polygynous, meaning it can be ruled by one queen or many. Both ruling forms can be seen in colonies from the same population.
