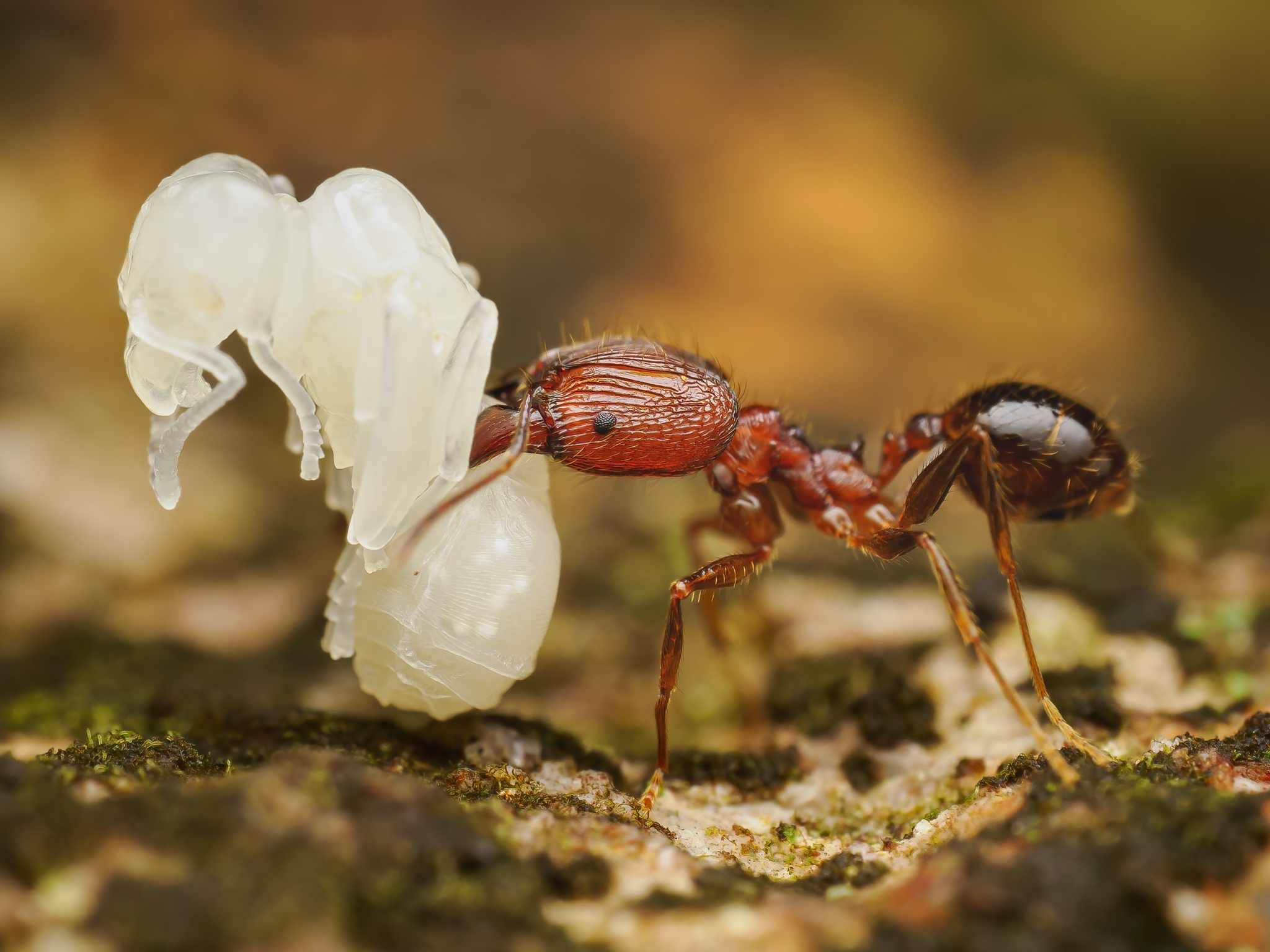

Scientific classification
- Kingdom: Animalia
- Phylum: Arthropoda
- Clade: Pancrustacea
- Class: Insecta
- Order: Hymenoptera
- Family: Formicidae
- Subfamily: Myrmicinae
- Genus: Pheidole
- Species: P. elongicephala

Binomial name
- Pheidole elongicephala Eguchi, K., 2008

= Pheidole elongicephala =

Species of ant

Pheidole elongicephala is a species of ant in the subfamily Myrmicinae.
