= Pheidole loki =

Scientific classification
- Kingdom: Animalia
- Phylum: Arthropoda
- Class: Insecta
- Order: Hymenoptera
- Family: Formicidae
- Subfamily: Myrmicinae
- Genus: Pheidole
- Species: P. loki

Binomial name
- Pheidole loki Fischer & Fisher, 2013

Species of ant

Pheidole loki is a species of ant in the subfamily Myrmicinae.

== Description ==
Majors for this possibly rare species could not be found and thus remain undescribed. Pheidole loki is most probably closely allied to P. jonas and P. vulcan and characterized by reduced sculpture and an intermediate amount of standing hairs, compared to these two species. Overall it resembles P. jonas more than P. vulcan, at least in habitus, morphometric measurements, and promesonotum and postpetiole shape. The minor workers of P. jonas, however, display a more strongly punctate sculpture, less abundant and less flexuous standing hairs, and on average slightly shorter scapes than P. loki, the postpetiole on average as long as wide versus longer than wide in P. loki. With all these easily visible differences between the minor workers of the two species, especially their very distinct pilosity patterns, the chance that P. loki is a morphologically aberrant conspecific of P. jonas is probably small.

== Distribution and habitat ==
First described in 2013, two specimens of Pheidole loki were collected in forest leaf litter in 470 and 630 m elevation on Mt. Combani and Mt. Benara, Mayotte, where it occurs in sympatry with P. jonas.
