= Pheidole bula =

Scientific classification
- Kingdom: Animalia
- Phylum: Arthropoda
- Class: Insecta
- Order: Hymenoptera
- Family: Formicidae
- Subfamily: Myrmicinae
- Genus: Pheidole
- Species: P. bula

Binomial name
- Pheidole bula Sarnat, E. M., 2008

Species of ant

Pheidole bula is a species of ant in the genus Pheidole. It was discovered in Fiji, and described by E. M. Sarnat in 2008.
