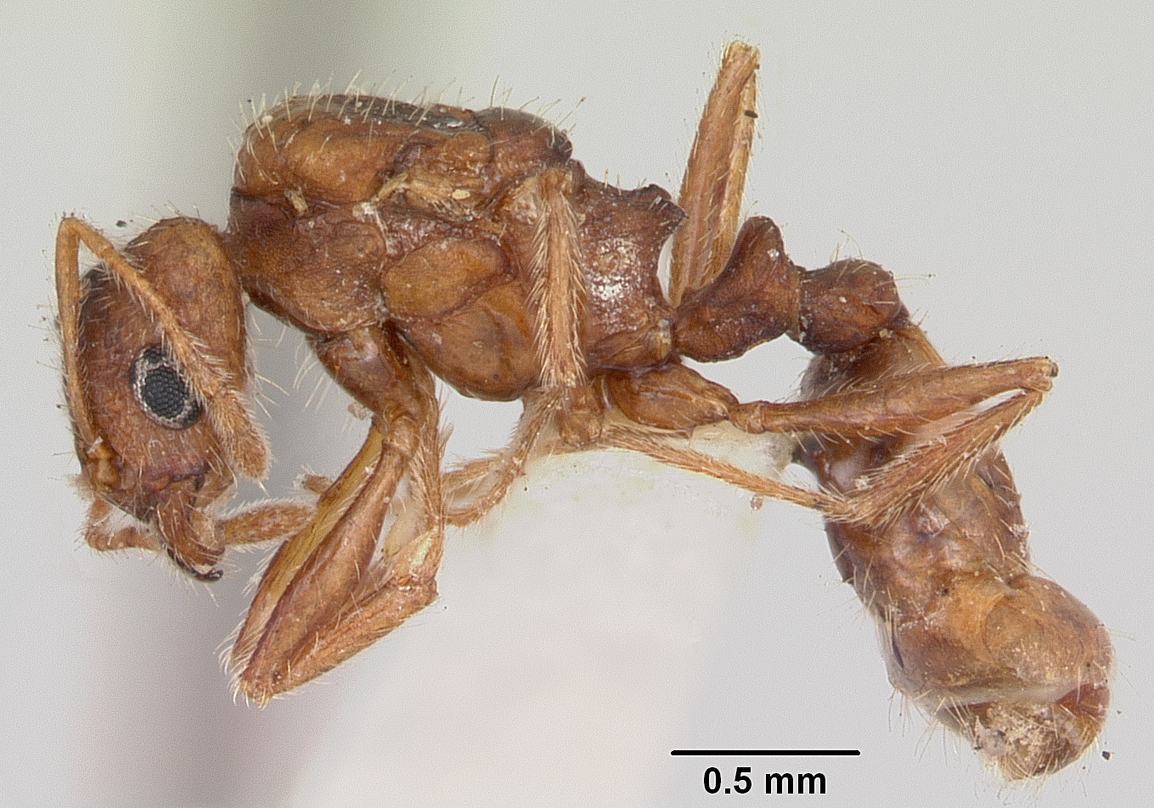
- Pheidole inquilina dealate queen

Conservation status
- Vulnerable (IUCN 2.3)

Scientific classification
- Kingdom: Animalia
- Phylum: Arthropoda
- Class: Insecta
- Order: Hymenoptera
- Family: Formicidae
- Subfamily: Myrmicinae
- Genus: Pheidole
- Species: P. inquilina

Binomial name
- Pheidole inquilina (Wheeler, 1903)

= Pheidole inquilina =

Species of ant

Pheidole inquilina is a species of ant in the genus Pheidole. It is endemic to the United States.
