= Pheidole rugithorax =

Scientific classification
- Kingdom: Animalia
- Phylum: Arthropoda
- Class: Insecta
- Order: Hymenoptera
- Family: Formicidae
- Subfamily: Myrmicinae
- Genus: Pheidole
- Species: P. rugithorax

Binomial name
- Pheidole rugithorax Eguchi, K., 2008

Species of ant

Pheidole rugithorax is a species of ant in the genus Pheidole. It was discovered and described by Eguchi, K. in 2008.
