= Pheidole harlequina =

Scientific classification
- Kingdom: Animalia
- Phylum: Arthropoda
- Class: Insecta
- Order: Hymenoptera
- Family: Formicidae
- Subfamily: Myrmicinae
- Genus: Pheidole
- Species: P. harlequina

Binomial name
- Pheidole harlequina Wilson, E. O., 2003

Species of ant

Pheidole harlequina is a species of ant in the genus Pheidole. It was discovered and described by American biologist E. O. Wilson in 2003. Distribution:República Dominicana (La Vega Prov.)
