= Pheidole vulcan =

Scientific classification
- Domain: Eukaryota
- Kingdom: Animalia
- Phylum: Arthropoda
- Class: Insecta
- Order: Hymenoptera
- Family: Formicidae
- Subfamily: Myrmicinae
- Genus: Pheidole
- Species: P. vulcan

Binomial name
- Pheidole vulcan Fischer & Fisher, 2013

Species of ant

Pheidole vulcan (named after Vulcan, the Roman god of fire) is a species of ant in the subfamily Myrmicinae.

== Habitat and distribution ==
Pheidole vulcan is known only from the slopes of the two volcanoes Mt. Karthala and La Grille, at elevations between 995 and 1125 m on Grande Comore and thus is possibly an endemic species of the island. The species has been found in rotten logs, sifted leaf litter, under tree bark and on the lower vegetation in montane rainforest.

== Description ==
In its morphology this species is closely related to P. jonas and has been collected in sympatry. While all specimens of P. vulcan are orange in color, the specimens of P. jonas from Mt. Karthala are all dark. More important characters for separating the minor workers of the two species are the shape of the promesonotum in profile, which is less strongly angulate in P. jonas; the amount of sculpture on the clypeus, which is smooth in P. jonas versus posteriorly punctate in P. vulcan; and the significantly more abundant and flexuous standing hairs in P. vulcan in both worker castes. In addition, the postpetiole of P. jonas is relatively longer compared to its height and the height of the petiole than in P. vulcan. The minors of P. vulcan are also similar to those of P. loki. The major workers of P. vulcan differ from those of P. jonas by the combination of a high promesonotal process and inconspicuous to weakly concave transverse groove in the first versus a lower process with concave groove in the latter, longer spines and the postpetiole higher than long versus usually longer than high.
