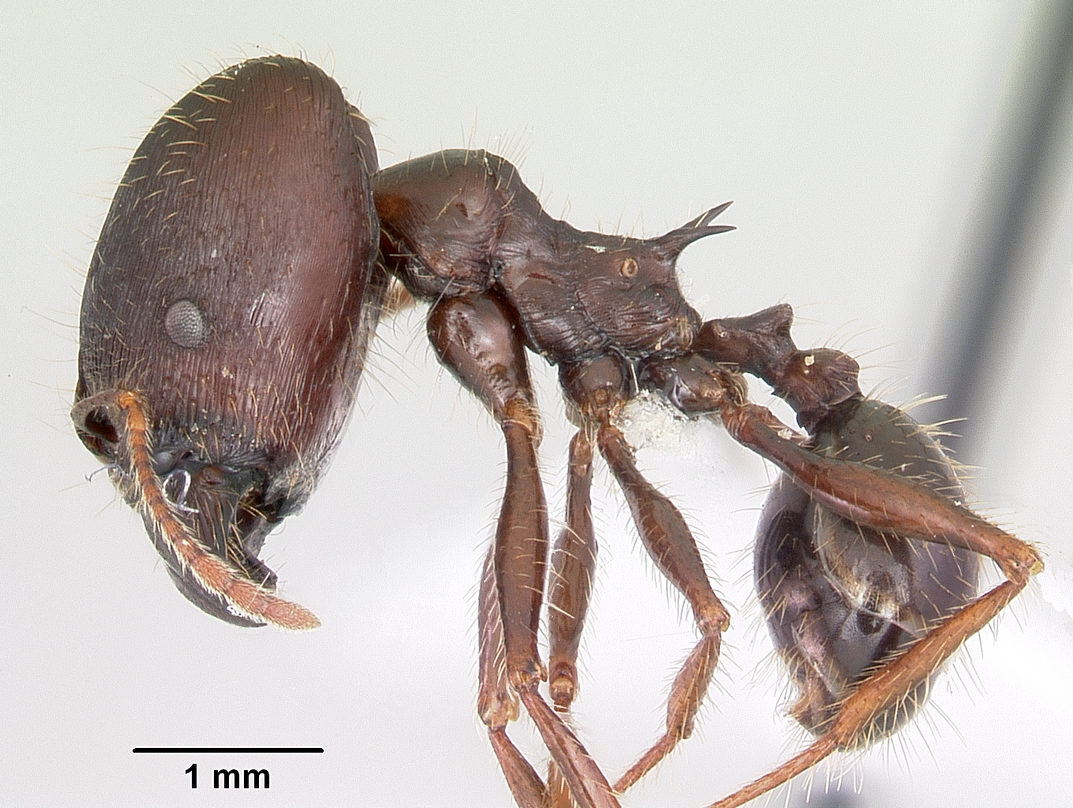

Scientific classification
- Kingdom: Animalia
- Phylum: Arthropoda
- Class: Insecta
- Order: Hymenoptera
- Family: Formicidae
- Subfamily: Myrmicinae
- Tribe: Attini
- Genus: Pheidole
- Species: P. rhea

Binomial name
- Pheidole rhea Wheeler, 1908

= Pheidole rhea =

Species of ant

Pheidole rhea is a species of ant and a higher myrmicine in the family Formicidae. It is common in grassy slopes and hills at the bases of mountains.

== Diet ==
Pheidole rhea is known to consume a variety of seeds, as well as various insects.

== Distribution ==
Pheidole rhea is found in the southwestern United States (especially Arizona) and Northwest Mexico. Habitat in Arizona is commonly grassy hills or lower parts of canyons.

== Behavior ==
Pheidole rhea forms large colonies with multiple castes which all aggressively defend the nest. Workers cannot sting, but majors and supermajors have giant mandibles/heads, used for fighting as well as cracking seeds. Bites are generally non-painful but can be irritating. Large trunks trails are formed to harvest seeds and insects from areas nearby the nest.

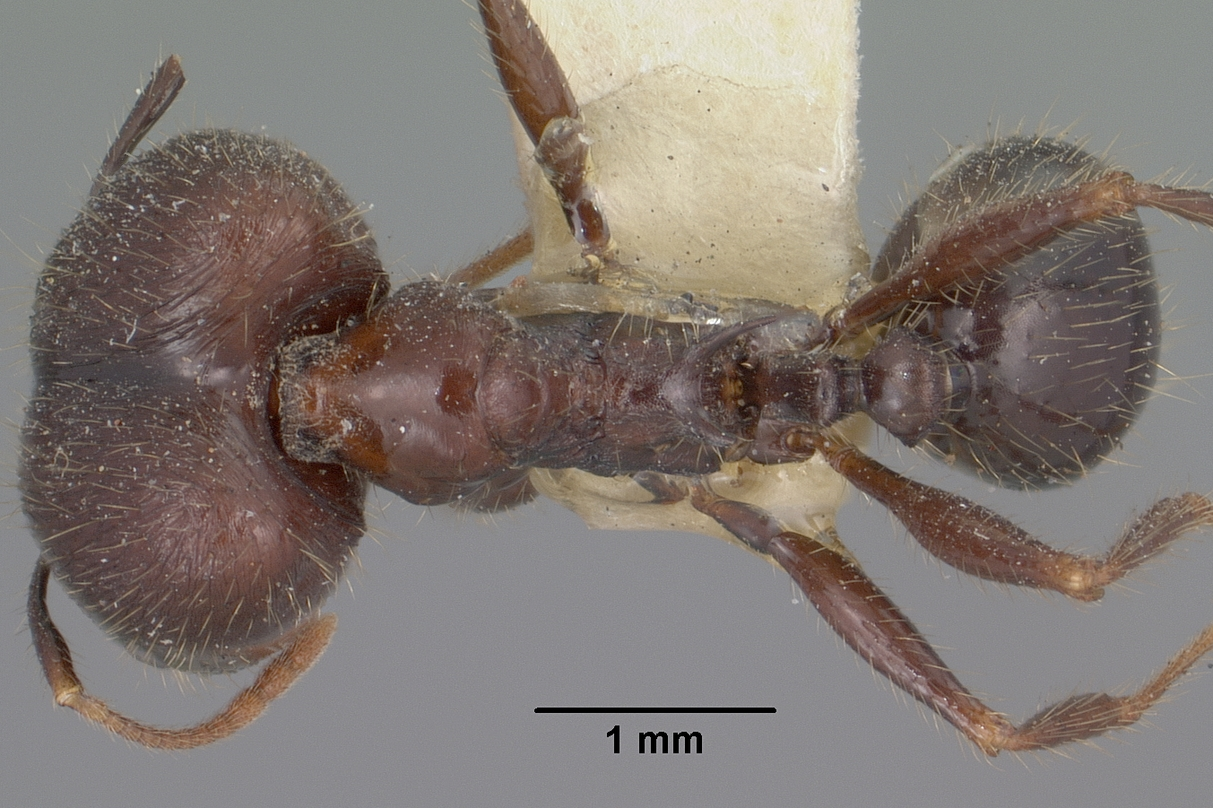
