= Pheidole rhinomontana =

Scientific classification
- Kingdom: Animalia
- Phylum: Arthropoda
- Class: Insecta
- Order: Hymenoptera
- Family: Formicidae
- Subfamily: Myrmicinae
- Genus: Pheidole
- Species: P. rhinomontana

Binomial name
- Pheidole rhinomontana Longino, 2009

Species of ant

Pheidole rhinomontana is a species of ant in the genus Pheidole. It was discovered and described by Longino, J. T. in 2009.
