= Pheidole leoncortesi =

Scientific classification
- Kingdom: Animalia
- Phylum: Arthropoda
- Class: Insecta
- Order: Hymenoptera
- Family: Formicidae
- Subfamily: Myrmicinae
- Genus: Pheidole
- Species: P. leoncortesi

Binomial name
- Pheidole leoncortesi Longino, J. T., 2009

Species of ant

Pheidole leoncortesi is a species of ant in the genus Pheidole. It was discovered and described by Longino, J. T. in 2009.
