= Pheidole gracilipes =

Scientific classification
- Kingdom: Animalia
- Phylum: Arthropoda
- Clade: Pancrustacea
- Class: Insecta
- Order: Hymenoptera
- Family: Formicidae
- Subfamily: Myrmicinae
- Genus: Pheidole
- Species: P. gracilipes

Binomial name
- Pheidole gracilipes (Motschoulsky, 1863)

Species of ant

Pheidole gracilipes is a species of ant in the subfamily Myrmicinae. It is found in Sri Lanka.
