= Pheidole psilogaster =

Scientific classification
- Kingdom: Animalia
- Phylum: Arthropoda
- Clade: Pancrustacea
- Class: Insecta
- Order: Hymenoptera
- Family: Formicidae
- Subfamily: Myrmicinae
- Genus: Pheidole
- Species: P. psilogaster

Binomial name
- Pheidole psilogaster Wilson, E. O., 2003

Species of ant

Pheidole psilogaster is a species of ant in the subfamily Myrmicinae. It is distributed across Mexico, Costa Rica, and Nicaragua.
