= Pheidole pronotalis =

Scientific classification
- Kingdom: Animalia
- Phylum: Arthropoda
- Clade: Pancrustacea
- Class: Insecta
- Order: Hymenoptera
- Family: Formicidae
- Subfamily: Myrmicinae
- Genus: Pheidole
- Species: P. pronotalis

Binomial name
- Pheidole pronotalis Forel, 1902

Species of ant

Pheidole pronotalis is a species of ant in the subfamily Myrmicinae. It is found in India, and Sri Lanka.
