= Pheidole phanigaster =

Scientific classification
- Kingdom: Animalia
- Phylum: Arthropoda
- Class: Insecta
- Order: Hymenoptera
- Family: Formicidae
- Subfamily: Myrmicinae
- Genus: Pheidole
- Species: P. phanigaster

Binomial name
- Pheidole phanigaster Longino, J. T., 2009

Species of ant

Pheidole phanigaster is a species of ant in the genus Pheidole. It was discovered and described by J.T. Longino in 2009.
