= Pheidole lanuginosa =

Conservation status
- Vulnerable (IUCN 2.3)

Scientific classification
- Kingdom: Animalia
- Phylum: Arthropoda
- Class: Insecta
- Order: Hymenoptera
- Family: Formicidae
- Subfamily: Myrmicinae
- Genus: Pheidole
- Species: P. lanuginosa

Binomial name
- Pheidole lanuginosa Wilson, 1984

Species of ant

Pheidole lanuginosa is a species of ant in the subfamily Myrmicinae. It is endemic to India.
