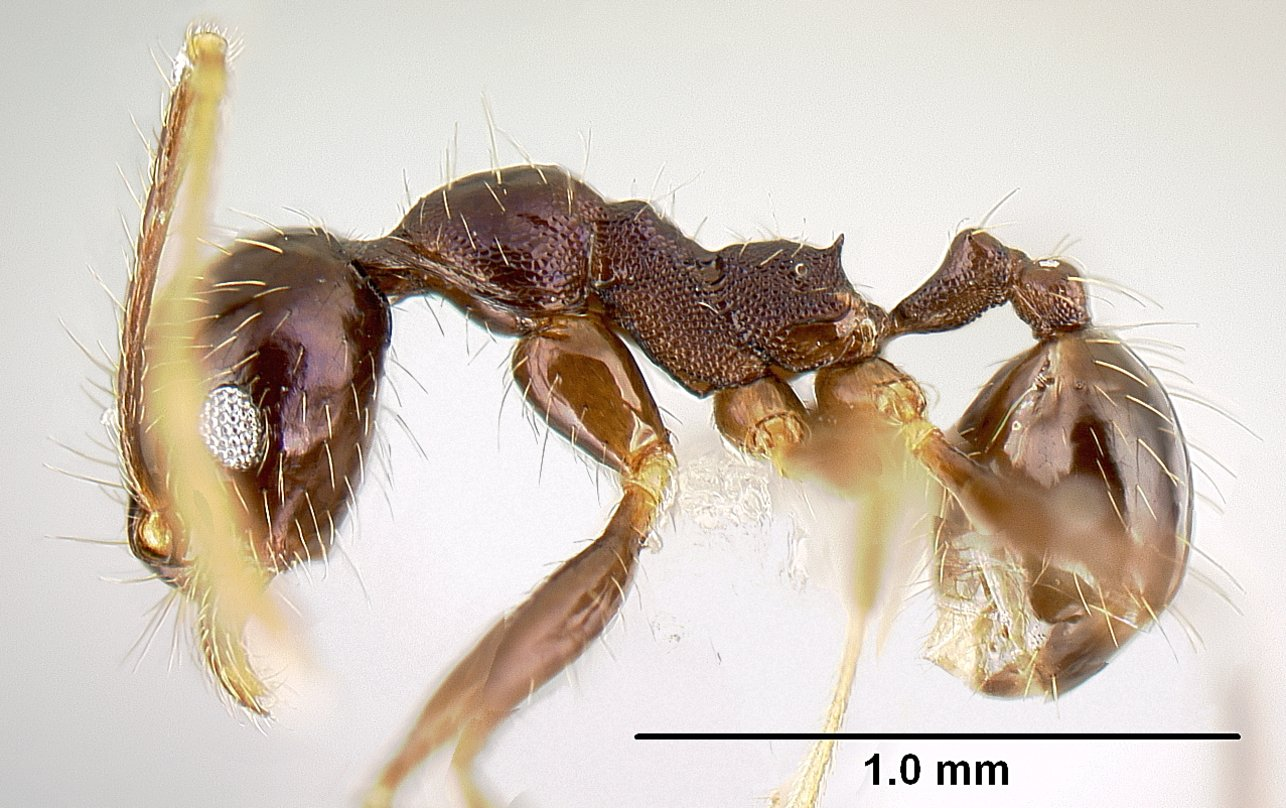
- P. purpurea minor worker photograph by John T. Longino and www.antweb.org

Scientific classification
- Kingdom: Animalia
- Phylum: Arthropoda
- Clade: Pancrustacea
- Class: Insecta
- Order: Hymenoptera
- Family: Formicidae
- Subfamily: Myrmicinae
- Genus: Pheidole
- Species: P. purpurea

Binomial name
- Pheidole purpurea J. T. Longino, 2009

= Pheidole purpurea =

Species of ant

Pheidole purpurea is a dimorphic species of ant found in Mexico and Central America. The species shows considerable variance in physical characteristics based on location, though some variance exists even within small populations. Some populations display a metallic, purple sheen.

== Dimorphic subdivision ==
Like many species of the genus Pheidole, P. purpurea is dimorphic, with workers visibly differentiated by head size and shape into "minor" and "major" (or soldier) workers. The head of the major worker can be as much as twice as long and more than twice as wide as that of the minor.

Minor and major workers of P. purpurea
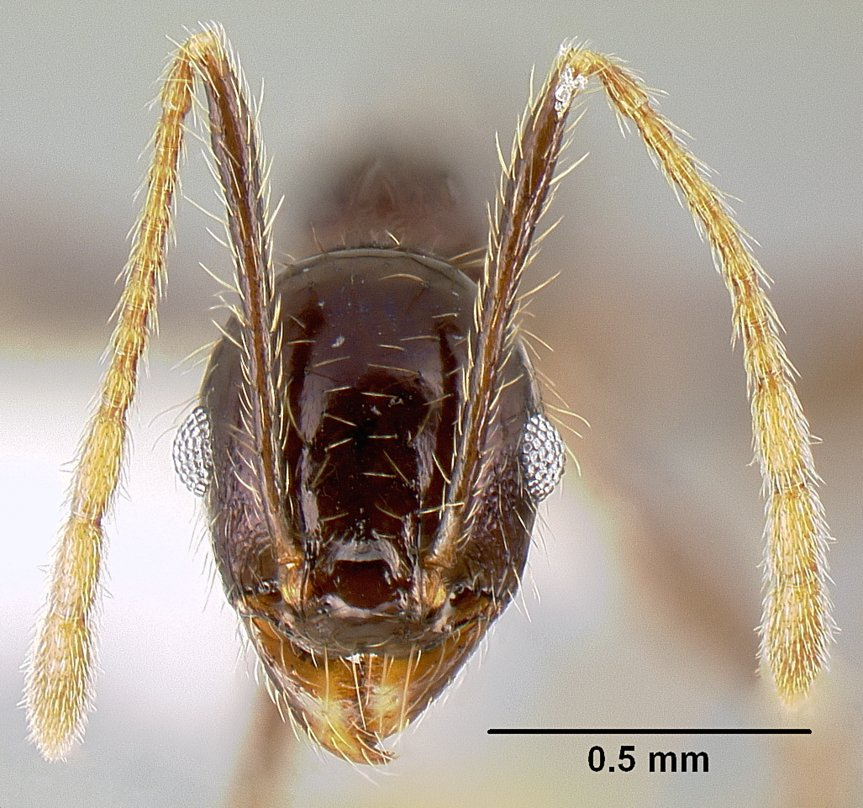
Minor worker
photograph by John T. Longino and www.antweb.org

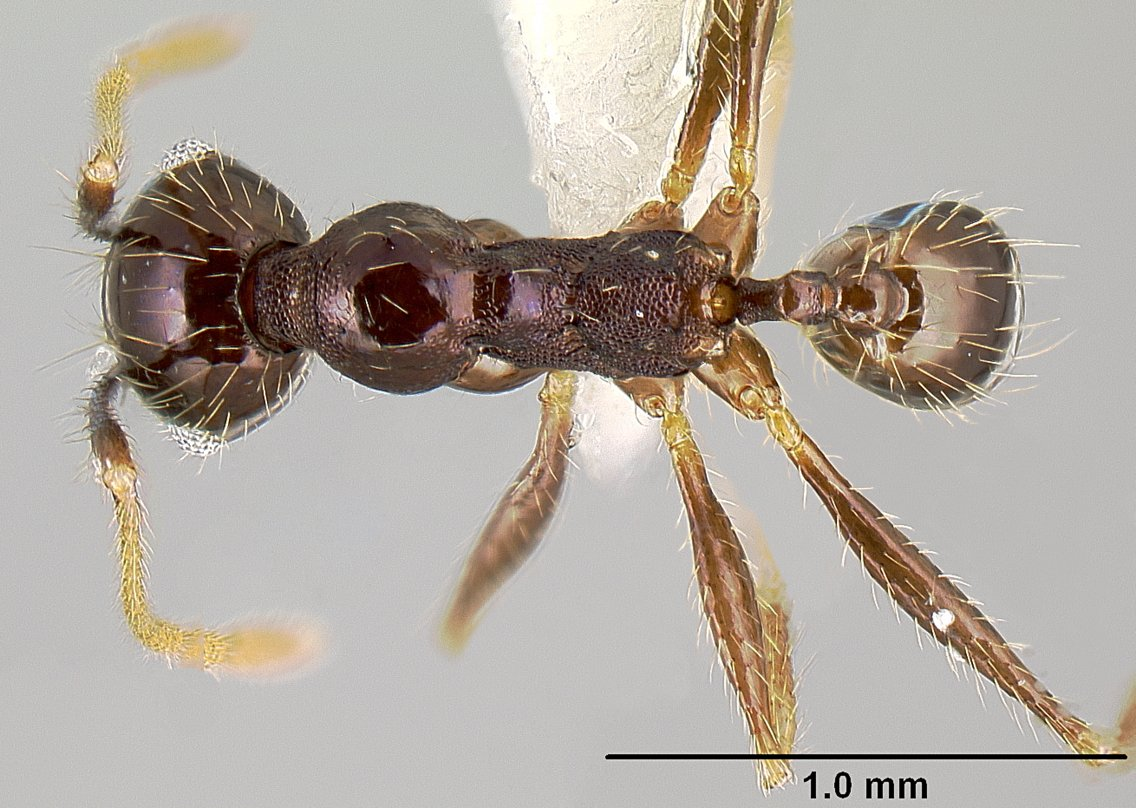
Minor worker, top
photograph by John T. Longino and www.antweb.org

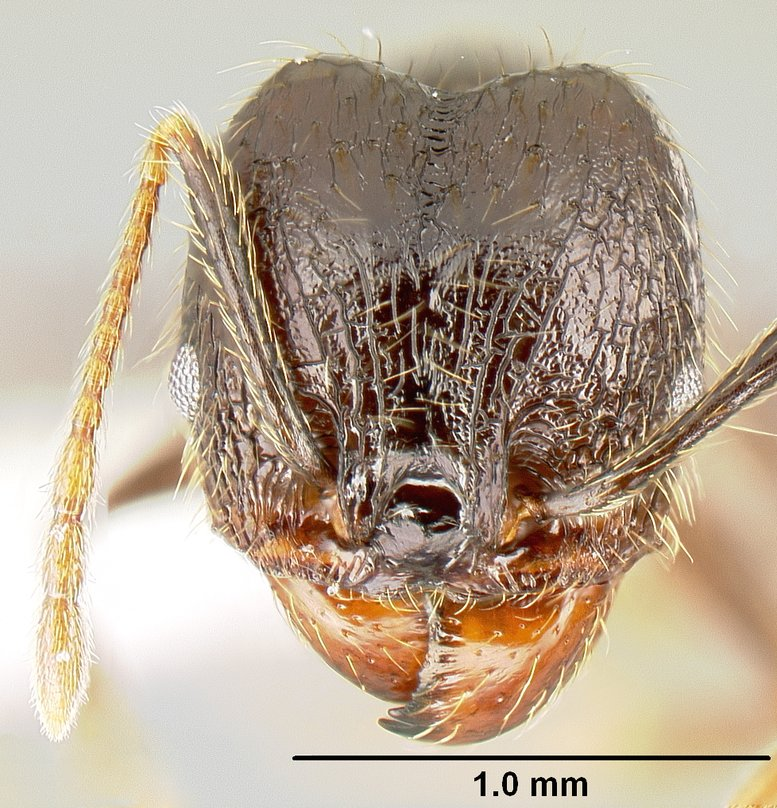
Major worker
photograph by John T. Longino and www.antweb.org

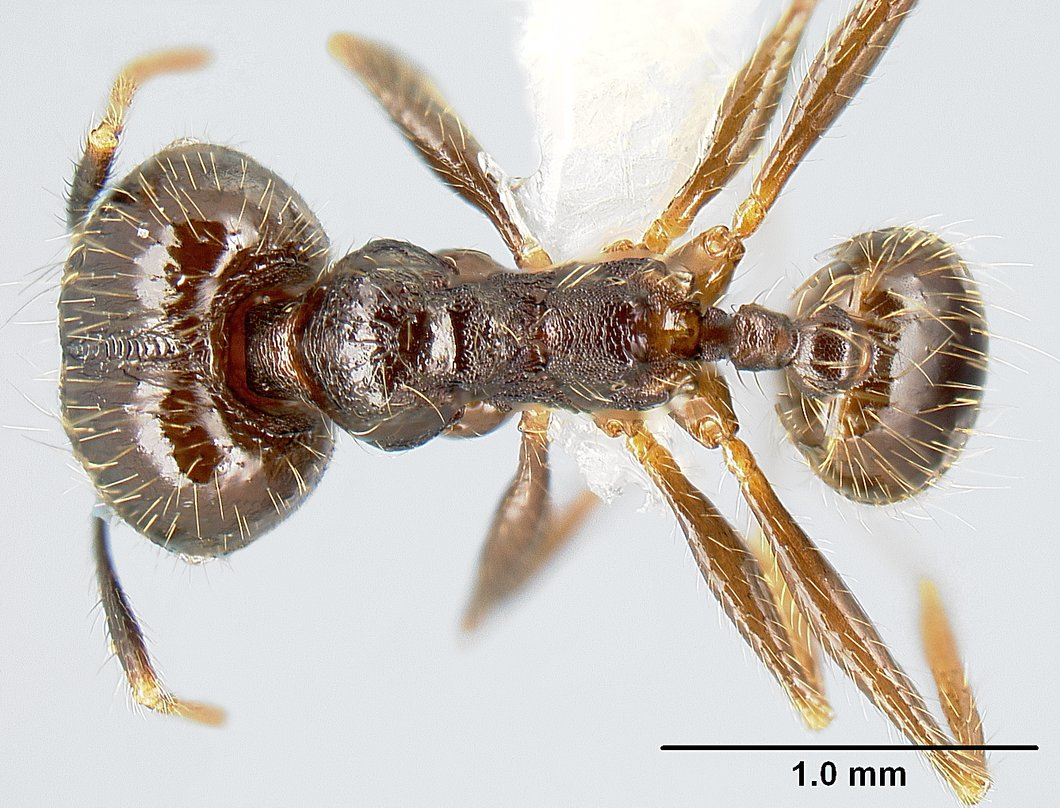
Major worker, top
photograph by John T. Longino and www.antweb.org
