= Pheidole decepticon =

Scientific classification
- Domain: Eukaryota
- Kingdom: Animalia
- Phylum: Arthropoda
- Class: Insecta
- Order: Hymenoptera
- Family: Formicidae
- Subfamily: Myrmicinae
- Genus: Pheidole
- Species: P. decepticon

Binomial name
- Pheidole decepticon Fischer & Fisher, 2013

Species of ant

Pheidole decepticon (named after the Decepticons from the toy line Transformers) is a species of ant in the subfamily Myrmicinae.

== Habitat and distribution ==
Pheidole decepticon is a relatively widespread megacephala group species on the islands neighboring Madagascar. It occurs on the Comoros (Anjouan Island), Mayotte, Juan de Nova Island, and on the Cosmoledo Atoll of the Seychelles, which is located about 415 km northeast of Mayotte. Morphologically very similar to P. megacephala and P. megatron, the three are the only megacephala group species currently encountered on the smaller islands. Other species, such as the previously reported P. punctulata, were not collected recently on any of the islands. On Anjouan Island P. decepticon occurs together with P. megacephala and P. megatron. The latter was collected in lowland dry forest, coastal scrub land, and in a coconut plantation, while P. decepticon was found in rainforest, lowland coastal forest, Casuarina forest, old settlements, coral karst scrubland, and along roadsides. Pheidole megacephala was not found in forested habitats on Anjouan, but was collected once from within a coastal village. Whether the other two species occur in direct sympatry, or if they are spatially or ecologically separated is not known.

== Description ==
The minor and major workers of P. decepticon are best separated from those of the other two species (P. megacephala and P. megatron) by their standing hairs, which are more abundant, fine and acute compared to the more sparsely distributed standing hairs that often end in blunt or bifurcate apices in P. megacephala and P. megatron. In addition, the postpetiolar ventral process of the major workers is less roundly convex and slightly smaller in the P. decepticon specimens.

== See also ==
- Pheidole megatron, another species with a name from the Transformers toyline
