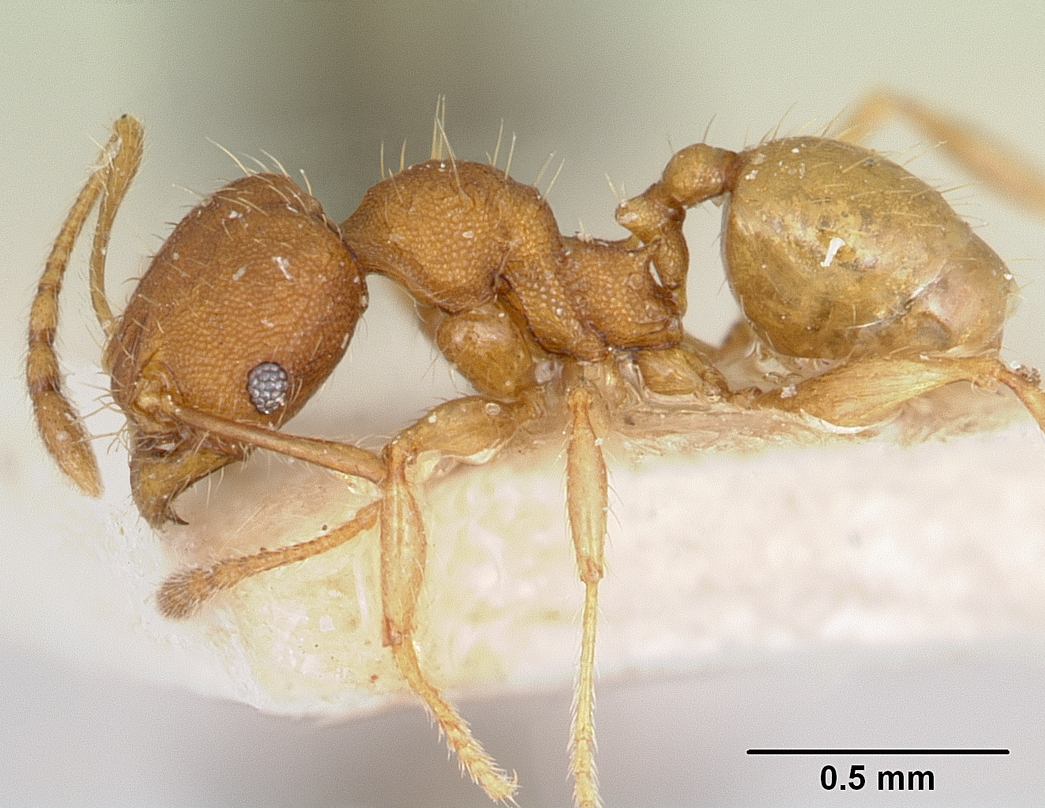
- P. jonas worker from Comoros

Scientific classification
- Domain: Eukaryota
- Kingdom: Animalia
- Phylum: Arthropoda
- Class: Insecta
- Order: Hymenoptera
- Family: Formicidae
- Subfamily: Myrmicinae
- Genus: Pheidole
- Species: P. jonas

Binomial name
- Pheidole jonas Forel, 1907

= Pheidole jonas =

Species of ant

Pheidole jonas is a species of ant in the subfamily Myrmicinae.

== Habitat and distribution ==
Pheidole jonas is known only from the Comoros Islands and Mayotte. It was collected mostly from rainforest leaf litter, but also from rotten logs, under moss, and above ground in rainforest and montane rainforest in elevations between 20 and 1235 m. The populations on Anjouan, Grand Comore, and Mayotte islands are morphologically distinct, but share enough characteristics with each other and with the original type material to be identified as a single species, until further research proves otherwise.

== Description ==
The specimens from Anjouan are all orange in color, like the types, whereas those from the other two islands are brown. The Grand Comore and Mayotte populations can be distinguished further by minor allometric differences in the head, pronotum and postpetiole. The majors from Grand Comore tend to have a slightly wider head and a wider postpetiole than those from Mayotte. P. jonas is probably closely related to P. vulcan and P. loki. The minor workers of P. jonas can be separated from those of P. vulcan by slightly longer mandibles, scapes, and postpetiole, while the majors have a lower promesonotal process with a conspicuously concave transverse groove in profile view. Standing hairs are significantly less abundant and less flexuous in both worker castes than in those of P. vulcan. The minor workers of P. loki (majors are unknown) can be easily distinguished from the two other species, as the scapes are on average longer and the sculpture on dorsal head and mesosoma is largely reduced, whereas the heads and mesosomas of P. jonas and P. vulcan possess comparatively strong punctures.
