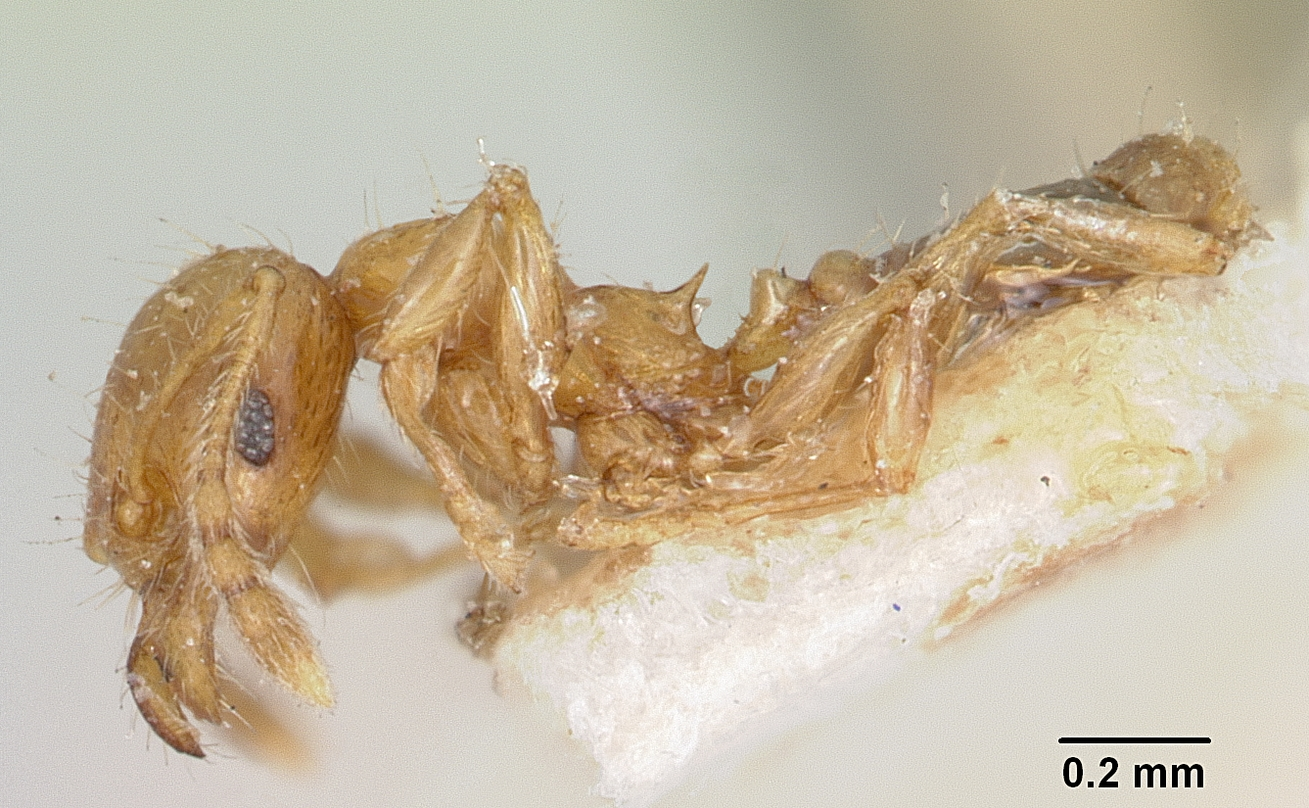
- P. braueri worker from the Seychelles

Scientific classification
- Domain: Eukaryota
- Kingdom: Animalia
- Phylum: Arthropoda
- Class: Insecta
- Order: Hymenoptera
- Family: Formicidae
- Subfamily: Myrmicinae
- Genus: Pheidole
- Species: P. braueri

Binomial name
- Pheidole braueri Forel, 1897

= Pheidole braueri =

Species of ant

Pheidole braueri is a species of ant in the subfamily Myrmicinae.

== Distribution ==
Pheidole braueri was described from specimens collected by August Bernhard Brauer who collected insects on Mahé and Silhouette islands, so the precise locality of the type series is unknown. However, subsequent collections are only from Silhouette Island. Thus, this species may be restricted to Silhouette Island.

== Related species ==
Based on similarities in external morphology, especially the head and body of the major worker, P. braueri seems to belong to a widespread group of morphologically related species. The geographic distribution of this potentially monophyletic species group ranges from the Seychelles in the Southwest Indian Ocean to Borneo and to several smaller islands in Micronesia and Melanesia in the South and West Pacific Ocean. This group contains several species with majors that resemble those of P. braueri in key characters including head morphology and the shape of the mesosoma and waist segments. Possibly related species are Pheidole philemon (Solomon Islands), P. hortensis (Borneo and Indonesia), P. maculifrons (Philippines), P. recondita (Guam), P. fantasia (Philippines), P. clypeocornis, P. kikutai, P. retivertex, P. rugifera, P. sayapensis, (these last five from Borneo), and P. tjibodana (Southeast Asia).

== Description ==
Intraspecifically P. braueri minor workers display a significant amount of variability in face and mesosoma sculpture. In contrast to a largely weak to superficial punctate sculpture in most specimens, the heads and mesosomas of the type material are almost entirely smooth and shiny. Despite these relatively distinct intraspecific differences, the morphology and measurements of the types, especially of the major workers, are identical to those of the more recently collected material.
