= List of Pheidole species =

This is a list of valid extant and fossil species of the ant genus Pheidole in the subfamily Myrmicinae. There are over 1,000 valid species in this genus.

== Extant species ==
=== A ===
- Pheidole aana Wilson & Taylor, 1967
- Pheidole abakytan Casadei-Ferreira et al., 2020
- Pheidole abaticanga Casadei-Ferreira et al., 2020
- Pheidole aberrans Mayr, 1868
- Pheidole absurda Forel, 1886
- Pheidole acamata Wilson, 2003
- Pheidole acantha Eguchi, 2001
- Pheidole accinota Wheeler, 1925
- Pheidole aciculata Wilson, 2003
- Pheidole aculifera Wilson, 2003
- Pheidole acutidens (Santschi, 1922)
- Pheidole acutilobata Mackay et al., 2011
- Pheidole ademonia Wilson, 2003
- Pheidole adrianoi Naves, 1985
- Pheidole aeberlii Forel, 1894
- Pheidole aelloea Salata & Fisher, 2020
- Pheidole aenescens Wilson, 2003
- Pheidole aequiseta Santschi, 1923
- Pheidole aglae Forel, 1913
- Pheidole agricola Wilson, 2003
- Pheidole ajax Forel, 1899
- Pheidole ajaxigibba Longino, 2019
- Pheidole akermani Arnold, 1920
- Pheidole ala Salata & Fisher, 2020
- Pheidole alacris Santschi, 1923
- Pheidole alayoi Wilson, 2003
- Pheidole albidula Santschi, 1928
- Pheidole albipes Wilson, 2003
- Pheidole alexeter Wilson, 2003
- Pheidole alfaroi Emery, 1896
- Pheidole alienata Borgmeier, 1929
- Pheidole alina Salata & Fisher, 2020
- Pheidole allani Bingham, 1903
- Pheidole allarmata Wilson, 2003
- Pheidole alpestris Wilson, 2003
- Pheidole alpinensis Forel, 1912
- Pheidole alticola Wilson, 2003
- Pheidole amabilis Wilson, 2003
- Pheidole amazonica Wilson, 2003
- Pheidole amber Donisthorpe, 1941
- Pheidole ambigua Wilson, 2003
- Pheidole ambohimanga Salata & Fisher, 2020
- Pheidole ambonensis Karavaiev, 1930
- Pheidole ampangabe Salata & Fisher, 2021
- Pheidole ampla Forel, 1893
- Pheidole amplificata Viehmeyer, 1914
- Pheidole analavelona Salata & Fisher, 2020
- Pheidole anastasii Emery, 1896
- Pheidole andapa Salata & Fisher, 2020
- Pheidole andersoni Longino, 2019
- Pheidole andohahela Salata & Fisher, 2020
- Pheidole andrieui Santschi, 1930
- Pheidole androsana Wheeler, 1905
- Pheidole angulicollis Eguchi, 2001
- Pheidole angulifera Wilson, 2003
- Pheidole angusta Forel, 1908
- Pheidole angusticeps Wilson, 2003
- Pheidole angustinigra Longino, 2019
- Pheidole anima Wilson, 2003
- Pheidole ankerana Salata & Fisher, 2020
- Pheidole annemariae Forel, 1918
- Pheidole annexa Eguchi, 2001
- Pheidole anomala Salata & Fisher, 2020
- Pheidole anosyenne Salata & Fisher, 2020
- Pheidole anthracina Forel, 1902
- Pheidole antillana Forel, 1893
- Pheidole antipodum (Smith, 1858)
- Pheidole antranohofa Salata & Fisher, 2020
- Pheidole antsahabe Salata & Fisher, 2020
- Pheidole aper Forel, 1912
- Pheidole aphrasta Zhou & Zheng, 1999
- Pheidole arachnion Wilson, 2003
- Pheidole araneoides Wilson, 2003
- Pheidole arboricola Wilson, 2003
- Pheidole arcifera Santschi, 1925
- Pheidole areniphila Forel, 1910
- Pheidole argentina (Bruch, 1932)
- Pheidole arhuaca Forel, 1901
- Pheidole ariel Wilson, 2003
- Pheidole aripoensis Wilson, 2003
- Pheidole aristotelis Forel, 1911
- Pheidole arivo Salata & Fisher, 2021
- Pheidole arnoldi Forel, 1913
- Pheidole aspera Mayr, 1862
- Pheidole asperata Emery, 1895
- Pheidole asperithorax Emery, 1894
- Pheidole aspidata Eguchi & Bui, 2005
- Pheidole astur Wilson, 2003
- Pheidole athertonensis Forel, 1915
- Pheidole atitlana Longino, 2019
- Pheidole atsirakambiaty Salata & Fisher, 2020
- Pheidole atticola Forel, 1912
- Pheidole atua Wilson & Taylor, 1967
- Pheidole aurea Wilson, 2003
- Pheidole aurivillii Mayr, 1896
- Pheidole auropilosa Mayr, 1887
- Pheidole avaratra Salata & Fisher, 2020
- Pheidole avia Forel, 1908
- Pheidole azteca Wilson, 2003

=== B ===
- Pheidole bajaensis Wilson, 2003
- Pheidole bakeri Forel, 1912
- Pheidole balatro Longino, 2019
- Pheidole balcanica Seifert, 2016
- Pheidole balzani Emery, 1894
- Pheidole bambusarum Forel, 1908
- Pheidole bandata Bharti, 2004
- Pheidole barbata Wheeler, 1908
- Pheidole barreleti Forel, 1903
- Pheidole barumtaun Donisthorpe, 1938
- Pheidole batrachorum Wheeler, 1922
- Pheidole beanka Salata & Fisher, 2020
- Pheidole beauforti Emery, 1911
- Pheidole befotaka Salata & Fisher, 2020
- Pheidole bellatrix Wilson, 2003
- Pheidole belli Mann, 1919
- Pheidole beloceps Wilson, 2003
- Pheidole belonorte Longino, 2019
- Pheidole bemarahaensis Salata & Fisher, 2020
- Pheidole bemarivoensis Salata & Fisher, 2020
- Pheidole bequaerti Forel, 1913
- Pheidole bergi Mayr, 1887
- Pheidole besalon Longino, 2019
- Pheidole bessonii Forel, 1891
- Pheidole bicarinata Mayr, 1870
- Pheidole biconstricta Mayr, 1870
- Pheidole bicornis Forel, 1899
- Pheidole bicornisculpta Longino, 2019
- Pheidole bidens Wilson, 2003
- Pheidole bifurca Donisthorpe, 1941
- Pheidole bigote Longino, 2009
- Pheidole bilimeki Mayr, 1870
- Pheidole biloba (Karavaiev, 1935)
- Pheidole binara Salata & Fisher, 2020
- Pheidole binasifera Wilson, 2003
- Pheidole binghamii Forel, 1902
- Pheidole biolleyi Forel, 1908
- Pheidole bison Wilson, 2003
- Pheidole blumenauensis Kempf, 1964
- Pheidole bluntschlii Forel, 1911
- Pheidole boliviana Wilson, 2003
- Pheidole boltoni Wilson, 2003
- Pheidole borgmeieri Kempf, 1972
- Pheidole boribora Salata & Fisher, 2020
- Pheidole boruca Wilson, 2003
- Pheidole bos Forel, 1893
- Pheidole brachyops Wilson, 2003
- Pheidole brandaoi Wilson, 2003
- Pheidole branstetteri Longino, 2009
- Pheidole braueri Forel, 1897
- Pheidole brevicona Mayr, 1887
- Pheidole brevicornis Salata & Fisher, 2020
- Pheidole brevipilosa Mayr, 1876
- Pheidole breviseta Santschi, 1919
- Pheidole brownampla Longino, 2019
- Pheidole browni Wilson, 2003
- Pheidole bruchella Forel, 1915
- Pheidole bruchi Forel, 1914
- Pheidole bruesi Wheeler, 1911
- Pheidole brunnescens Santschi, 1929
- Pheidole bucculenta Forel, 1908
- Pheidole buchholzi Mayr, 1901
- Pheidole bufo Wilson, 2003
- Pheidole bula Sarnat, 2008
- Pheidole bulliceps Wilson, 2003
- Pheidole bureni Wilson, 2003
- Pheidole butteli Forel, 1913

=== C ===
- Pheidole caffra Emery, 1895
- Pheidole cahui Longino, 2019
- Pheidole cairnsiana Forel, 1902
- Pheidole caldwelli Mann, 1921
- Pheidole calens Forel, 1901
- Pheidole californica Mayr, 1870
- Pheidole caliginosa Longino, 2019
- Pheidole calimana Wilson, 2003
- Pheidole caltrop Wilson, 2003
- Pheidole cameroni Mayr, 1887
- Pheidole camilla Wilson, 2003
- Pheidole camptostela Kempf, 1972
- Pheidole cangussu Casadei-Ferreira et al., 2020
- Pheidole capellinii Emery, 1887
- Pheidole capensis Mayr, 1862
- Pheidole capillata Emery, 1906
- Pheidole caracalla Wilson, 2003
- Pheidole carapuna Mann, 1916
- Pheidole carapunco Kusnezov, 1952
- Pheidole cardiella Wilson, 2003
- Pheidole cardinalis Wilson, 2003
- Pheidole caribbaea Wheeler, 1911
- Pheidole carinata Wilson, 2003
- Pheidole cariniceps Eguchi, 2001
- Pheidole carinitida Longino, 2019
- Pheidole carinote Longino, 2009
- Pheidole carrolli Naves, 1985
- Pheidole casta Wheeler, 1908
- Pheidole castanea (Smith, 1858)
- Pheidole cataphracta Wilson, 2003
- Pheidole cataractae Wheeler, 1916
- Pheidole caulicola Wilson, 2003
- Pheidole cavifrons Emery, 1906
- Pheidole cavigenis Wheeler, 1915
- Pheidole ceibana Wilson, 2003
- Pheidole celaena Wilson, 2003
- Pheidole centeotl Wheeler, 1914
- Pheidole cerebrosior Wheeler, 1915
- Pheidole ceres Wheeler, 1904
- Pheidole cerina Wilson, 2003
- Pheidole cervicornis Emery, 1900
- Pheidole ceylonica (Motschoulsky, 1863)
- Pheidole chalca Wheeler, 1914
- Pheidole charazana Wilson, 2003
- Pheidole cheesmanae Donisthorpe, 1941
- Pheidole chilensis Mayr, 1862
- Pheidole chocoensis Wilson, 2003
- Pheidole christinae Fischer et al., 2012
- Pheidole christopherseni Forel, 1912
- Pheidole chrysops Wilson, 2003
- Pheidole cicatricosa Stitz, 1917
- Pheidole citrina Wilson, 2003
- Pheidole clara Salata & Fisher, 2020
- Pheidole clavata (Emery, 1877)
- Pheidole claviscapa Santschi, 1925
- Pheidole clementensis Gregg, 1969
- Pheidole clydei Gregg, 1950
- Pheidole clypeocornis Eguchi, 2001
- Pheidole cockerelli Wheeler, 1908
- Pheidole coffeicola Borgmeier, 1934
- Pheidole colaensis Mann, 1921
- Pheidole colobopsis Mann, 1916
- Pheidole colpigaleata Eguchi, 2006
- Pheidole comata Smith, 1858
- Pheidole comosa Salata & Fisher, 2021
- Pheidole concentrica Forel, 1902
- Pheidole concinna Santschi, 1910
- Pheidole conficta Forel, 1902
- Pheidole confoedusta Wheeler, 1909
- Pheidole constanciae Forel, 1902
- Pheidole constipata Wheeler, 1908
- Pheidole coonoorensis Forel, 1902
- Pheidole coracina Wilson, 2003
- Pheidole cordiceps Mayr, 1868
- Pheidole corniclypeus Longino, 2019
- Pheidole cornicula Wilson, 2003
- Pheidole corticicola Santschi
- Pheidole costaricensis Longino, 2019
- Pheidole coveri Wilson, 2003
- Pheidole cramptoni Wheeler, 1916
- Pheidole crassicornis Emery, 1895
- Pheidole crassinoda Emery, 1895
- Pheidole creightoni Gregg, 1955
- Pheidole crinita Wilson, 2003
- Pheidole crozieri Wilson, 2003
- Pheidole cryptocera Emery, 1900
- Pheidole cubaensis Mayr, 1862
- Pheidole cuevasi Wilson, 2003
- Pheidole cuitensis Forel, 1910
- Pheidole cuprina Wilson, 2003
- Pheidole cursor Wilson, 2003
- Pheidole curupira Casadei-Ferreira et al., 2020
- Pheidole curvistriata Salata & Fisher, 2020
- Pheidole cusuco Longino, 2019
- Pheidole cyrtostela Wilson, 2003

=== D ===
- Pheidole dammermani Wheeler, 1924
- Pheidole daphne Wilson, 2003
- Pheidole darlingtoni Wheeler, 1936
- Pheidole darwini Fischer et al., 2012
- Pheidole dasos Salata & Fisher, 2020
- Pheidole dasypyx Wilson, 2003
- Pheidole davidsonae Wilson, 2003
- Pheidole davisi Wheeler, 1905
- Pheidole dea Santschi, 1921
- Pheidole debilis Longino, 2009
- Pheidole decarinata Santschi, 1929
- Pheidole deceptrix Forel, 1899
- Pheidole decollata Forel, 1892
- Pheidole defecta Santschi, 1923
- Pheidole deima Wilson, 2003
- Pheidole delicata Wilson, 2003
- Pheidole deltea Eguchi, 2001
- Pheidole demeter Wilson, 2003
- Pheidole dentata Mayr, 1886
- Pheidole dentigula Smith, 1927
- Pheidole depressinoda Longino, 2019
- Pheidole descolei Kusnezov, 1952
- Pheidole deserticola Forel, 1910
- Pheidole desertorum Wheeler, 1906
- Pheidole diabolus Wilson, 2003
- Pheidole diakritos Salata & Fisher, 2020
- Pheidole diana Forel, 1908
- Pheidole diffidens (Walker, 1859)
- Pheidole diffusa (Jerdon, 1851)
- Pheidole diligens (Smith, 1858)
- Pheidole dinophila Wilson, 2003
- Pheidole dione Forel, 1913
- Pheidole dispar (Forel, 1895)
- Pheidole distincta Donisthorpe, 1943
- Pheidole distorta Forel, 1899
- Pheidole diversipilosa Wheeler, 1908
- Pheidole dodo Fischer & Fisher, 2013
- Pheidole dolon Wilson, 2003
- Pheidole dorsata Wilson, 2003
- Pheidole dossena Wilson, 2003
- Pheidole drepanon Wilson, 2003
- Pheidole drogon Sarnat et al., 2016
- Pheidole dryas Wilson, 2003
- Pheidole dugasi Forel, 1911
- Pheidole dumicola Wilson, 2003
- Pheidole duneraensis Bharti, 2001
- Pheidole durionei Santschi, 1923
- Pheidole dwyeri Gregg, 1969
- Pheidole dyctiota Kempf, 1972

=== E ===
- Pheidole ectatommoides Wilson, 2003
- Pheidole ecuadorana Wilson, 2003
- Pheidole ehazoara Salata & Fisher, 2020
- Pheidole eidmanni Menozzi, 1926
- Pheidole elecebra (Wheeler, 1904)
- Pheidole elegans Donisthorpe, 1938
- Pheidole elisae Emery, 1900
- Pheidole elongicephala Eguchi, 2008
- Pheidole embolopyx Brown, 1968
- Pheidole emmae Forel, 1905
- Pheidole ensifera Forel, 1897
- Pheidole eosimilis Longino, 2019
- Pheidole eowilsoni Longino, 2009
- Pheidole eparmata Wilson, 2003
- Pheidole epetrion Wilson, 2003
- Pheidole epiphyta Longino, 2009
- Pheidole erato Mann, 1919
- Pheidole erethizon Wilson, 2003
- Pheidole eriophora Wilson, 2003
- Pheidole ernsti Forel, 1912
- Pheidole erratilis Wilson, 2003
- Pheidole escherichii Forel, 1910
- Pheidole euryscopa Wilson, 2003
- Pheidole exarata Emery, 1896
- Pheidole exasperata (Mayr, 1866)
- Pheidole excellens Mayr, 1862
- Pheidole excubitor Wilson, 2003
- Pheidole exigua Mayr, 1884
- Pheidole exquisita Wilson, 2003

=== F ===
- Pheidole fabricator (Smith, 1858)
- Pheidole fadli Sharaf, 2007
- Pheidole fallax Mayr, 1870
- Pheidole familiaparra Longino, 2019
- Pheidole fantasia Chapman, 1963
- Pheidole fatigata Bolton, 1995
- Pheidole feae Emery, 1895
- Pheidole fera Santschi, 1925
- Pheidole fergusoni Forel, 1902
- Pheidole ferruginea Salata & Fisher, 2020
- Pheidole fervens Smith, 1858
- Pheidole fervida Smith, 1874
- Pheidole fimbriata Roger, 1863
- Pheidole fincanaranjo Longino, 2019
- Pheidole fiorii Emery, 1890
- Pheidole fisaka Salata & Fisher, 2020
- Pheidole fissiceps Wilson, 2003
- Pheidole fitarata Salata & Fisher, 2020
- Pheidole flammea Salata & Fisher, 2020
- Pheidole flavens Roger, 1863
- Pheidole flaveria Zhou & Zheng, 1999
- Pheidole flavida Mayr, 1887
- Pheidole flavifrons Wilson, 2003
- Pheidole flavigaster Zhong, 2021
- Pheidole flavodepressa Salata & Fisher, 2020
- Pheidole flavominuta Salata & Fisher, 2020
- Pheidole flavothoracica Viehmeyer, 1914
- Pheidole floricola Wilson, 2003
- Pheidole floridana Emery, 1895
- Pheidole foreli Mayr, 1901
- Pheidole fortis Eguchi, 2006
- Pheidole fossimandibula Longino, 2009
- Pheidole foveolata Eguchi, 2006
- Pheidole fowleri Wilson, 2003
- Pheidole fracticeps Wilson, 2003
- Pheidole fullerae Wilson, 2003
- Pheidole funki LaPolla & Cover, 2005
- Pheidole funkikoensis Wheeler, 1929
- Pheidole furcata Sarnat, 2008
- Pheidole furtiva Wilson, 2003
- Pheidole fuscula Emery, 1900

=== G ===
- Pheidole gagates Wilson, 2003
- Pheidole gaigei Forel, 1914
- Pheidole galba Wilson, 2003
- Pheidole gambogia Donisthorpe, 1948
- Pheidole gatesi (Wheeler, 1927)
- Pheidole gauthieri Forel, 1901
- Pheidole gellibrandi Clark, 1934
- Pheidole geminata Wilson, 2003
- Pheidole gemmula Wilson, 2003
- Pheidole geraesensis Santschi, 1929
- Pheidole germaini Emery, 1896
- Pheidole gertrudae Forel, 1886
- Pheidole ghatica Forel, 1902
- Pheidole ghigii Emery, 1900
- Pheidole gibba Mayr, 1887
- Pheidole gibbata Borgmeier, 1934
- Pheidole gigaflavens Wilson, 2003
- Pheidole gigas Wilson, 2003
- Pheidole gilva Wilson, 2003
- Pheidole gilvescens Creighton & Gregg, 1955
- Pheidole glabra Salata & Fisher, 2020
- Pheidole glabrella Fischer et al., 2012
- Pheidole globularia Wilson, 2003
- Pheidole glomericeps Wilson, 2003
- Pheidole gnomus Wilson, 2003
- Pheidole goavana Salata & Fisher, 2020
- Pheidole godmani Forel, 1893
- Pheidole goeldii Forel, 1895
- Pheidole gombakensis Eguchi, 2001
- Pheidole gouldi Forel, 1886
- Pheidole gracilescens (Smith, 1860)
- Pheidole gracilipes (Motschoulsky, 1863)
- Pheidole gracilis Salata & Fisher, 2020
- Pheidole grallatrix Emery, 1899
- Pheidole grandinodus Wilson, 2003
- Pheidole granulata Pergande, 1896
- Pheidole gravida Wilson, 2003
- Pheidole grayi Forel, 1902
- Pheidole grex Wilson, 2003
- Pheidole grundmanni Smith, 1953
- Pheidole guajirana Wilson, 2003
- Pheidole guayasana Wilson, 2003
- Pheidole guerrerana Wilson, 2003
- Pheidole guilelmimuelleri Forel, 1886
- Pheidole guineensis (Fabricius, 1793)
- Pheidole gulo Wilson, 2003
- Pheidole gymnoceras Longino, 2009

=== H ===
- Pheidole haboka Salata & Fisher, 2020
- Pheidole hainanensis Chen et al., 2011
- Pheidole hamtoni Wilson, 2003
- Pheidole hansoni Longino, 2019
- Pheidole harlequina Wilson, 2003
- Pheidole harrisonfordi Wilson, 2003
- Pheidole hartmeyeri Forel, 1907
- Pheidole haskinsorum Wilson, 2003
- Pheidole hasticeps Wilson, 2003
- Pheidole havilandi Forel, 1911
- Pheidole havoana Salata & Fisher, 2020
- Pheidole haywardi Kusnezov, 1952
- Pheidole hazenae Wilson, 2003
- Pheidole hazo Salata & Fisher, 2020
- Pheidole hecate Wheeler, 1911
- Pheidole hector Wilson, 2003
- Pheidole hectornitida Longino, 2019
- Pheidole hedlundorum Wilson, 2003
- Pheidole heliosa Fischer et al., 2012
- Pheidole hercules Donisthorpe, 1941
- Pheidole heterothrix Santschi, 1923
- Pheidole hetschkoi Emery, 1896
- Pheidole hewitti Santschi, 1932
- Pheidole heyeri Forel, 1899
- Pheidole hierax Wilson, 2003
- Pheidole hirsuta Emery, 1896
- Pheidole hispaniolae Wilson, 2003
- Pheidole hitoy Longino, 2019
- Pheidole hizemops Wilson, 2003
- Pheidole hoelldobleri Wilson, 2003
- Pheidole hongkongensis Wheeler, 1928
- Pheidole hoplitica Wilson, 2003
- Pheidole horni Emery, 1901
- Pheidole horribilis Wilson, 2003
- Pheidole hortensis Forel, 1913
- Pheidole hortonae Wilson, 2003
- Pheidole hospes Smith, 1865
- Pheidole hospita Bingham, 1903
- Pheidole huacana Wilson, 2003
- Pheidole huarache Longino, 2019
- Pheidole huberi Forel, 1911
- Pheidole huilana Wilson, 2003
- Pheidole humeralis Wheeler, 1908
- Pheidole humeridens Wilson, 2003
- Pheidole hyatti Emery, 1895

=== I ===
- Pheidole iceni Fernández, 2011
- Pheidole idiota Santschi, 1923
- Pheidole imbrilis Longino, 2019
- Pheidole impressa Mayr, 1870
- Pheidole impressiceps Mayr, 1876
- Pheidole inca Wilson, 2003
- Pheidole incerta (Smith, 1863)
- Pheidole incisa Mayr, 1870
- Pheidole incurvata Viehmeyer, 1924
- Pheidole indagarama Longino, 2019
- Pheidole indagatrix Wilson, 2003
- Pheidole indica Mayr, 1879
- Pheidole indosinensis Wheeler, 1928
- Pheidole industa Santschi, 1939
- Pheidole infernalis Wilson, 2003
- Pheidole innotata Mayr, 1866
- Pheidole innupta Menozzi, 1931
- Pheidole inornata Eguchi, 2001
- Pheidole inquilina (Wheeler, 1903)
- Pheidole inscrobiculata Viehmeyer, 1916
- Pheidole insipida Forel, 1899
- Pheidole inversa Forel, 1901
- Pheidole irritans (Smith, 1858)
- Pheidole isis Mann, 1919
- Pheidole itremo Salata & Fisher, 2020

=== J ===
- Pheidole jacobsoni Forel, 1911
- Pheidole jaculifera Wilson, 2003
- Pheidole jamaicensis Wheeler, 1908
- Pheidole janzeni Longino, 2009
- Pheidole jeannei Wilson, 2003
- Pheidole jelskii Mayr, 1884
- Pheidole jivaro Wilson, 2003
- Pheidole joffreville Salata & Fisher, 2020
- Pheidole jolalpanensis Vázquez-Franco, 2024
- Pheidole jonas Forel, 1907
- Pheidole jordanica Saulcy, 1874
- Pheidole jubilans Forel, 1911
- Pheidole jucunda Forel, 1885
- Pheidole jujuyensis Forel, 1913
- Pheidole juniperae Wilson, 2003

=== K ===
- Pheidole karolmorae Longino, 2009
- Pheidole karolsetosa Longino, 2009
- Pheidole kasparii Longino, 2019
- Pheidole katonae Forel, 1907
- Pheidole kava Fischer et al., 2016
- Pheidole keftiuensis Borowiec & Salata, 2025
- Pheidole kelainos Longino, 2019
- Pheidole kely Salata & Fisher, 2020
- Pheidole kikutai Eguchi, 2001
- Pheidole kitschneri Forel, 1910
- Pheidole klaman Gómez et al., 2022
- Pheidole knowlesi Mann, 1921
- Pheidole kochi (Emery, 1911)
- Pheidole kohli Mayr, 1901
- Pheidole komori Fischer & Fisher, 2013
- Pheidole koshewnikovi Ruzsky, 1905
- Pheidole kugleri Wilson, 2003
- Pheidole kukrana Wilson, 2003
- Pheidole kuna Wilson, 2003
- Pheidole kusnezovi Wilson, 2003

=== L ===
- Pheidole laelaps Wilson, 2003
- Pheidole laevicolor Eguchi, 2006
- Pheidole laevifrons Mayr, 1887
- Pheidole laevinota Forel, 1908
- Pheidole laevithorax Eguchi, 2008
- Pheidole laeviventris Mayr, 1870
- Pheidole laevivertex Forel, 1901
- Pheidole lagunculiminor Longino, 2019
- Pheidole lagunculinoda Longino, 2009
- Pheidole laidlowi Mann, 1916
- Pheidole lamancha Longino, 2019
- Pheidole lamellinoda Forel, 1902
- Pheidole lamia Wheeler, 1901
- Pheidole laminata Emery, 1900
- Pheidole lamperos Salata & Fisher, 2020
- Pheidole lancifera Wilson, 2003
- Pheidole lanigera Wilson, 2003
- Pheidole lanuginosa Wilson, 1984
- Pheidole laselva Wilson, 2003
- Pheidole laselvoides Longino, 2019
- Pheidole laticrista Santschi, 1916
- Pheidole latinoda Roger, 1863
- Pheidole latiscava Vázquez-Franco, 2024
- Pheidole lattkei Wilson, 2003
- Pheidole laudatana Wilson, 2003
- Pheidole lavasoa Salata & Fisher, 2020
- Pheidole leloi Eguchi & Bui, 2016
- Pheidole lemnisca Wilson, 2003
- Pheidole lemur Forel, 1912
- Pheidole leoncortesi Longino, 2009
- Pheidole leonina Wilson, 2003
- Pheidole leptina Wilson, 2003
- Pheidole liengmei Forel, 1894
- Pheidole lignicola Mayr, 1887
- Pheidole lilloi (Kusnezov, 1952)
- Pheidole lineafrons Longino, 2019
- Pheidole liteae Forel, 1910
- Pheidole litigiosa Forel, 1892
- Pheidole littoralis Cole, 1952
- Pheidole lobulata Emery, 1900
- Pheidole loki Fischer & Fisher, 2013
- Pheidole lokitae Forel, 1913
- Pheidole longiceps Mayr, 1876
- Pheidole longicornis Emery, 1888
- Pheidole longinoi Wilson, 2003
- Pheidole longior Santschi, 1933
- Pheidole longipes (Latreille, 1802)
- Pheidole longipilosa Salata & Fisher, 2020
- Pheidole longiscapa Forel, 1901
- Pheidole longiseta Wilson, 2003
- Pheidole longispinosa Forel, 1891
- Pheidole lourothi Wilson, 2003
- Pheidole lovejoyi Wilson, 2003
- Pheidole lucaris Wilson, 2003
- Pheidole lucida Forel, 1895
- Pheidole lucioccipitalis Eguchi, 2001
- Pheidole lucretii Santschi, 1923
- Pheidole lupus Wilson, 2003
- Pheidole lustrata Wilson, 2003
- Pheidole lutea Salata & Fisher, 2020
- Pheidole luteagossamer Longino, 2019
- Pheidole luteipes Emery, 1914
- Pheidole lutzi Forel, 1905

=== M ===
- Pheidole macclendoni Wheeler, 1908
- Pheidole machaquila Longino, 2019
- Pheidole machetula Wilson, 2003
- Pheidole mackayi Wilson, 2003
- Pheidole macracantha Wilson, 2003
- Pheidole macromischoides Wilson, 2003
- Pheidole macrops Wilson, 2003
- Pheidole maculifrons Wheeler, 1929
- Pheidole madecassa Forel, 1892
- Pheidole madinika Salata & Fisher, 2020
- Pheidole madrensis Wilson, 2003
- Pheidole magna Eguchi, 2006
- Pheidole magrettii Emery, 1887
- Pheidole mahaboensis Salata & Fisher, 2020
- Pheidole mahamavo Salata & Fisher, 2020
- Pheidole mainty Salata & Fisher, 2020
- Pheidole maizina Salata & Fisher, 2020
- Pheidole maja Forel, 1886
- Pheidole makaensis Salata & Fisher, 2020
- Pheidole makilingi Viehmeyer, 1916
- Pheidole makirovana Salata & Fisher, 2020
- Pheidole malabarica (Jerdon, 1851)
- Pheidole malinsii Forel, 1902
- Pheidole mallota Wilson, 2003
- Pheidole mamirapiratra Salata & Fisher, 2021
- Pheidole mamiratra Salata & Fisher, 2020
- Pheidole mamore Mann, 1916
- Pheidole manantenensis Salata & Fisher, 2020
- Pheidole manantenina Salata & Fisher, 2020
- Pheidole mantadia Salata & Fisher, 2020
- Pheidole mantadioflava Salata & Fisher, 2020
- Pheidole manteroi Emery, 1897
- Pheidole mantilla Wilson, 2003
- Pheidole manuana Wilson, 2003
- Pheidole manukana Eguchi, 2001
- Pheidole mapinguari Casadei-Ferreira et al., 2020
- Pheidole marcidula Wheeler, 1908
- Pheidole marieannae Salata & Fisher, 2020
- Pheidole marmor Longino, 2019
- Pheidole maro Salata & Fisher, 2020
- Pheidole masoala Salata & Fisher, 2020
- Pheidole masoandro Salata & Fisher, 2020
- Pheidole maufei Arnold, 1920
- Pheidole mavesatra Salata & Fisher, 2020
- Pheidole mavohavoana Salata & Fisher, 2020
- Pheidole mayri Forel, 1894
- Pheidole medioflava Donisthorpe, 1941
- Pheidole megacephala (Fabricius, 1793)
- Pheidole megatron Fischer & Fisher, 2013
- Pheidole meihuashanensis Li & Chen, 1992
- Pheidole meinerti Forel, 1905
- Pheidole meinertopsis Wilson, 2003
- Pheidole melanogaster Donisthorpe, 1943
- Pheidole melastomae Wilson, 2003
- Pheidole mena Salata & Fisher, 2021
- Pheidole mendanai Mann, 1919
- Pheidole mendicula Mann, 1919
- Pheidole mentita Santschi, 1914
- Pheidole mera Wilson, 2003
- Pheidole merimbun Eguchi, 2001
- Pheidole mesomontana Longino, 2009
- Pheidole metallescens Emery, 1895
- Pheidole metana Wilson, 2003
- Pheidole micon Wilson, 2003
- Pheidole micridris Wilson, 2003
- Pheidole microgyna Wheeler, 1928
- Pheidole microps Wilson, 2003
- Pheidole micula Wheeler, 1915
- Pheidole midas Wilson, 2003
- Pheidole midongy Salata & Fisher, 2020
- Pheidole mikros Salata & Fisher, 2020
- Pheidole militicida Wheeler, 1915
- Pheidole minax Wilson, 2003
- Pheidole minensis Santschi, 1923
- Pheidole minima Mayr, 1901
- Pheidole minor (Jerdon, 1851)
- Pheidole minuscula Bernard, 1953
- Pheidole minutula Mayr, 1878
- Pheidole mirabilis Wilson, 2003
- Pheidole miramila Salata & Fisher, 2020
- Pheidole miseranda Wheeler, 1924
- Pheidole mittermeieri Wilson, 2003
- Pheidole mivory Salata & Fisher, 2020
- Pheidole mixteca Wilson, 2003
- Pheidole mjobergi Forel, 1915
- Pheidole modiglianii Emery, 1900
- Pheidole moerens Wheeler, 1908
- Pheidole moffetti Wilson, 2003
- Pheidole monstrosa Wilson, 2003
- Pheidole montana Eguchi, 1999
- Pheidole monteverdensis Wilson, 2003
- Pheidole moramanaensis Salata & Fisher, 2020
- Pheidole morelosana Wilson, 2003
- Pheidole morrisii Forel, 1886
- Pheidole moseni Wheeler, 1925
- Pheidole mosenopsis Wilson, 2003
- Pheidole moskitia Longino, 2019
- Pheidole multidens Forel, 1902
- Pheidole multispina Wilson, 2003
- Pheidole muralla Longino, 2019
- Pheidole mus Forel, 1902
- Pheidole musacolor Longino, 2019
- Pheidole musinermis Longino, 2019
- Pheidole mutisi Fernández & Wilson, 2008

=== N ===
- Pheidole nana Emery, 1894
- Pheidole naoroji Forel, 1902
- Pheidole napoensis Wilson, 2003
- Pheidole nasifera Wilson, 2003
- Pheidole nasutoides Hölldobler & Wilson, 1992
- Pheidole natalie Longino, 2019
- Pheidole navigans Forel, 1901
- Pheidole navoatrensis Salata & Fisher, 2020
- Pheidole naylae Wilson, 2003
- Pheidole nebulosa Wilson, 2003
- Pheidole nemoralis Forel, 1892
- Pheidole neokohli Wilson, 1984
- Pheidole neolongiceps Brown, 1950
- Pheidole neolongiscapa Özdikmen, 2010
- Pheidole neoschultzi LaPolla, 2006
- Pheidole nephele Longino, 2019
- Pheidole nesiota Wilson, 2003
- Pheidole nietneri Emery, 1901
- Pheidole nigella Emery, 1894
- Pheidole nigeriensis Santschi, 1914
- Pheidole nigricula Wilson, 2003
- Pheidole nigritella Bernard, 1953
- Pheidole nimba Bernard, 1953
- Pheidole nindi Mann, 1919
- Pheidole nitella Wilson, 2003
- Pheidole nitidicollis Emery, 1896
- Pheidole nitidobruna Salata & Fisher, 2020
- Pheidole nitidula Emery, 1888
- Pheidole njassae Viehmeyer, 1914
- Pheidole noar Wilson, 2003
- Pheidole nodgii Forel, 1905
- Pheidole nodifera (Smith, 1858)
- Pheidole nodus Smith, 1874
- Pheidole nubicola Wilson, 2003
- Pheidole nubila Emery, 1906
- Pheidole nuculiceps Wheeler, 1908

=== O ===
- Pheidole oaxacana Wilson, 2003
- Pheidole obapara Casadei-Ferreira et al., 2020
- Pheidole obnixa Forel, 1912
- Pheidole obrima Wilson, 2003
- Pheidole obscurifrons Santschi, 1925
- Pheidole obscurior Forel, 1886
- Pheidole obscurithorax Naves, 1985
- Pheidole obturaculum Longino, 2019
- Pheidole obtusopilosa Mayr, 1887
- Pheidole obtusospinosa Pergande, 1896
- Pheidole occipitalis André, 1890
- Pheidole oceanica Mayr, 1866
- Pheidole ocellata Zhou, 2001
- Pheidole ochracea Eguchi, 2008
- Pheidole oculata (Emery, 1899)
- Pheidole ocypodea Salata & Fisher, 2020
- Pheidole oliveirai Wilson, 2003
- Pheidole olsoni Wilson, 2003
- Pheidole onifera Mann, 1921
- Pheidole onyx Wilson, 2003
- Pheidole opaciventris Mayr, 1876
- Pheidole optiva Forel, 1901
- Pheidole orbica Forel, 1893
- Pheidole oswaldi Forel, 1891
- Pheidole otisi Wilson, 2003
- Pheidole ovalinoda Salata & Fisher, 2020
- Pheidole oxyops Forel, 1908

=== P ===
- Pheidole paiute Gregg, 1959
- Pheidole palenquensis Wilson, 2003
- Pheidole pallidula (Nylander, 1849)
- Pheidole pampana Santschi, 1929
- Pheidole paraensis Wilson, 2003
- Pheidole paranana Santschi, 1925
- Pheidole pararugiceps Longino, 2009
- Pheidole parasitica Wilson, 1984
- Pheidole pariana Wilson, 2003
- Pheidole parva Mayr, 1865
- Pheidole parvicorpus Eguchi, 2001
- Pheidole parviocula Salata & Fisher, 2020
- Pheidole parvula Salata & Fisher, 2020
- Pheidole parvulogibba Salata & Fisher, 2020
- Pheidole passivaeferox Longino, 2019
- Pheidole peckorum Wilson, 2003
- Pheidole pedana Wilson, 2003
- Pheidole pegasus Sarnat, 2008
- Pheidole peguensis Emery, 1895
- Pheidole pelor Wilson, 2003
- Pheidole peltastes Wilson, 2003
- Pheidole penetralis Smith, 1863
- Pheidole pepo Wilson, 2003
- Pheidole peregrina Wheeler, 1916
- Pheidole perissothrix Longino, 2019
- Pheidole perkinsi Wilson, 2003
- Pheidole perpilosa Wilson, 2003
- Pheidole perpusilla Emery, 1894
- Pheidole perryorum Wilson, 2003
- Pheidole peruviana Wilson, 2003
- Pheidole petax Forel, 1895
- Pheidole phanigaster Longino, 2009
- Pheidole philemon Forel, 1910
- Pheidole philippi Emery, 1915
- Pheidole phipsoni Forel, 1902
- Pheidole pholeops Wilson, 2003
- Pheidole piceonigra Emery, 1922
- Pheidole picobarva Longino, 2009
- Pheidole pidax Wilson, 2003
- Pheidole pieli Santschi, 1925
- Pheidole pilifera (Roger, 1863)
- Pheidole pilispina Wilson, 2003
- Pheidole piliventris (Smith, 1858)
- Pheidole pilosior Wilson, 2003
- Pheidole pinealis Wheeler, 1908
- Pheidole pinicola Wilson, 2003
- Pheidole plagiaria Smith, 1860
- Pheidole planidorsum Eguchi, 2001
- Pheidole planifrons Santschi, 1920
- Pheidole plato Wilson, 2003
- Pheidole platypus Crawley, 1915
- Pheidole platyscapa Longino, 2019
- Pheidole plebecula Forel, 1899
- Pheidole plinii Forel, 1911
- Pheidole podargea Salata & Fisher, 2020
- Pheidole polita Emery, 1894
- Pheidole polymorpha Wilson, 2003
- Pheidole porcula Wheeler, 1908
- Pheidole poringensis Eguchi, 2001
- Pheidole portalensis Wilson, 2003
- Pheidole potosiana Wilson, 2003
- Pheidole praegrandis Salata & Fisher, 2020
- Pheidole praeses Wilson, 2003
- Pheidole praeusta Roger, 1863
- Pheidole prattorum Wilson, 2003
- Pheidole prelli Forel, 1911
- Pheidole probolonotum Longino, 2019
- Pheidole pronotalis Forel, 1902
- Pheidole prostrata Wilson, 2003
- Pheidole protaxi Longino, 2019
- Pheidole protea Forel, 1912
- Pheidole protensa Wilson, 2003
- Pheidole providens (Sykes, 1835)
- Pheidole proxima Mayr, 1876
- Pheidole psammophila Creighton & Gregg, 1955
- Pheidole psilogaster Wilson, 2003
- Pheidole pubiventris Mayr, 1887
- Pheidole pugnax Dalla Torre, 1892
- Pheidole pulchella Santschi, 1910
- Pheidole pullula Santschi, 1911
- Pheidole punctatissima Mayr, 1870
- Pheidole punctithorax Borgmeier, 1929
- Pheidole punctulata Mayr, 1866
- Pheidole purpurascens Emery, 1897
- Pheidole purpurea Longino, 2009
- Pheidole puttemansi Forel, 1911
- Pheidole pygmaea Wilson, 2003

=== Q ===
- Pheidole quadrensis Forel, 1900
- Pheidole quadriceps Wilson, 2003
- Pheidole quadricuspis Emery, 1900
- Pheidole quadriprojecta Smith, 1947
- Pheidole quadrispinosa (Smith, 1865)
- Pheidole quercicola Wilson, 2003
- Pheidole quiaccana Wheeler, 1925
- Pheidole quinata Eguchi, 2000

=== R ===
- Pheidole rabo Forel, 1913
- Pheidole radoszkowskii Mayr, 1884
- Pheidole ragnax Fischer & Fisher, 2013
- Pheidole ranohirensis Salata & Fisher, 2020
- Pheidole rebeccae Fischer et al., 2012
- Pheidole reclusi Forel, 1899
- Pheidole recondita Clouse, 2007
- Pheidole rectisentis Wilson, 2003
- Pheidole rectispina Wilson, 2003
- Pheidole rectitrudis Wilson, 2003
- Pheidole reflexans Santschi, 1933
- Pheidole reichenspergeri Santschi, 1923
- Pheidole renae Wilson, 2003
- Pheidole renirano Salata & Fisher, 2020
- Pheidole retivertex Eguchi, 2001
- Pheidole retronitens Santschi, 1930
- Pheidole rhea Wheeler, 1908
- Pheidole rhinoceros Forel, 1899
- Pheidole rhinomontana Longino, 2009
- Pheidole rhytifera Wilson, 2003
- Pheidole rima Longino, 2019
- Pheidole rinae Emery, 1900
- Pheidole risii Forel, 1892
- Pheidole riveti Santschi, 1911
- Pheidole roberti Forel, 1902
- Pheidole rochai Forel, 1912
- Pheidole rogeri Emery, 1896
- Pheidole rogeripolita Longino, 2019
- Pheidole rogersi Forel, 1902
- Pheidole rohani Santschi, 1925
- Pheidole rojasae Vázquez-Franco, 2024
- Pheidole roosevelti Mann, 1921
- Pheidole rosae Forel, 1901
- Pheidole rosula Wilson, 2003
- Pheidole rotundiceps Wilson, 2003
- Pheidole roushae Wilson, 2003
- Pheidole rubiceps Wilson, 2003
- Pheidole rudigenis Emery, 1906
- Pheidole ruficeps (Smith, 1861)
- Pheidole rufipilis Forel, 1908
- Pheidole rugaticeps Emery, 1877
- Pheidole rugatula Santschi, 1933
- Pheidole rugiceps Wilson, 2003
- Pheidole rugifera Eguchi, 2001
- Pheidole rugithorax Eguchi, 2008
- Pheidole rugocephala Salata & Fisher, 2020
- Pheidole rugofitarata Salata & Fisher, 2020
- Pheidole rugosa Smith, 1858
- Pheidole rugosula Forel, 1902
- Pheidole rugulosa Gregg, 1959
- Pheidole rutilana Wilson, 2003
- Pheidole ryukyuensis Ogata, 1982

=== S ===
- Pheidole sabahna Eguchi, 2000
- Pheidole sabella Wilson, 2003
- Pheidole sabina Wilson, 2003
- Pheidole sagax Wilson, 2003
- Pheidole sagei Forel, 1902
- Pheidole sagittaria Wilson, 2003
- Pheidole sarae (Sharaf, 2018)
- Pheidole sarawakana Forel, 1911
- Pheidole sarcina Forel, 1912
- Pheidole sarpedon Wilson, 2003
- Pheidole sauberi Forel, 1905
- Pheidole sava Salata & Fisher, 2020
- Pheidole savegre Longino, 2019
- Pheidole saxicola Wheeler, 1922
- Pheidole sayapensis Eguchi, 2001
- Pheidole scabrata Forel, 1895
- Pheidole scabriuscula Gerstäcker, 1871
- Pheidole scapulata Santschi, 1923
- Pheidole schmalzi Emery, 1894
- Pheidole schoedli Eguchi et al., 2006
- Pheidole schoutedeni Forel, 1913
- Pheidole schultzei Forel, 1910
- Pheidole schwarzmaieri Borgmeier, 1939
- Pheidole sciara Cole, 1955
- Pheidole scimitara Wilson, 2003
- Pheidole sciophila Wheeler, 1908
- Pheidole scolioceps Wilson, 2003
- Pheidole scrobifera Emery, 1896
- Pheidole sculptior Forel, 1893
- Pheidole sculpturata Mayr, 1866
- Pheidole sebofila Longino, 2009
- Pheidole securigera Wilson, 2003
- Pheidole seeldrayersi Forel, 1910
- Pheidole selathorax Zhou, 2001
- Pheidole seligmanni Wilson, 2003
- Pheidole semidea Fischer et al., 2012
- Pheidole senex Gregg, 1952
- Pheidole senilis Santschi, 1929
- Pheidole sensipelada Longino, 2019
- Pheidole sensitiva Borgmeier, 1959
- Pheidole sepulchralis Bingham, 1903
- Pheidole sepultura Longino, 2019
- Pheidole sericella Viehmeyer, 1914
- Pheidole servilia Wilson, 2003
- Pheidole setosa Fischer, Hita Garcia & Peters, 2012
- Pheidole setsukoae Wilson, 2003
- Pheidole severini Forel, 1904
- Pheidole sexdentata Donisthorpe, 1948
- Pheidole sexspinosa Mayr, 1870
- Pheidole sharpi Forel, 1902
- Pheidole sicaria Wilson, 2003
- Pheidole sigillata Wilson, 2003
- Pheidole sikorae Forel, 1891
- Pheidole similigena Wheeler, 1937
- Pheidole similis Salata & Fisher, 2020
- Pheidole simoni Emery, 1893
- Pheidole simonsi Wilson, 2003
- Pheidole simplex Wheeler, 1925
- Pheidole simplispinosa Sarnat, 2008
- Pheidole sinaitica Mayr, 1862
- Pheidole singaporensis Özdikmen, 2010
- Pheidole singularis Smith, 1863
- Pheidole sinica (Wu & Wang, 1992)
- Pheidole sitiens Wilson, 2003
- Pheidole skwarrae Wheeler, 1934
- Pheidole smythiesii Forel, 1902
- Pheidole socrates Forel, 1912
- Pheidole soesilae Makhan, 2007
- Pheidole sofia Salata & Fisher, 2020
- Pheidole soritis Wheeler, 1908
- Pheidole sospes Forel, 1908
- Pheidole spadonia Wheeler, 1915
- Pheidole sparsa Salata & Fisher, 2020
- Pheidole sparsisculpta Longino, 2009
- Pheidole spathicornis Wilson, 2003
- Pheidole spathifera Forel, 1902
- Pheidole spathipilosa Wilson, 2003
- Pheidole specularis Wilson, 2003
- Pheidole speculifera Emery, 1877
- Pheidole sperata Forel, 1915
- Pheidole sphaerica Wilson, 2003
- Pheidole spilota Wilson, 2003
- Pheidole spinicornis Eguchi, 2001
- Pheidole spininodis Mayr, 1887
- Pheidole spinoda (Smith, 1858)
- Pheidole spinosa Forel, 1891
- Pheidole spinulosa Forel, 1910
- Pheidole squalida Santschi, 1910
- Pheidole steinheili Forel, 1901
- Pheidole stigma Wilson, 2003
- Pheidole stomachosa Wheeler, 1917
- Pheidole strator Forel, 1910
- Pheidole striata Donisthorpe, 1947
- Pheidole striaticeps Donisthorpe, 1947
- Pheidole strigosa Wilson, 2003
- Pheidole strobeli Emery, 1906
- Pheidole stulta Forel, 1886
- Pheidole styrax Wilson, 2003
- Pheidole subaberrans (Kusnezov, 1952)
- Pheidole subarmata Mayr, 1884
- Pheidole submonticola Eguchi, 2001
- Pheidole subnuda Wilson, 2003
- Pheidole subreticulata Emery, 1894
- Pheidole subsphaerica Wilson, 2003
- Pheidole sulcaticeps Roger, 1863
- Pheidole superba Wilson, 2003
- Pheidole susannae Forel, 1886
- Pheidole susanowo Onoyama & Terayama, 1999
- Pheidole sykesii Forel, 1902
- Pheidole synanthropica Longino, 2009
- Pheidole synarmata Wilson, 2003

=== T ===
- Pheidole tachigaliae Wheeler, 1921
- Pheidole tachirana Wilson, 2003
- Pheidole taipoana Wheeler, 1928
- Pheidole taivanensis Forel, 1912
- Pheidole tambopatae Wilson, 2003
- Pheidole tampony Salata & Fisher, 2020
- Pheidole tandjongensis Forel, 1913
- Pheidole tanyscapa Wilson, 2003
- Pheidole tapanti Longino, 2019
- Pheidole tarchon Wilson, 2003
- Pheidole tasmaniensis Mayr, 1866
- Pheidole taurus Emery, 1906
- Pheidole tawauensis Eguchi, 2001
- Pheidole templaria Forel, 1902
- Pheidole tenebricosa Eguchi, 2001
- Pheidole tenebrovulgaris Salata & Fisher, 2020
- Pheidole tenerescens Wheeler, 1922
- Pheidole tennantae Wilson, 2003
- Pheidole tenuicephala Longino, 2009
- Pheidole tenuiclavata Donisthorpe, 1943
- Pheidole tenuinodis Mayr, 1901
- Pheidole tenuis Wilson, 2003
- Pheidole tepicana Pergande, 1896
- Pheidole tepuicola Wilson, 2003
- Pheidole termitobia Forel, 1901
- Pheidole termitophila Forel, 1904
- Pheidole terraceensis Bharti, 2001
- Pheidole terresi Wheeler & Mann, 1914
- Pheidole terribilis Wilson, 2003
- Pheidole tetra Creighton, 1950
- Pheidole tetracantha Emery, 1897
- Pheidole tetrica Forel, 1913
- Pheidole tetroides Wilson, 2003
- Pheidole texana Wheeler, 1903
- Pheidole tigris Wilson, 2003
- Pheidole tijucana Borgmeier, 1927
- Pheidole tikal Longino, 2019
- Pheidole tillandsiarum Wheeler, 1934
- Pheidole tinamu Longino, 2019
- Pheidole tisiphone Wheeler, 1911
- Pheidole titanis Wheeler, 1903
- Pheidole tjibodana Forel, 1905
- Pheidole tobini Wilson, 2003
- Pheidole tolteca Forel, 1901
- Pheidole torosa Wilson, 2003
- Pheidole trachyderma Emery, 1906
- Pheidole trageri Wilson, 2003
- Pheidole tragica Wheeler, 1934
- Pheidole traini Wilson, 2003
- Pheidole transfigens Forel, 1911
- Pheidole transversostriata Mayr, 1887
- Pheidole trapezoidea Viehmeyer, 1914
- Pheidole tricarinata Santschi, 1914
- Pheidole trichotos Salata & Fisher, 2020
- Pheidole tricolor Donisthorpe, 1949
- Pheidole triconstricta Forel, 1886
- Pheidole trinitatis Wilson, 2003
- Pheidole triplex Wilson, 2003
- Pheidole tristis (Smith, 1858)
- Pheidole tristops Wilson, 2003
- Pheidole truncula Wilson, 2003
- Pheidole tsaravoniana Salata & Fisher, 2020
- Pheidole tschinkeli Wilson, 2003
- Pheidole tsontekonwei Longino, 2019
- Pheidole tuculutan Longino, 2019
- Pheidole tumida Eguchi, 2008
- Pheidole turneri Forel, 1902
- Pheidole tuxtlasana Wilson, 2003
- Pheidole typhlos Salata & Fisher, 2020
- Pheidole tysoni Forel, 1901

=== U ===
- Pheidole ulothrix Wilson, 2003
- Pheidole ululevu Fischer et al., 2016
- Pheidole umbonata Mayr, 1870
- Pheidole umphreyi Wilson, 2003
- Pheidole uncagena Sarnat, 2008
- Pheidole unicornis Wilson, 2003
- Pheidole upeneci Forel, 1913
- Pheidole uranus Salata & Fisher, 2020
- Pheidole urbana Camargo-Vanegas & Guerrero, 2020
- Pheidole ursus Mayr, 1870

=== V ===
- Pheidole vadum Salata & Fisher, 2020
- Pheidole vafella Wheeler, 1925
- Pheidole vafra Santschi, 1923
- Pheidole valens Wilson, 2003
- Pheidole vallicola Wheeler, 1915
- Pheidole vallifica Forel, 1901
- Pheidole vanderveldi Forel, 1913
- Pheidole variabilis Mayr, 1876
- Pheidole variolosa Emery, 1892
- Pheidole vatovavensis Salata & Fisher, 2020
- Pheidole vatu Mann, 1921
- Pheidole veletis Wilson, 2003
- Pheidole velox Emery, 1887
- Pheidole venatrix Wilson, 2003
- Pheidole verricula Wilson, 2003
- Pheidole vestita Wilson, 2003
- Pheidole veteratrix Forel, 1891
- Pheidole victima Santschi, 1929
- Pheidole victoris Forel, 1913
- Pheidole vieti Eguchi, 2008
- Pheidole vigilans (Smith, 1858)
- Pheidole violacea Wilson, 2003
- Pheidole virago Wheeler, 1915
- Pheidole viriosa Wilson, 2003
- Pheidole viserion Sarnat et al., 2016
- Pheidole vistana Forel, 1914
- Pheidole voasara Salata & Fisher, 2020
- Pheidole vohemarensis Salata & Fisher, 2020
- Pheidole volontany Salata & Fisher, 2020
- Pheidole vomer Wilson, 2003
- Pheidole vony Salata & Fisher, 2020
- Pheidole vorax (Fabricius, 1804)
- Pheidole voreios Salata & Fisher, 2020
- Pheidole vulcan Fischer & Fisher, 2013
- Pheidole vulgaris Eguchi, 2006

=== W ===
- Pheidole walkeri Mann, 1922
- Pheidole wallacei Mann, 1916
- Pheidole wardi Wilson, 2003
- Pheidole watsoni Forel, 1902
- Pheidole weiseri Forel, 1910
- Pheidole wheelerorum MacKay, 1988
- Pheidole wiesei Wheeler, 1919
- Pheidole williamsi Wheeler, 1919
- Pheidole wilsoni Mann, 1921
- Pheidole wolfringi Forel, 1908
- Pheidole woodmasoni Forel, 1885
- Pheidole wroughtonii Forel, 1902

=== X ===
- Pheidole xanthocnemis Emery, 1914
- Pheidole xanthogaster Wilson, 2003
- Pheidole xerophila Wheeler, 1908
- Pheidole xiloa Longino, 2019
- Pheidole xocensis Forel, 1913
- Pheidole xyston Wilson, 2003

=== Y ===
- Pheidole yaqui Creighton & Gregg, 1955
- Pheidole yeensis Forel, 1902
- Pheidole yucatana Wilson, 2003

=== Z ===
- Pheidole zannia Longino, 2019
- Pheidole zavamanira Salata & Fisher, 2020
- Pheidole zelata Wilson, 2003
- Pheidole zeteki Smith, 1947
- Pheidole zhoushanensis Li & Chen, 1992
- Pheidole zirafy Salata & Fisher, 2020
- Pheidole zoceana Santschi, 1925
- Pheidole zoster Wilson, 2003

== Extinct species ==
- †Pheidole anticua Casadei-Ferreira et al., 2019
- †Pheidole chaan Varela-Hernández & Flores-Zapoteco, 2024
- †Pheidole cordata Holl, 1829
- †Pheidole pauchil Varela-Hernández & Riquelme, 2021
- †Pheidole praehistorica Varela-Hernández & Riquelme, 2024
- †Pheidole primigenia Baroni Urbani, 1995
- †Pheidole rasnitsyni Dubovikoff, 2011
- †Pheidole tertiaria Carpenter, 1930
- †Pheidole tethepa Wilson, 1985

== Unidentifiable species ==
A number of species in the genus have been noted to be unidentifiable to species level as their descriptions were lost or too vague and the type specimens lost, although they theoretically remain valid binomen. They are listed below.

- Pheidole bahai (Forel, 1922)
- Pheidole buckleyi Smith, 1951
- Pheidole cingulata (Smith, 1857)
- Pheidole delecta Forel, 1899
- Pheidole gigliolii Menozzi, 1935
- Pheidole inflexa Santschi, 1923
- Pheidole picea (Buckley, 1866)
- Pheidole semilaevis Forel, 1901

== See also ==
- Data related to Pheidole at Wikispecies
