= Sciara =

Sciara may refer to:

- Sciara (fly), a genus of fungus gnats
- Sciara sheep, a breed of sheep from Calabria, Italy
- Sciara, Sicily, a town on Sicily
- Sciara del Fuoco, a lava flow on Stromboli, Italy
- Pheidole sciara, a species of ant

== See also ==
- Sciarra, surname
