= Sciophila =

Sciophila is the scientific name of several genera of organisms and may refer to:

- Sciophila (fly), a genus of insects in the family Mycetophilidae
- Sciophila Gaudich., a genus of plants in the family Urticaceae, now considered a synonym of Procris
- Sciophila Wibel, a genus of plants in the family Asparagaceae, now considered a synonym of Maianthemum
- Pheidole sciophila, a species of ant
