= Sciarra =

Sciarra is an Italian surname. Notable people with the surname include:

- Girolamo Colonna di Sciarra (1708–1763), Italian Roman Catholic Cardinal of the noble Colonna di Sciarra family
- Prospero Colonna di Sciarra (1707–1765), Italian Roman Catholic cardinal of the family of the dukes of Carbognano
- Daniele Sciarra (born 1991), Italian footballer
- Emiliano Sciarra (born 1971), Italian game designer
- John Sciarra (born 1954), American football player
- John Sciarra, Jr., American football player
- Laurent Sciarra (born 1973), French basketball player
- Mark Sciarra (born 1954), American retired professional wrestler, known as Rip Rogers
- Maurizio Sciarra (born 1955), Italian film director
- Paul Sciarra, American Internet entrepreneur
- Silvana Sciarra (born 1948), Italian judge

In fiction

- Lucia Sciarra, fictional character of the 2015 British spy film Spectre

== See also ==
- Sciarra Colonna (1270–1329), Italian member of the powerful Colonna family
- Villa Sciarra (Rome), property of the Italian noble family Colonna di Sciarra from 1811 until 1880s
