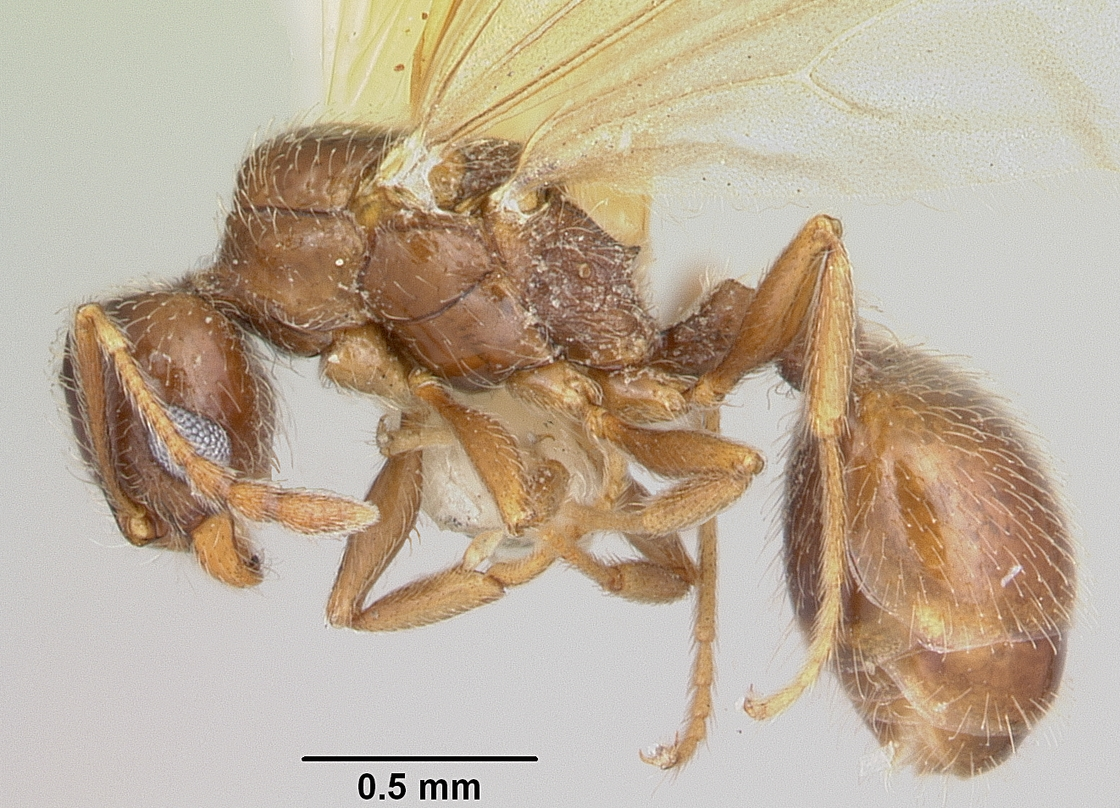
- Pheidole elecebra queen

Conservation status
- Vulnerable (IUCN 2.3)

Scientific classification
- Kingdom: Animalia
- Phylum: Arthropoda
- Class: Insecta
- Order: Hymenoptera
- Family: Formicidae
- Subfamily: Myrmicinae
- Genus: Pheidole
- Species: P. elecebra

Binomial name
- Pheidole elecebra (Wheeler, 1904)

= Pheidole elecebra =

Species of ant

Pheidole elecebra is a species of ant in the genus Pheidole. It is endemic to the United States. Pheidole elecebra is a workerless inquiline within the nests of Pheidole ceres.
