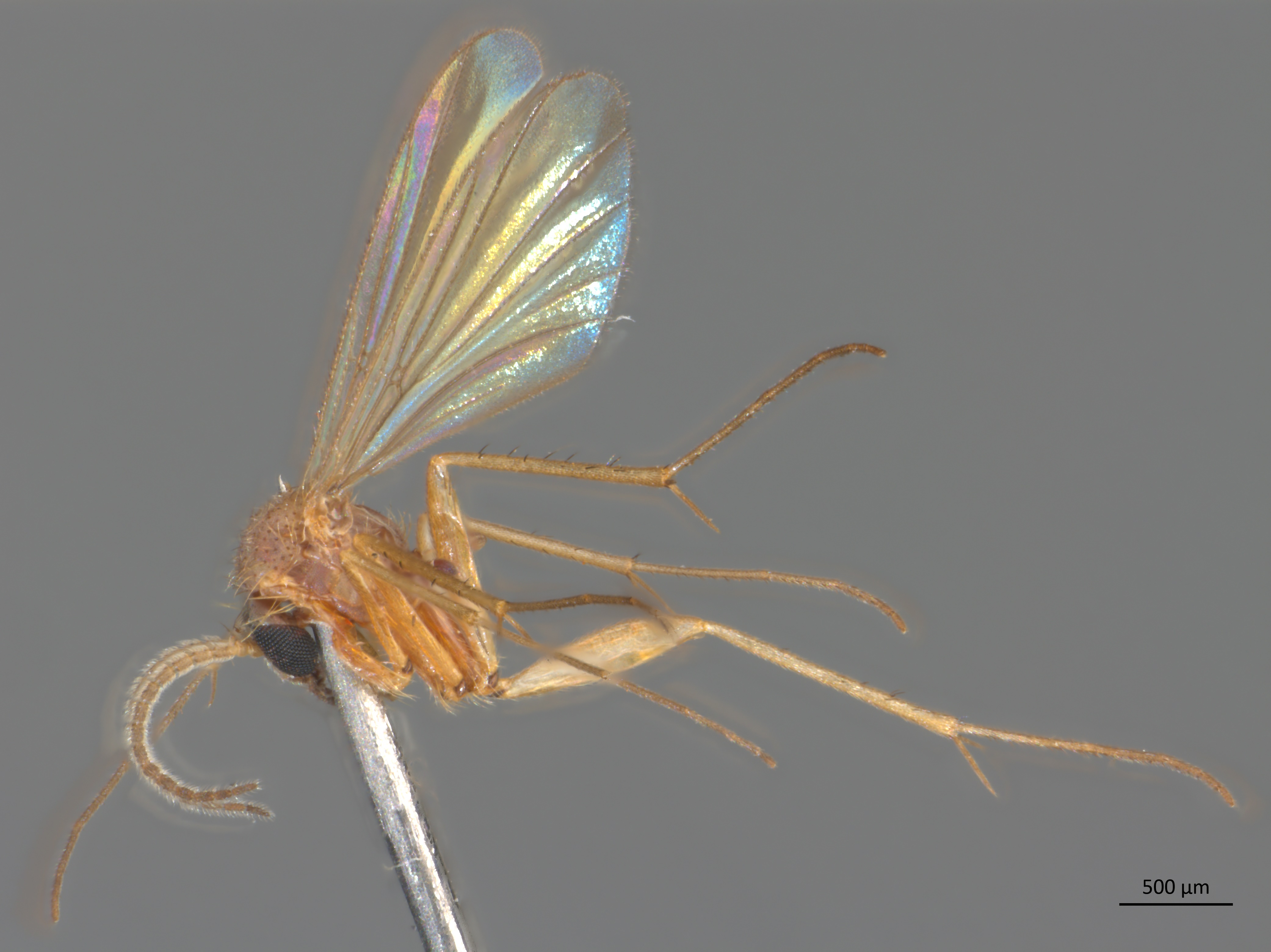

Scientific classification
- Domain: Eukaryota
- Kingdom: Animalia
- Phylum: Arthropoda
- Class: Insecta
- Order: Diptera
- Family: Mycetophilidae
- Genus: Sciophila
- Species: S. fractinervis

Binomial name
- Sciophila fractinervis Edwards, 1940

= Sciophila fractinervis =

Species of insect

Sciophila fractinervis is a species of fungus gnat in the family Mycetophilidae.

== Distribution ==
Sciophila fractinervis is a tropical species and was originally described in 1940 by Frederick Wallace Edwards using specimens collected by Friedrich 'Fritz' Plaumann from the neighbourhood of Nova Teutonia, Santa Catarina, Brazil. S. fractinervis has been found on cultivated greenhouse plants in the United Kingdom and was recorded by Peter J. Chandler in 2010 on examples of commercially-grown Eustoma grandiflorum from Warwickshire. This species was also recorded on greenhouse examples of Platycerium and Beaucarnea in the Netherlands in 2005. S. fractinervis is considered by RINSE (Registry of non-native species in the Two Seas region countries) as a non-native species in Great Britain, France, Belgium and the Netherlands.

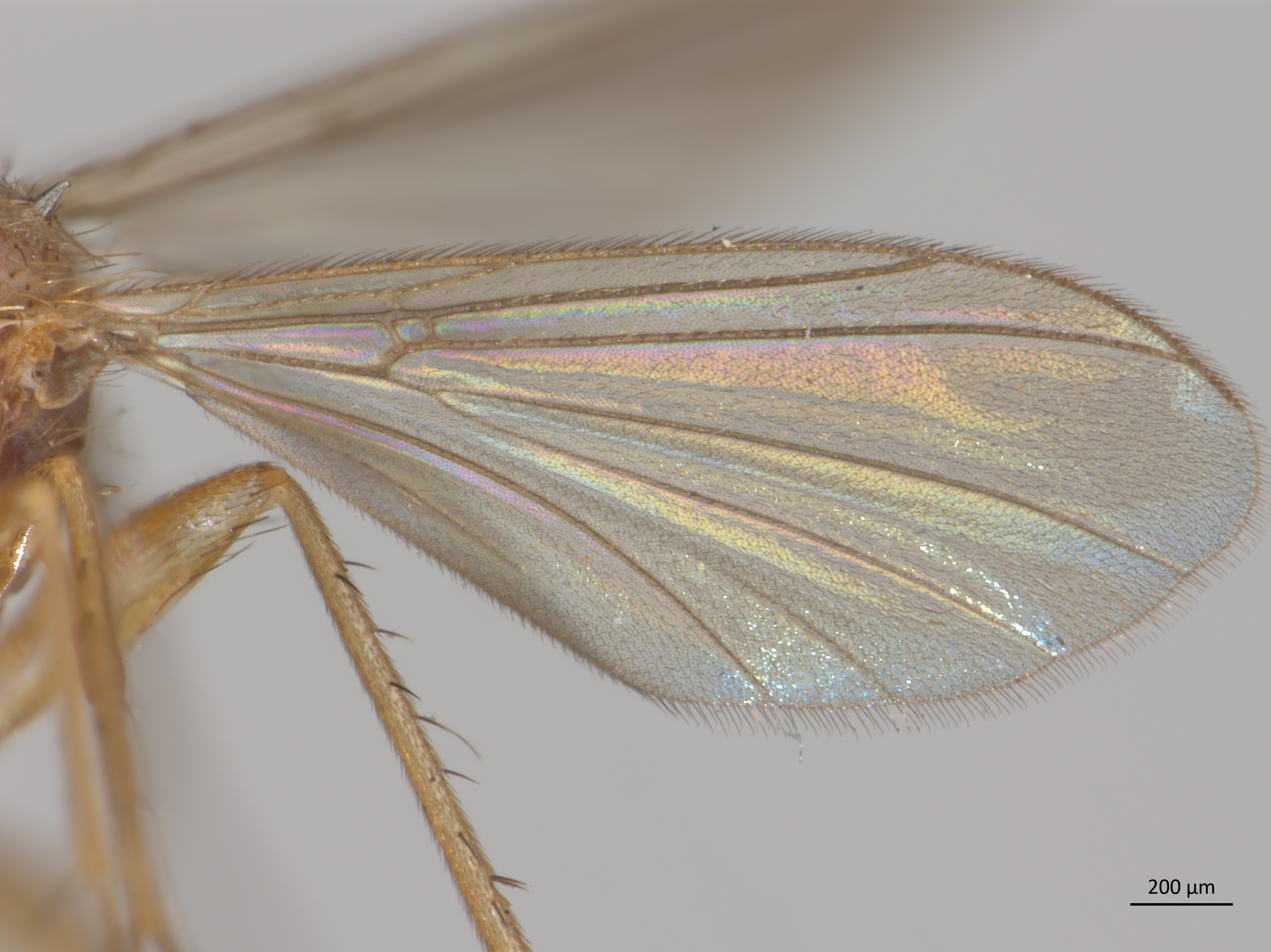
Wing of the fungus gnat Sciophila fractinervis (male lectotype specimen, NHMUK010626504 BMNH258029).

== Description ==
The larvae of Sciophila fractinervis are brown in colour and have a glossy appearance, due to being enclosed in a mucus tube created from labial glands around the mouth.

The adults have a dark grey head with a yellowish face, a yellowish thorax, brown abdomen and yellow legs. The mouthparts are black. The wings of the male measure 2.5 - 2.7mm and the wings of the female are 2.9 - 3.2mm. Females of the species have shorter antennae than males.

Edwards observed that the macrotrichia (hairs or bristles) on the wings of S. fractinervis are less dense, and therefore more conspicuous than on the comparable species Sciophila ciliata.

== Life cycle ==
Sciophila fractinervis larvae build silky cocoons of webbing either on the basal leaves of their host plant or on the soil underneath. The larvae eat fungus spores which grow upon the webbing to sustain themselves, mainly from saprophytic species of fungus that feed on decaying plant matter. The webbing built by the larvae likely also provides a protective environment against predators as larvae have been observed retreating when the webbing is suddenly vibrated. The leaves of the host plant do not appear to be damaged by the larval activity, at least in cultivated plant examples but the webbing is considered unsightly by commercial plant growers. The larvae take about 7-10 days to pupate and emerge as adults.
