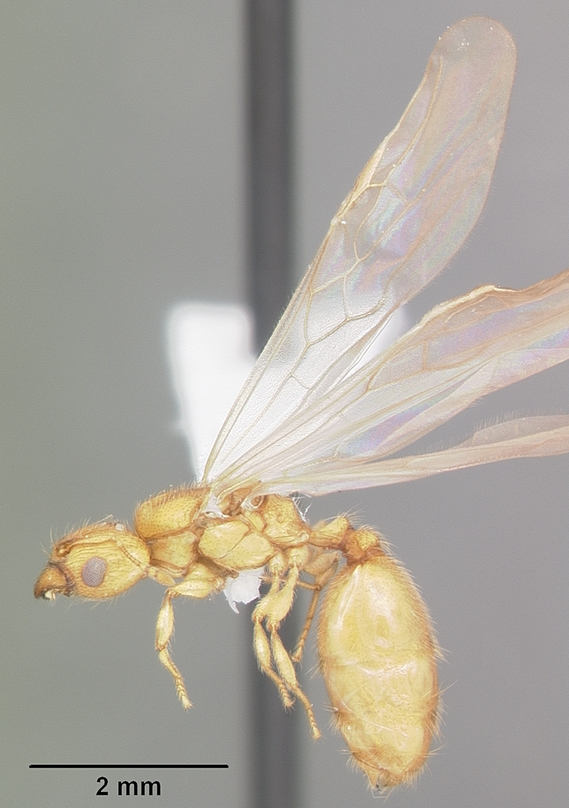

Scientific classification
- Kingdom: Animalia
- Phylum: Arthropoda
- Class: Insecta
- Order: Hymenoptera
- Family: Formicidae
- Subfamily: Myrmicinae
- Genus: Pheidole
- Species: P. tysoni

Binomial name
- Pheidole tysoni Forel, 1901

= Pheidole tysoni =

Species of ant

Pheidole tysoni is a species of ant and a higher myrmicine in the family Formicidae.
