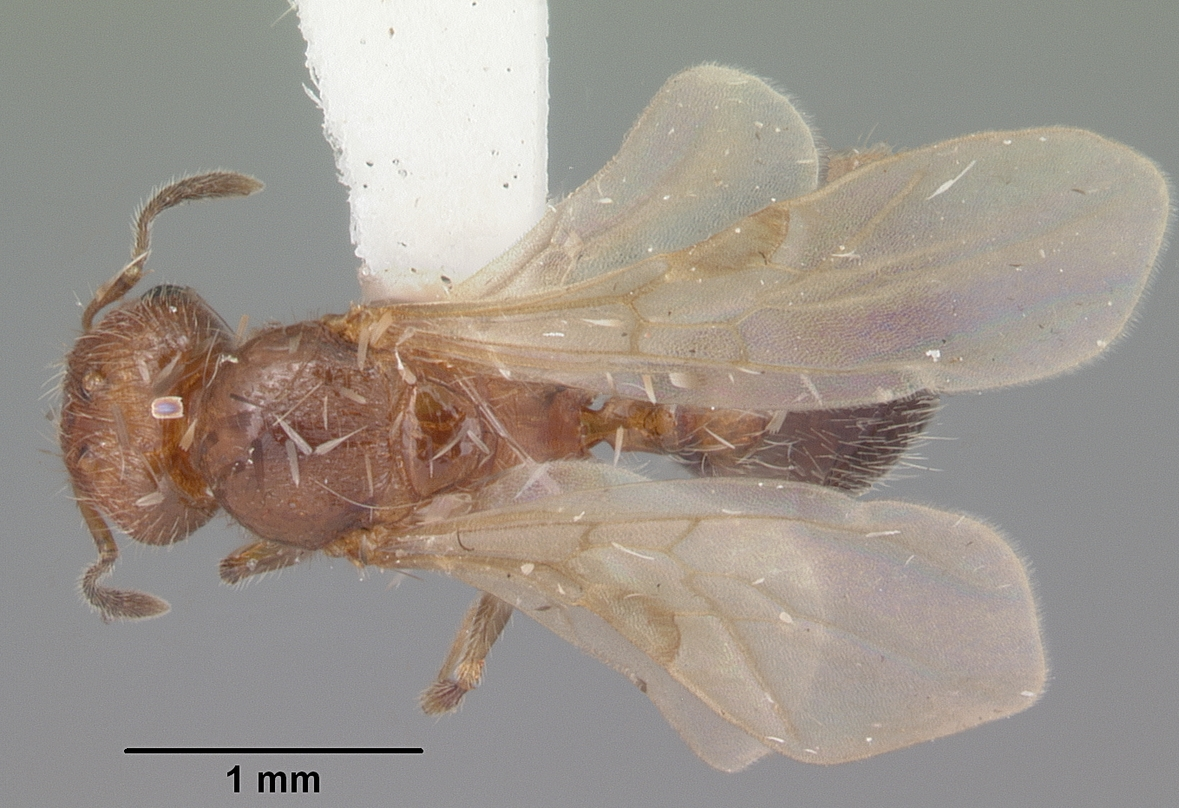

Scientific classification
- Kingdom: Animalia
- Phylum: Arthropoda
- Clade: Pancrustacea
- Class: Insecta
- Order: Hymenoptera
- Family: Formicidae
- Subfamily: Myrmicinae
- Genus: Pheidole
- Species: P. metallescens

Binomial name
- Pheidole metallescens Emery, 1895

= Pheidole metallescens =

Species of ant

Pheidole metallescens is an ant, a species of higher myrmicine in the family Formicidae.

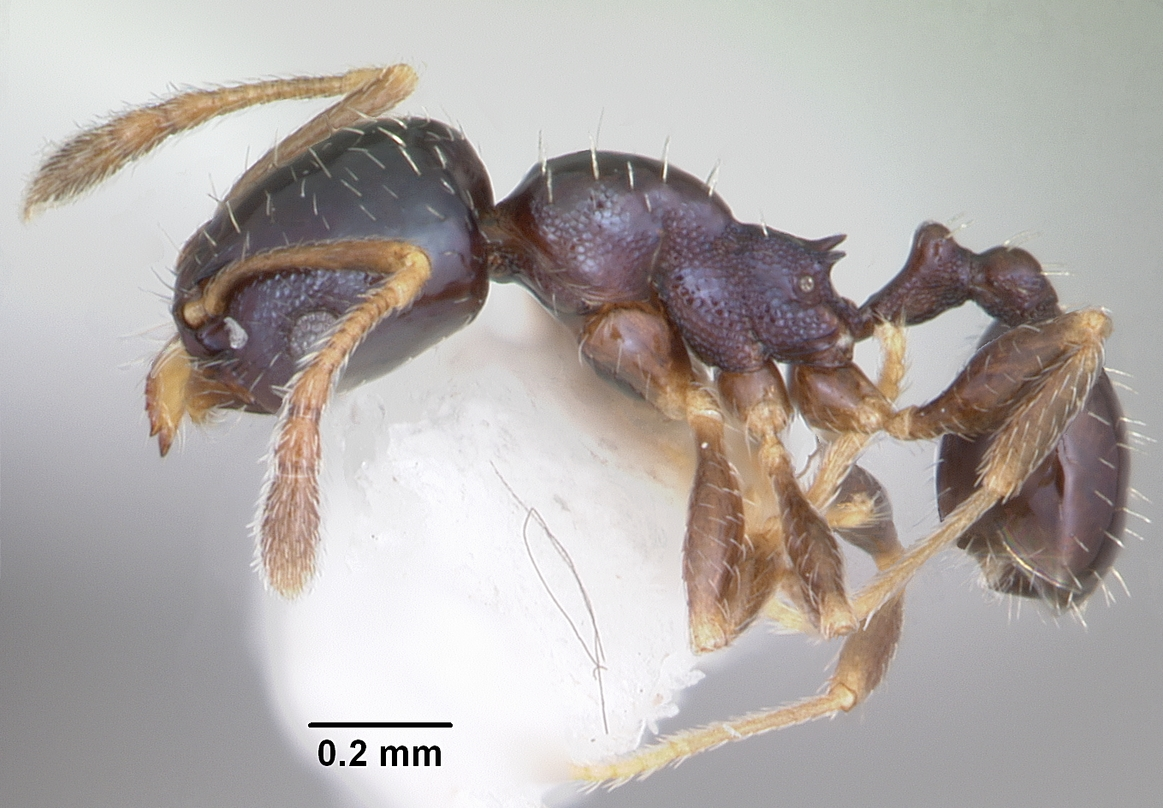

== Subspecies ==
- Pheidole metallescens metallescens Emery, 1895
- Pheidole metallescens splendidula Wheeler, 1908
