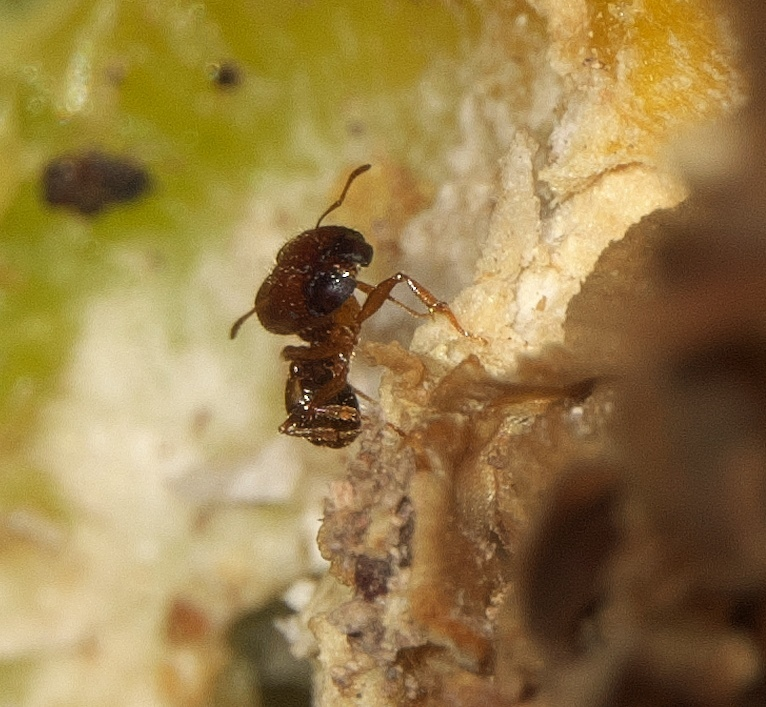
- Pheidole tepicana, Arizona

Scientific classification
- Kingdom: Animalia
- Phylum: Arthropoda
- Class: Insecta
- Order: Hymenoptera
- Family: Formicidae
- Subfamily: Myrmicinae
- Genus: Pheidole
- Species: P. tepicana

Binomial name
- Pheidole tepicana Pergande, 1896

= Pheidole tepicana =

Species of ants

Pheidole tepicana is a species of higher myrmicine in the family Formicidae, found in the southwestern United States and Mexico.
