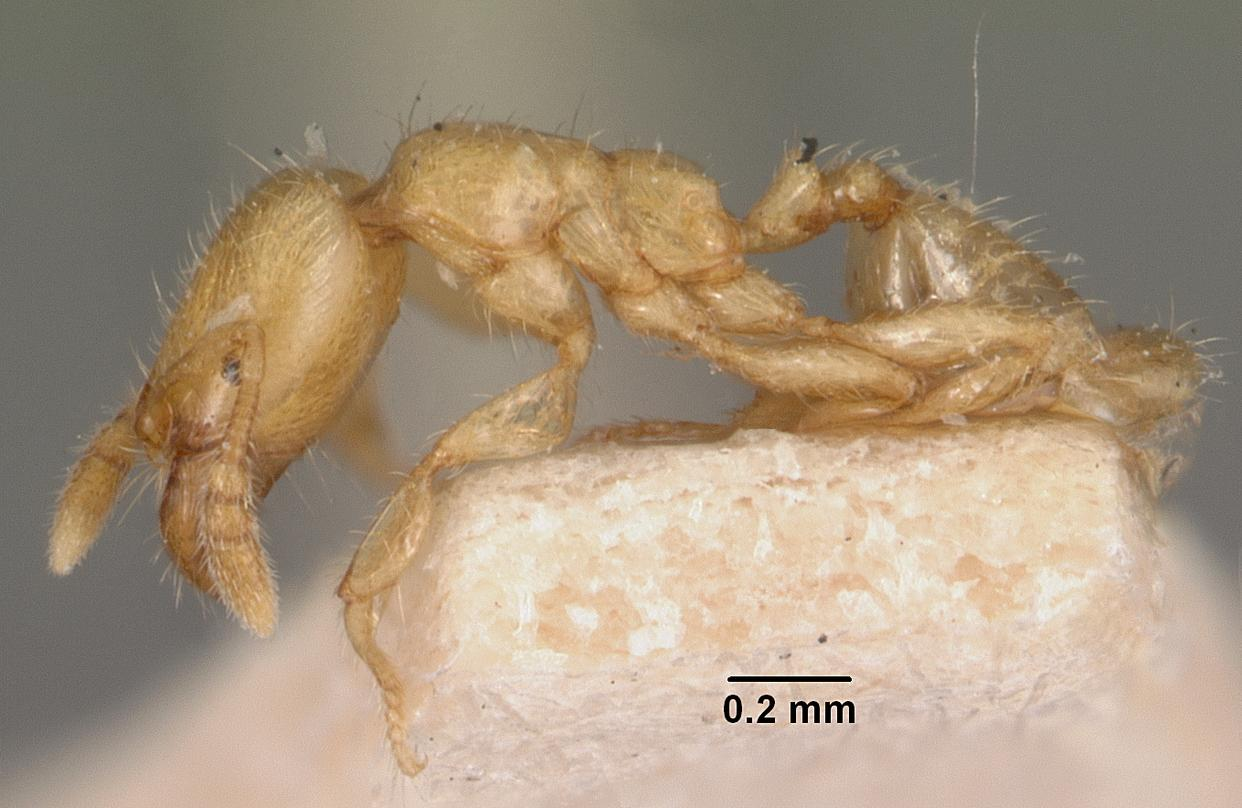

Scientific classification
- Kingdom: Animalia
- Phylum: Arthropoda
- Class: Insecta
- Order: Hymenoptera
- Family: Formicidae
- Subfamily: Myrmicinae
- Tribe: Attini
- Genus: Pheidole
- Species: P. dispar

Binomial name
- Pheidole dispar (Forel, 1895)

= Pheidole dispar =

Genus of ants

Pheidole dispar is a species of rarely-encountered big-headed ant endemic to Australia. Their colonies nest in soil or between rocks in habitats ranging from savanna to rainforest. Little is known about their biology, however they are primarily subterranean in nature. Prior to 2015, Pheidole dispar was the sole species of a monotypic genus Machomyrma, however molecular phylogeny places the species within Pheidole.
