= Pheidole kasparii =

Scientific classification
- Kingdom: Animalia
- Phylum: Arthropoda
- Class: Insecta
- Order: Hymenoptera
- Family: Formicidae
- Subfamily: Myrmicinae
- Genus: Pheidole
- Species: P. kasparii

Binomial name
- Pheidole kasparii Longino, 2019

Species of ant

Pheidole kasparii is a species of ant in the genus Pheidole. It is endemic to Costa Rica.
