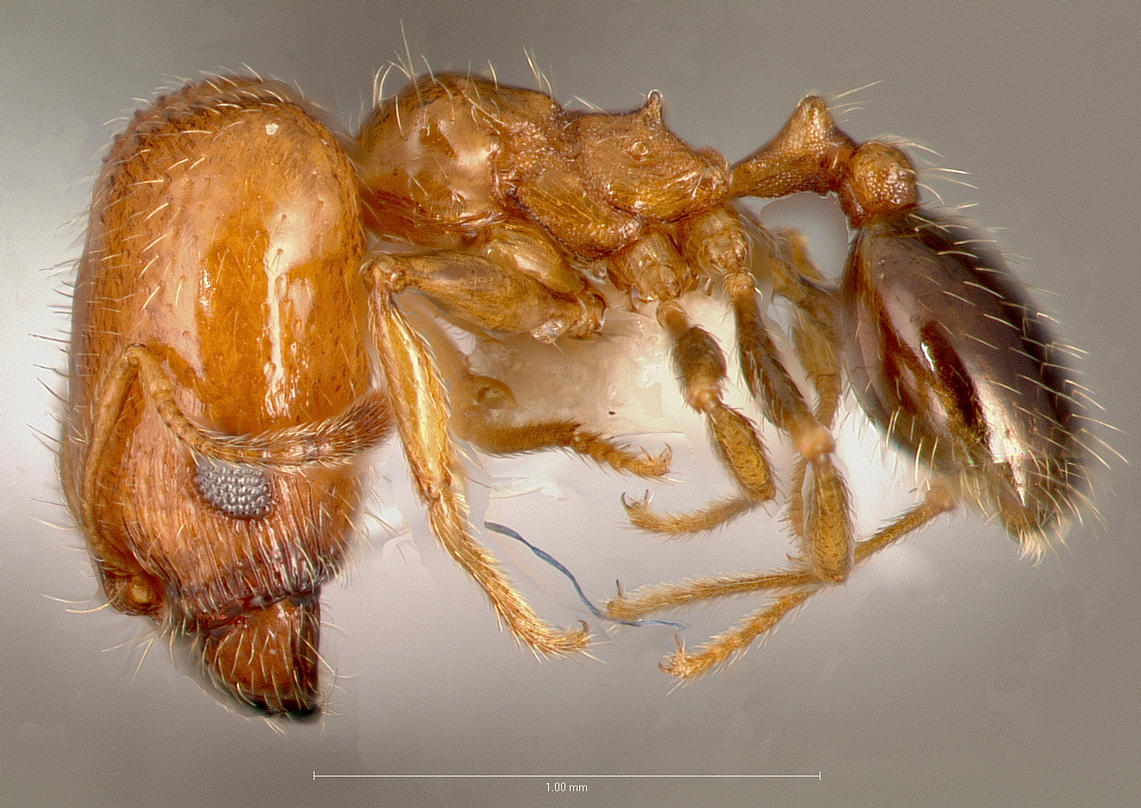

Scientific classification
- Kingdom: Animalia
- Phylum: Arthropoda
- Class: Insecta
- Order: Hymenoptera
- Family: Formicidae
- Subfamily: Myrmicinae
- Tribe: Attini
- Genus: Pheidole
- Species: P. californica

Binomial name
- Pheidole californica Mayr, 1870

= Pheidole californica =

Species of ant

Pheidole californica is an ant, a species of higher myrmicine in the family Formicidae.

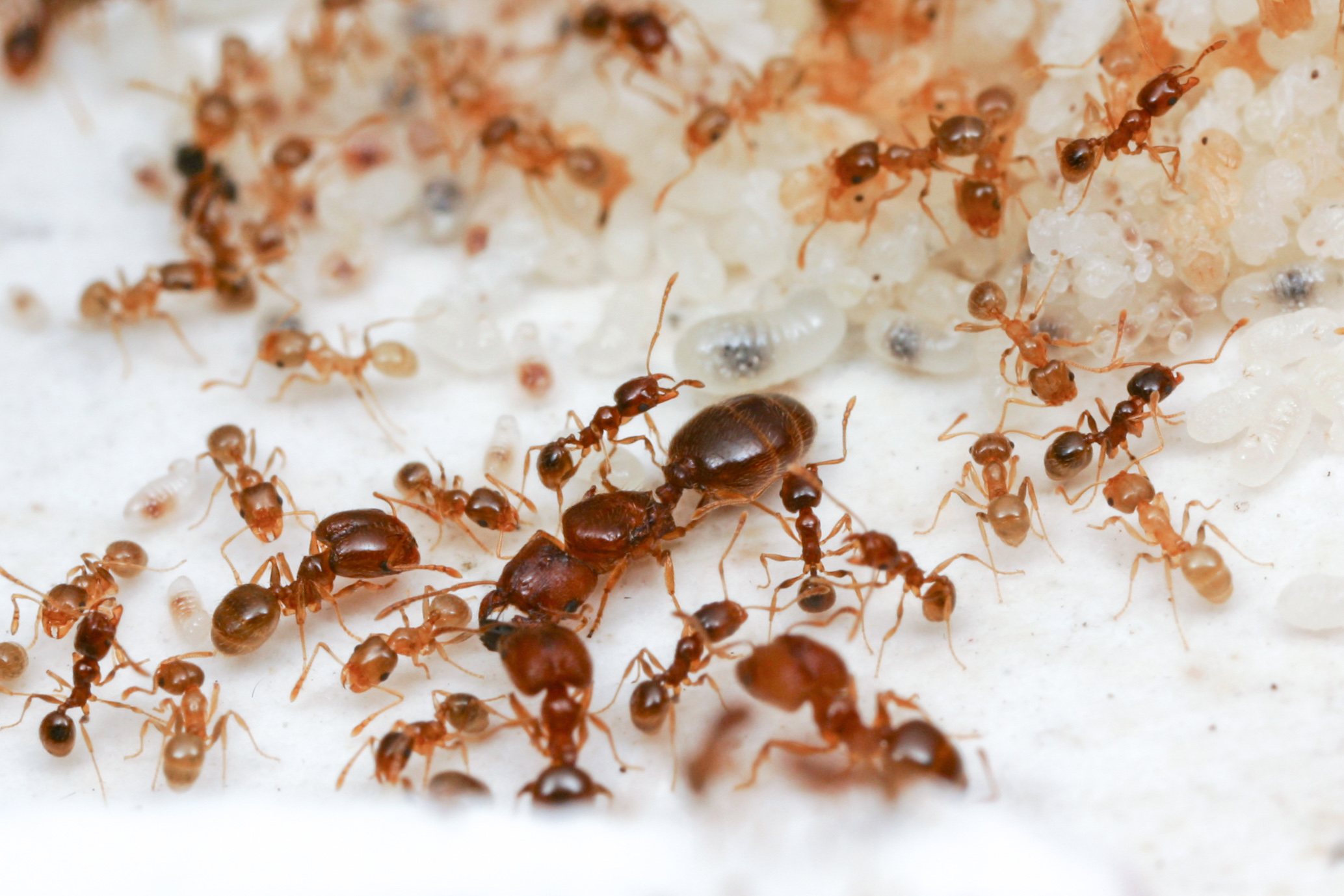

== Subspecies ==
These two subspecies belong to the species Pheidole californica:

- Pheidole californica californica Mayr, 1870^{i c g}
- Pheidole californica oregonica Emery, 1895^{i c g}

Data sources: i = ITIS, c = Catalogue of Life, g = GBIF, b = Bugguide.net
