= John Sciarra Jr. =

American football player

John Sciarra Jr. is a former American football quarterback who played at the University of California, Los Angeles and Wagner College. He was born in California and was a 2001 graduate of Saint Francis High School in La Cañada Flintridge, California.

== UCLA ==
Sciarra was the third-string quarterback behind Drew Olson and Matt Moore. He comes from a long line of Bruins. His mother, father (UCLA All-American quarterback John Sr.), sister, cousin, four aunts and grandfather all went to UCLA. Sciarra appeared in five games as a quarterback in 2002, going 5-of-12 for 75 yards and one touchdown on the year. He played in the fourth quarter at Cal when Cory Paus and Olson were injured and left the game, and he also threw a 14-yard touchdown pass to Marcedes Lewis against USC, which was the first of his career.

In 2003, new UCLA coach Karl Dorrell promoted Sciarra to second string due to injuries. Prior to the second game of the season, the school learned that Sciarra had been arrested the prior month at a Newport Beach convenience store for public intoxication and disorderly conduct; he also gave a false name to a police officer. Dorrell suspended him for a game, and he did not play the rest of the season.

== Wagner ==
At the end of the 2003 season, Sciarra transferred to Wagner College. While playing for the Wagner Seahawks, Sciarra broke multiple school records. As a senior in 2005, Sciarra became the first ever Northeast Conference player to throw for over 3,000 yards in a season. He was also named an Academic All Star by the Division I-AA Athletic Directors Association. Sciarra, as a sociology major, earned a 3.49 GPA. He was honored as Wagner's most valuable player.

After his football career John landed a role as an associate with Lazard Asset Management. John has excelled at the firm and in 2011 was promoted to vice president. John has enjoyed working and living in NY and has now taken up basketball to continue his athletic achievements. He plays regularly in a 5:30 am game in New York City where his shooting ability has not quite caught up with his ability to give a hard foul. He is well known for battling fellow Lazard colleagues on the court and playing an intimidating style of defense.

== Sources ==
- January 10, 2006 NEC press release
