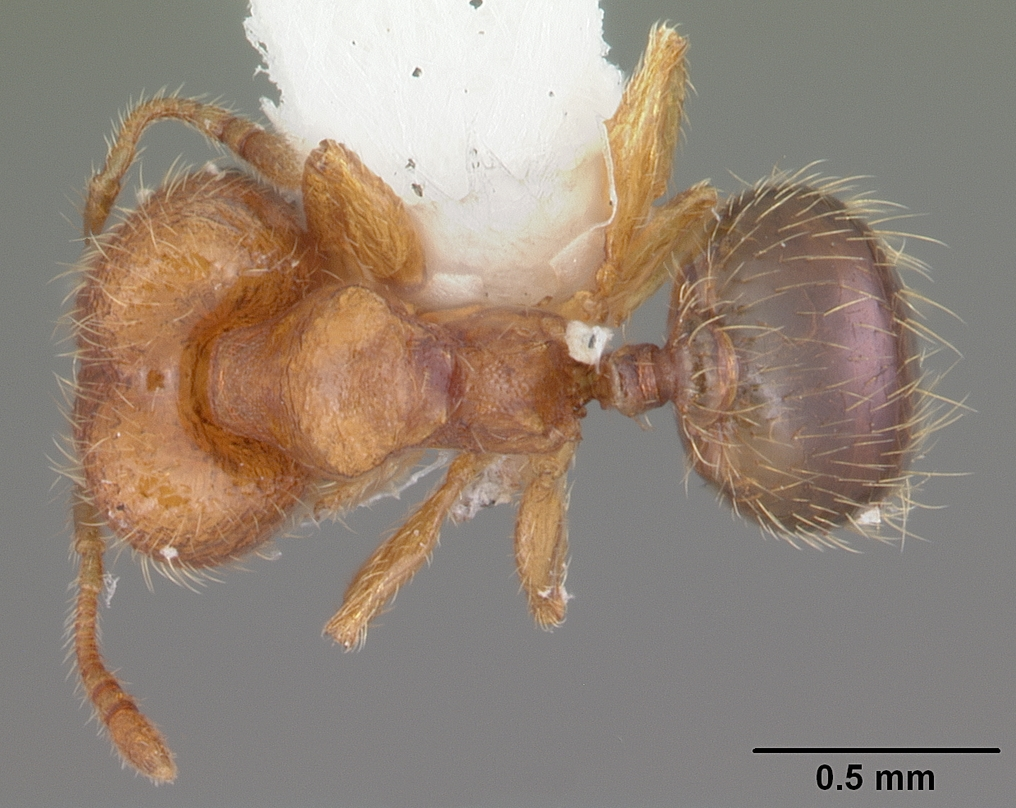

Scientific classification
- Kingdom: Animalia
- Phylum: Arthropoda
- Class: Insecta
- Order: Hymenoptera
- Family: Formicidae
- Subfamily: Myrmicinae
- Tribe: Attini
- Genus: Pheidole
- Species: P. dentigula

Binomial name
- Pheidole dentigula Smith, 1927

= Pheidole dentigula =

Species of ant

Pheidole dentigula is an ant, a species of higher myrmicine in the family Formicidae.
