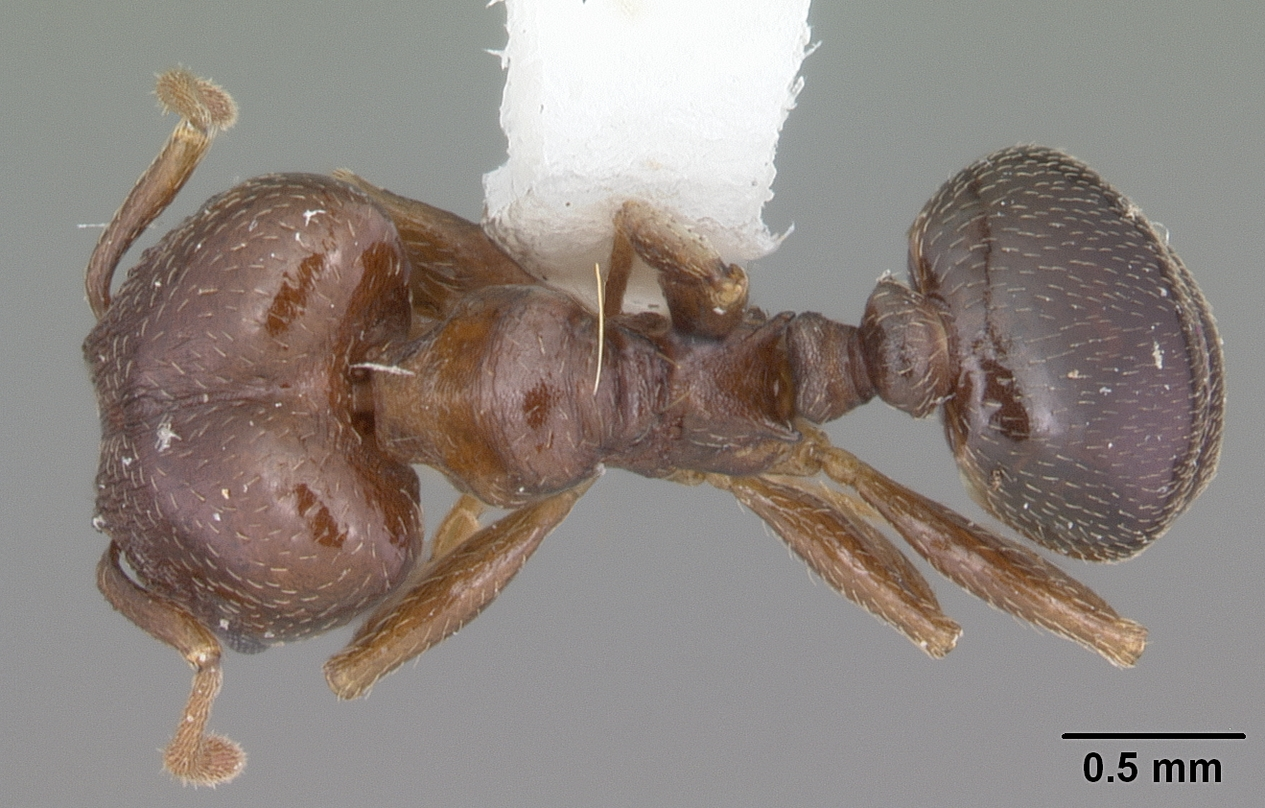

Scientific classification
- Kingdom: Animalia
- Phylum: Arthropoda
- Class: Insecta
- Order: Hymenoptera
- Family: Formicidae
- Subfamily: Myrmicinae
- Genus: Pheidole
- Species: P. crassicornis

Binomial name
- Pheidole crassicornis Emery, 1895

= Pheidole crassicornis =

Species of ant

Pheidole crassicornis is an ant, a species of higher myrmicine in the family Formicidae.

== Subspecies ==
These two subspecies belong to the species Pheidole crassicornis:

- Pheidole crassicornis crassicornis Emery, 1895^{i c g}
- Pheidole crassicornis tetra Creighton, 1950^{i c g}

Data sources: i = ITIS, c = Catalogue of Life, g = GBIF, b = Bugguide.net
