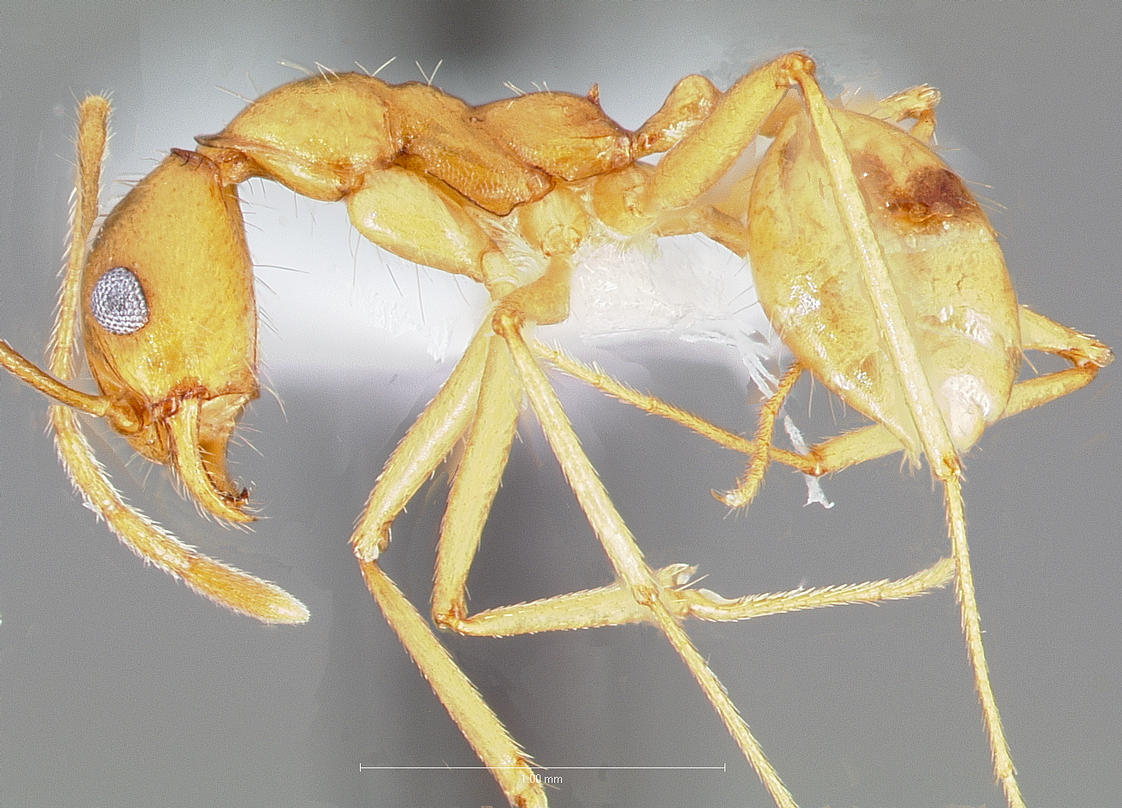

Scientific classification
- Kingdom: Animalia
- Phylum: Arthropoda
- Class: Insecta
- Order: Hymenoptera
- Family: Formicidae
- Subfamily: Myrmicinae
- Tribe: Attini
- Genus: Pheidole
- Species: P. vistana

Binomial name
- Pheidole vistana Forel, 1914

= Pheidole vistana =

Species of ant

Pheidole vistana is a species of big-headed ant native to Nevada, Arizona, California, Baja California, Baja California Sur, and Sonora. Its diet apparently consists of only insects, and many workers will cooperate to efficiently transport prey into the nest. It is a primarily nocturnal species that may rarely forage on overcast days. Large rings of sand often surround its nest entrances. The species is named after its type locality of Vista, California in San Diego County.

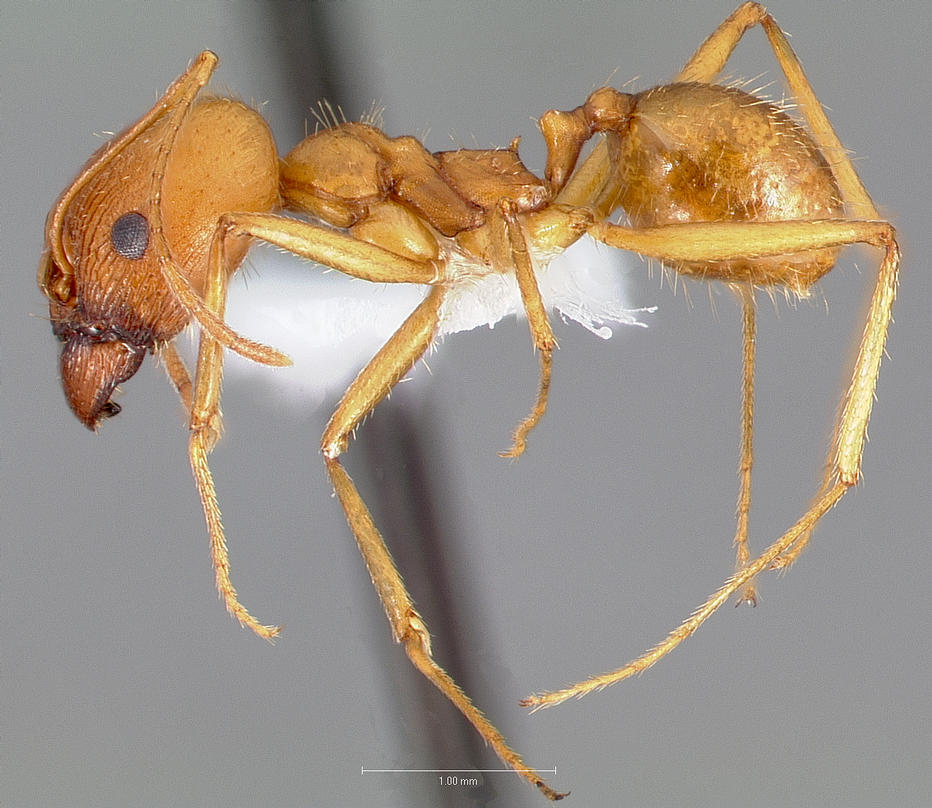
P. vistana major worker AntWeb specimen

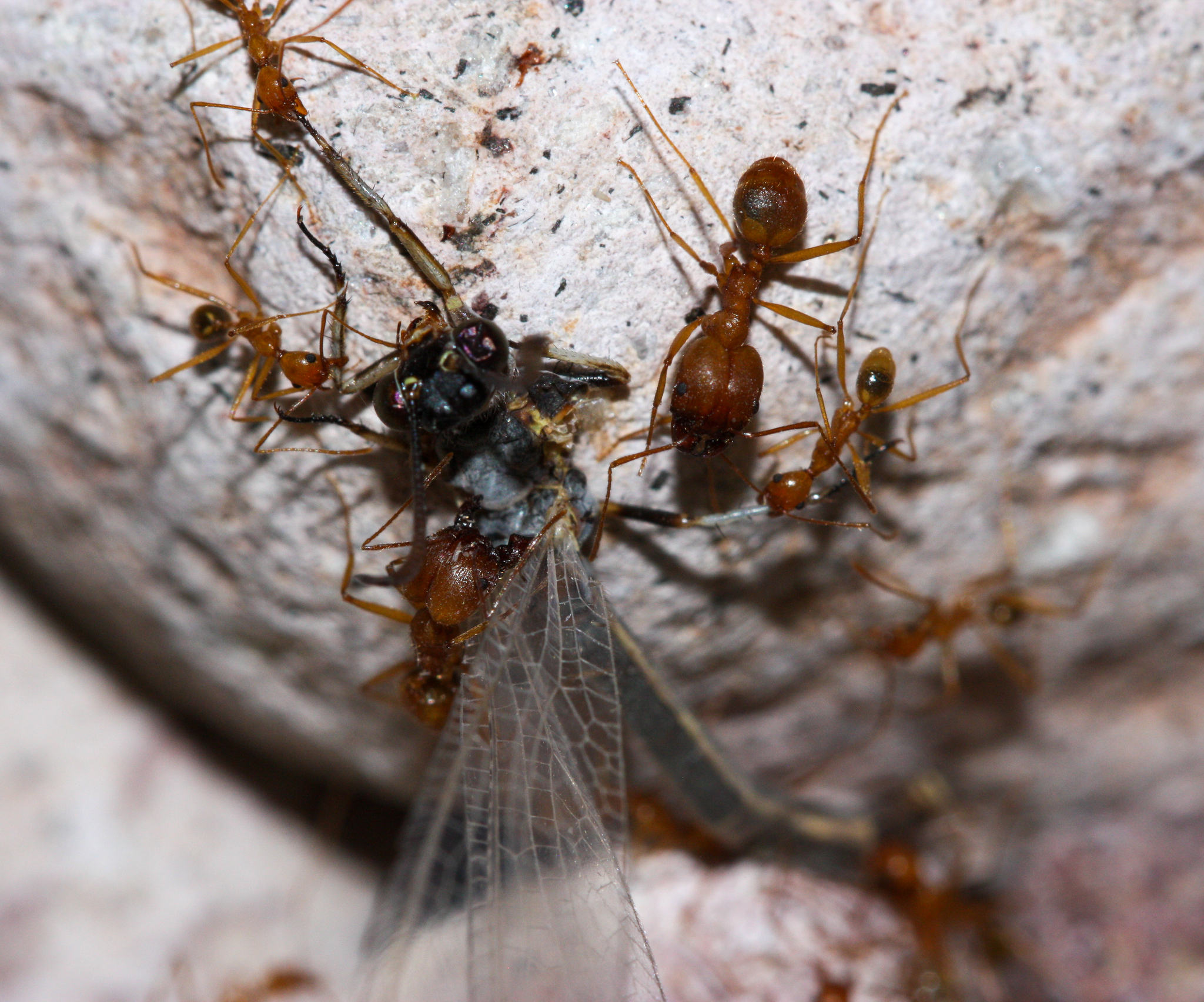
Major and minor workers collaborating to transport prey.
