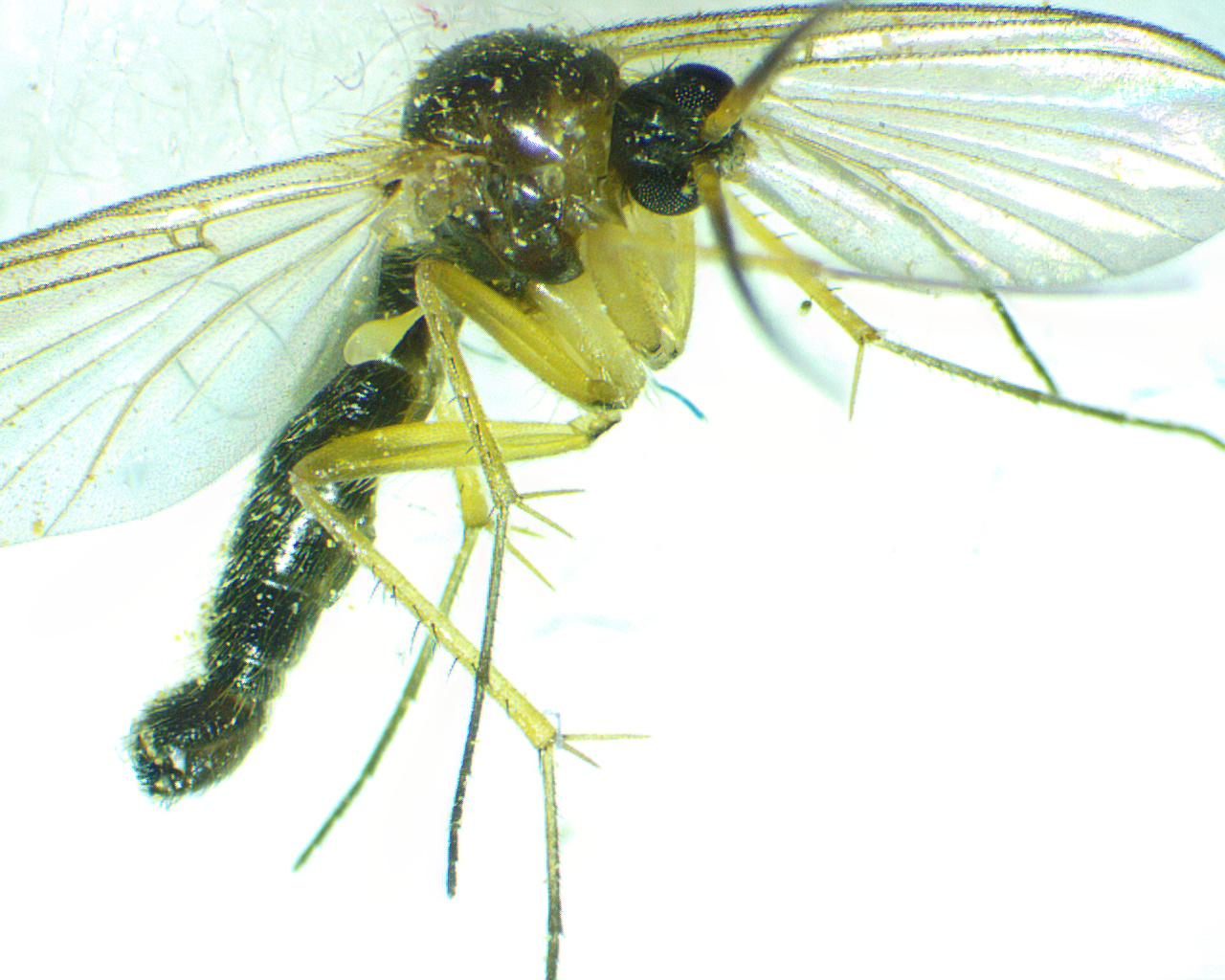
- Sciophila plurisetosa

Scientific classification
- Kingdom: Animalia
- Phylum: Arthropoda
- Clade: Pancrustacea
- Class: Insecta
- Order: Diptera
- Family: Mycetophilidae
- Subfamily: Sciophilinae
- Genus: Sciophila; Meigen, 1818

= Sciophila (fly) =

Genus of flies

Sciophila is a genus of fungus gnats in the family Mycetophilidae. There are at least 50 described species in the genus Sciophila.

== Species ==
- Sciophila acuta Garrett, 1925
- Sciophila adamsi Edwards, 1925
- Sciophila agassis Garrett, 1925
- Sciophila arizonensis Zaitzev, 1982
- Sciophila arnaudi Zaitzev, 1982
- Sciophila bicuspidata Zaitzev, 1982
- Sciophila bifida Garrett, 1925
- Sciophila californiensis Zaitzev, 1982
- Sciophila canadensis Zaitzev, 1982
- Sciophila cliftoni Edwards, 1925
- Sciophila conformis Zaitzev, 1982
- Sciophila cordata Zaitzev, 1982
- Sciophila distincta Garrett, 1925
- Sciophila emarginata Zaitzev, 1982
- Sciophila exserta Zaitzev, 1982
- Sciophila fasciata Say, 1823
- Sciophila fenestella Curtis, 1837
- Sciophila festiva Zaitzev, 1982
- Sciophila fractinervis Edwards, 1940
- Sciophila fridolini Stackelberg, 1943
- Sciophila fuliginosa Holmgren, 1883
- Sciophila fusca Garrett, 1925
- Sciophila gagnei Zaitzev, 1982
- Sciophila garretti Zaitzev
- Sciophila habilis Johannsen, 1910
- Sciophila hebes Johannsen, 1910
- Sciophila hirta Meigen, 1818
- Sciophila impar Johannsen, 1910
- Sciophila incallida Johannsen, 1910
- Sciophila insignis Zaitzev, 1982
- Sciophila insueta Zaitzev, 1982
- Sciophila iowensis Zaitzev, 1982
- Sciophila karelica Zaitzev, 1982
- Sciophila laffooni Zaitzev, 1982
- Sciophila longua Garrett, 1925
- Sciophila minuta Zaitzev, 1982
- Sciophila mississippiensis Khalaf, 1971
- Sciophila modesta Zaitzev, 1982
- Sciophila montana Zaitzev, 1982
- Sciophila neohebes Garrett, 1925
- Sciophila nigronitida Landrock, 1912
- Sciophila nonnisilva Hutson, 1979
- Sciophila notabilis Zaitzev, 1982
- Sciophila novata Johannsen, 1910
- Sciophila ochracea Walker, 1982
- Sciophila pallipes Say, 1824
- Sciophila parahebes Zaitzev, 1982
- Sciophila parva Garrett, 1925
- Sciophila pluridentata Zaitzev, 1982
- Sciophila plurisetosa Edwards, 1982
- Sciophila quadratula (Loew, 1869)
- Sciophila septentrionalis Zaitzev, 1982
- Sciophila setosa Garrett, 1925
- Sciophila severa Johannsen, 1910
- Sciophila sublimbatella Zaitzev, 1982
- Sciophila vakulenkoi Stackelberg, 1943
- Sciophila vockerothi Zaitzev, 1982
