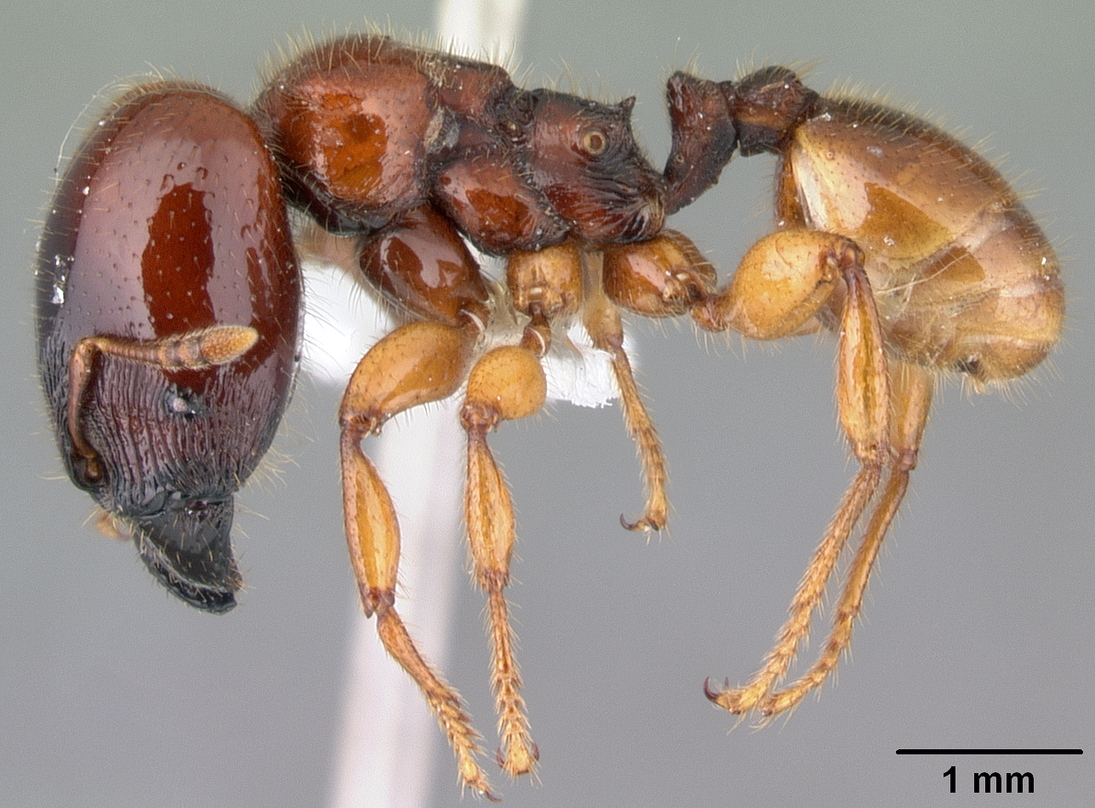
- Pheidole antipodum worker

Scientific classification
- Kingdom: Animalia
- Phylum: Arthropoda
- Class: Insecta
- Order: Hymenoptera
- Family: Formicidae
- Subfamily: Myrmicinae
- Genus: Pheidole
- Species: P. antipodum

Binomial name
- Pheidole antipodum (Smith, 1858)

= Pheidole antipodum =

Species of ant

Pheidole antipodum is a species of ant in the genus Pheidole. It is known only from Australia, where the ants nest in drier regions in soil or under rocks. Little is known about their biology, but they are thought to be specialist predators of termites.

It was formerly placed as the sole member of the genus Anisopheidole.
