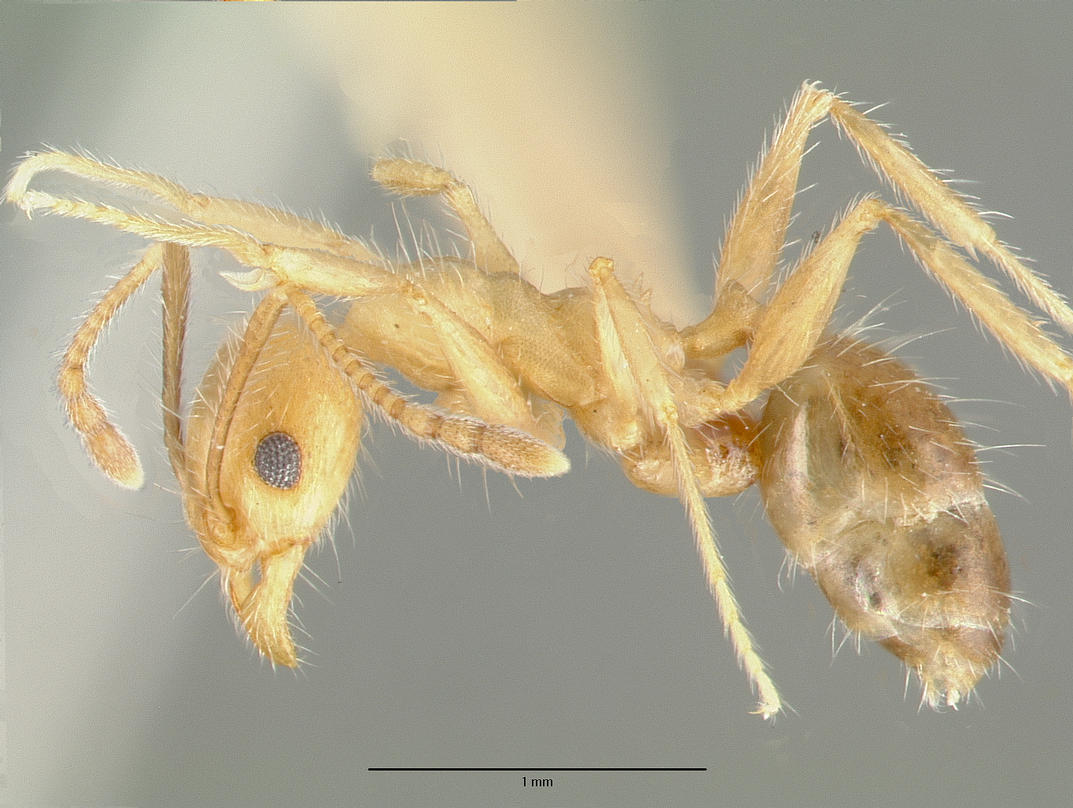

Scientific classification
- Kingdom: Animalia
- Phylum: Arthropoda
- Class: Insecta
- Order: Hymenoptera
- Family: Formicidae
- Subfamily: Myrmicinae
- Genus: Pheidole
- Species: P. hyatti

Binomial name
- Pheidole hyatti Emery, 1895

= Pheidole hyatti =

Species of ant

Pheidole hyatti is a species of big-headed ant native to the southwestern United States, Mexico, and Guatemala, invasive in Hawaii, and possibly present in Panama, Bolivia, and Argentina.

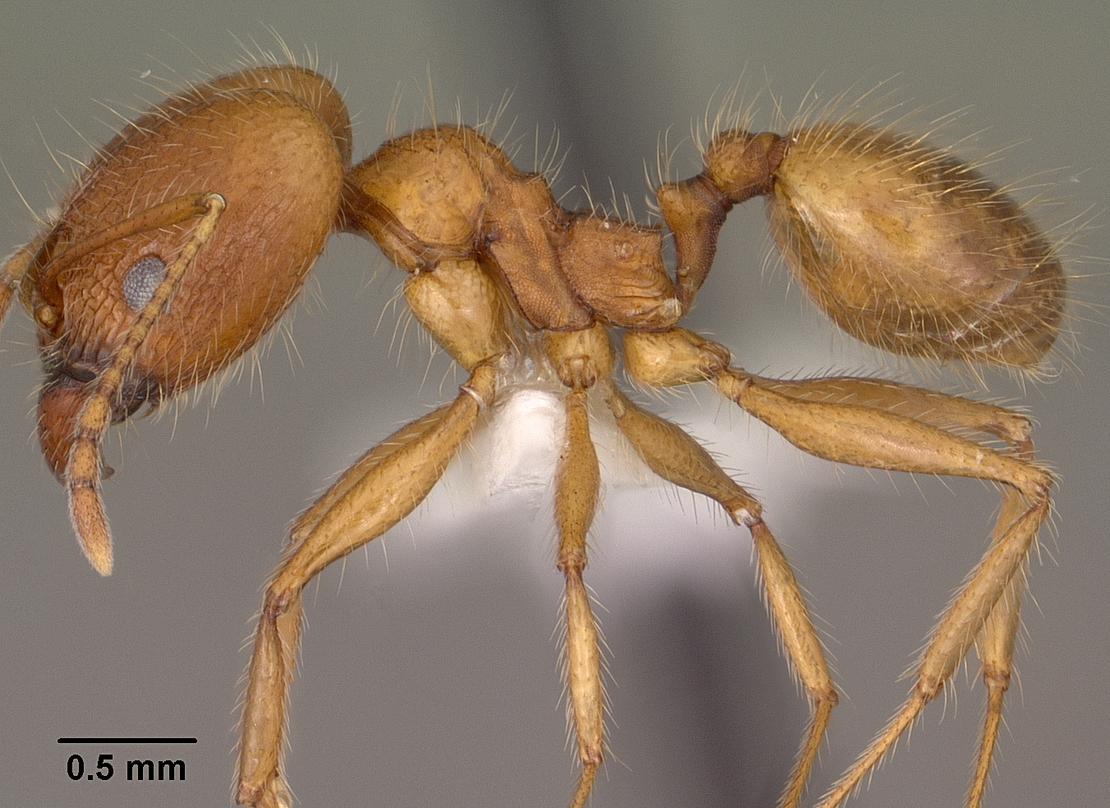
antweb.org major worker specimen

== Subspecies ==
As of 2024, Pheidole hyatti contains one accepted subspecies.

- Pheidole hyatti hyatti Emery, 1895
