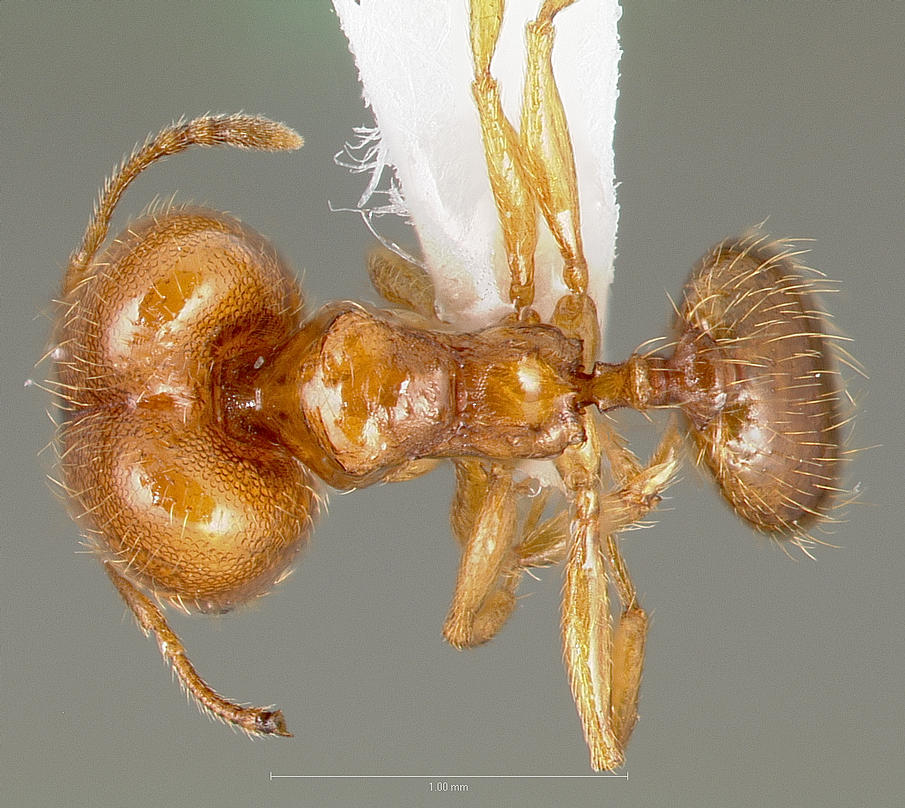

Scientific classification
- Kingdom: Animalia
- Phylum: Arthropoda
- Class: Insecta
- Order: Hymenoptera
- Family: Formicidae
- Subfamily: Myrmicinae
- Tribe: Attini
- Genus: Pheidole
- Species: P. cerebrosior

Binomial name
- Pheidole cerebrosior Wheeler, 1915

= Pheidole cerebrosior =

Species of ant

Pheidole cerebrosior is a species of higher myrmicine in the family Formicidae.

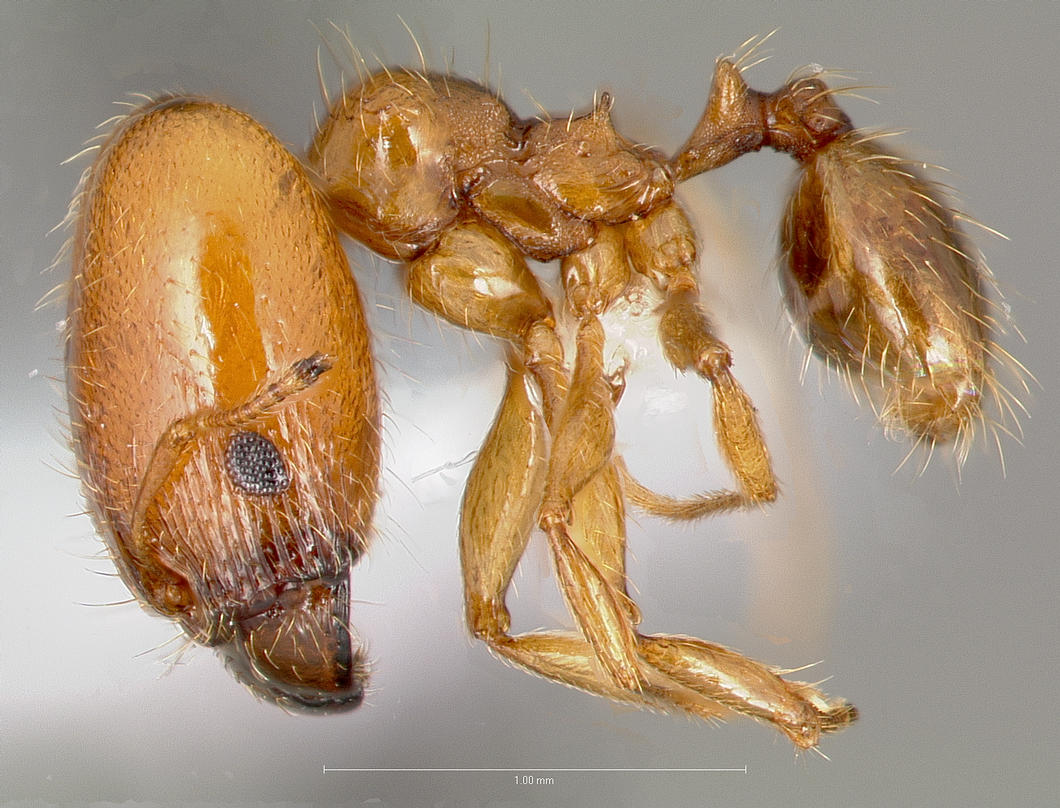
