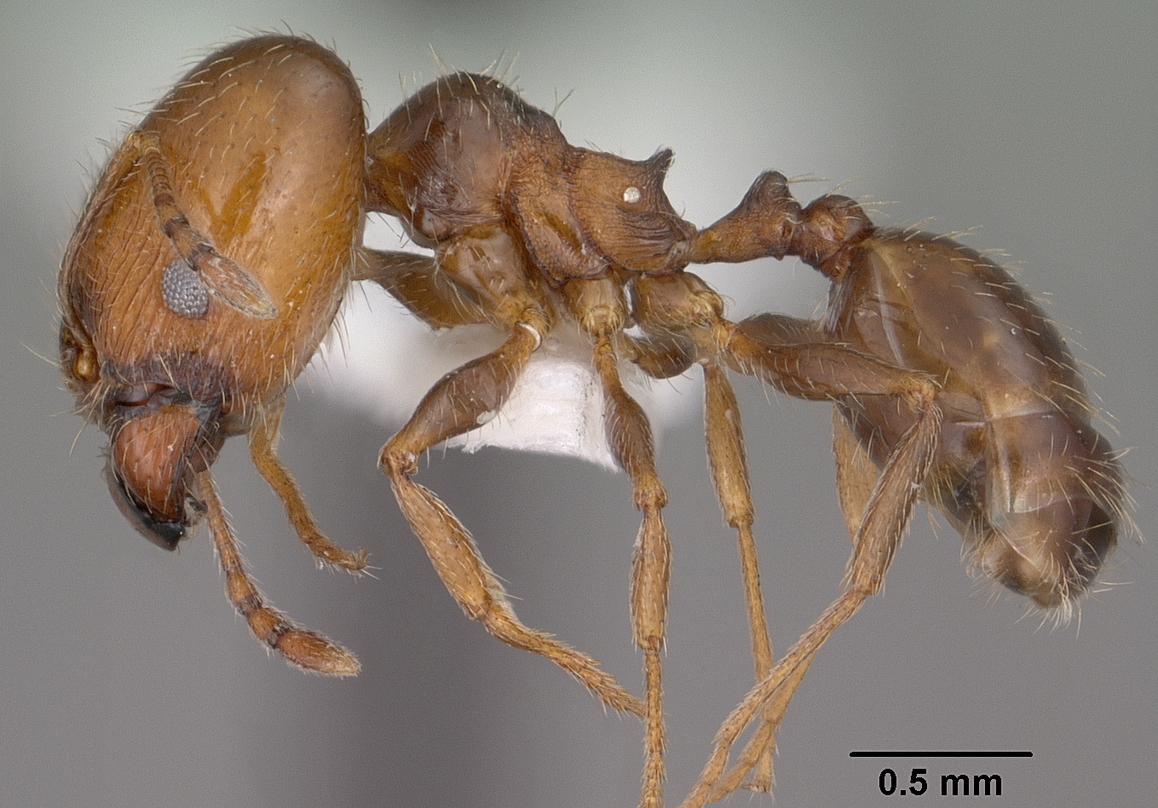

Scientific classification
- Kingdom: Animalia
- Phylum: Arthropoda
- Class: Insecta
- Order: Hymenoptera
- Family: Formicidae
- Subfamily: Myrmicinae
- Genus: Pheidole
- Species: P. ceres

Binomial name
- Pheidole ceres Wheeler, 1904

= Pheidole ceres =

Species of ant

Pheidole ceres is a species of big-headed ant native to the southwestern United States and Mexico.
