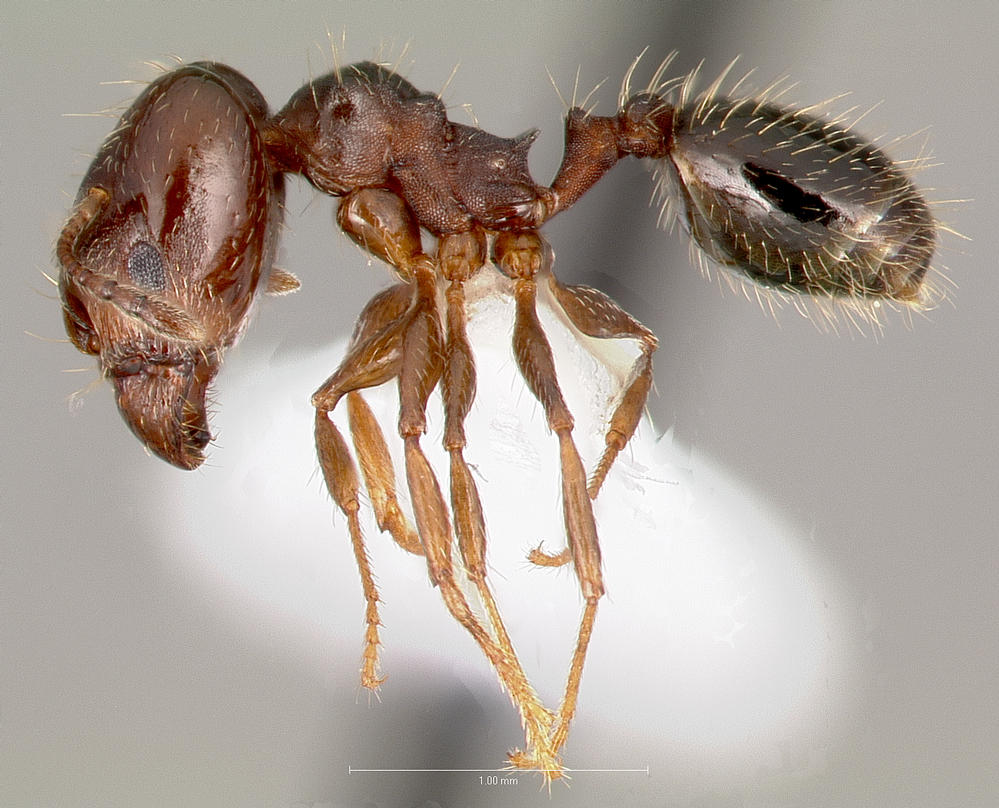

Scientific classification
- Kingdom: Animalia
- Phylum: Arthropoda
- Class: Insecta
- Order: Hymenoptera
- Family: Formicidae
- Subfamily: Myrmicinae
- Genus: Pheidole
- Species: P. sciophila

Binomial name
- Pheidole sciophila Wheeler, 1908

= Pheidole sciophila =

Species of ant

Pheidole sciophila is a species of big-headed ant native to the southwestern United States and northern Mexico.
