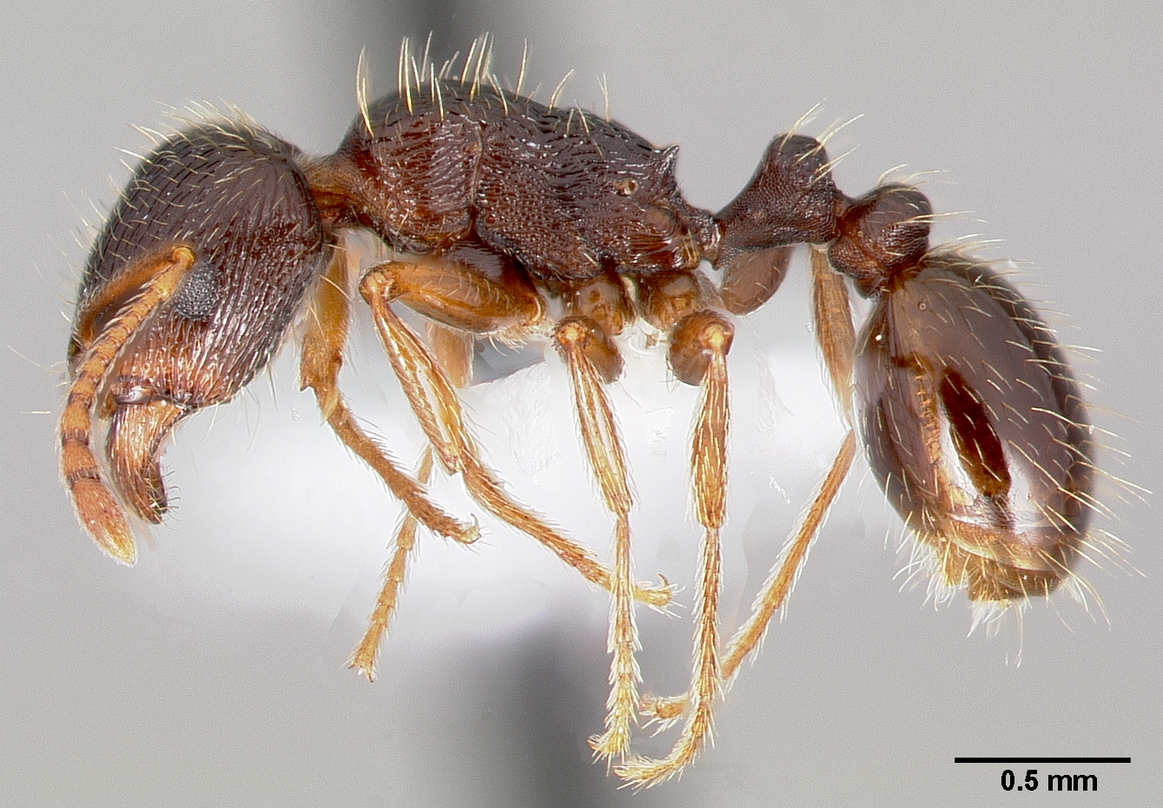
- Tetramorium immigrans worker

Scientific classification
- Kingdom: Animalia
- Phylum: Arthropoda
- Clade: Pancrustacea
- Class: Insecta
- Order: Hymenoptera
- Family: Formicidae
- Subfamily: Myrmicinae
- Genus: Tetramorium
- Species: T. immigrans

Binomial name
- Tetramorium immigrans Santschi, 1927

= Tetramorium immigrans =

Species of ant

Tetramorium immigrans—also known as the immigrant pavement ant, pavement ant, (Note: Not to be confused with Tetramorium caespitum.) and the sugar ant in parts of North America (Note: Not to be confused with the banded sugar ant, Camponotus consobrinus.)—is an ant native to Europe, which also occurs as an introduced pest in North America. Its common name comes from the fact that colonies in North America usually make their nests under pavement. This is one of the most commonly seen ants in North America, being well adapted to urban and suburban habitats. It is distinguished by a single pair of spines on the back, two nodes on the petiole, and grooves on the head and thorax.

Pavement ants have been studied on the International Space Station in 2014.

== Description ==
The pavement ant is dark brown to blackish, and 2.5–4 millimeters (0.10–0.16 in) long. A colony is composed of workers, alates, drones (male ants), and a queen. Workers do have a small stinger, which can cause mild discomfort in humans but is essentially harmless. Alates, or new queen ants and drones, have wings, and are at least twice as large as the workers.

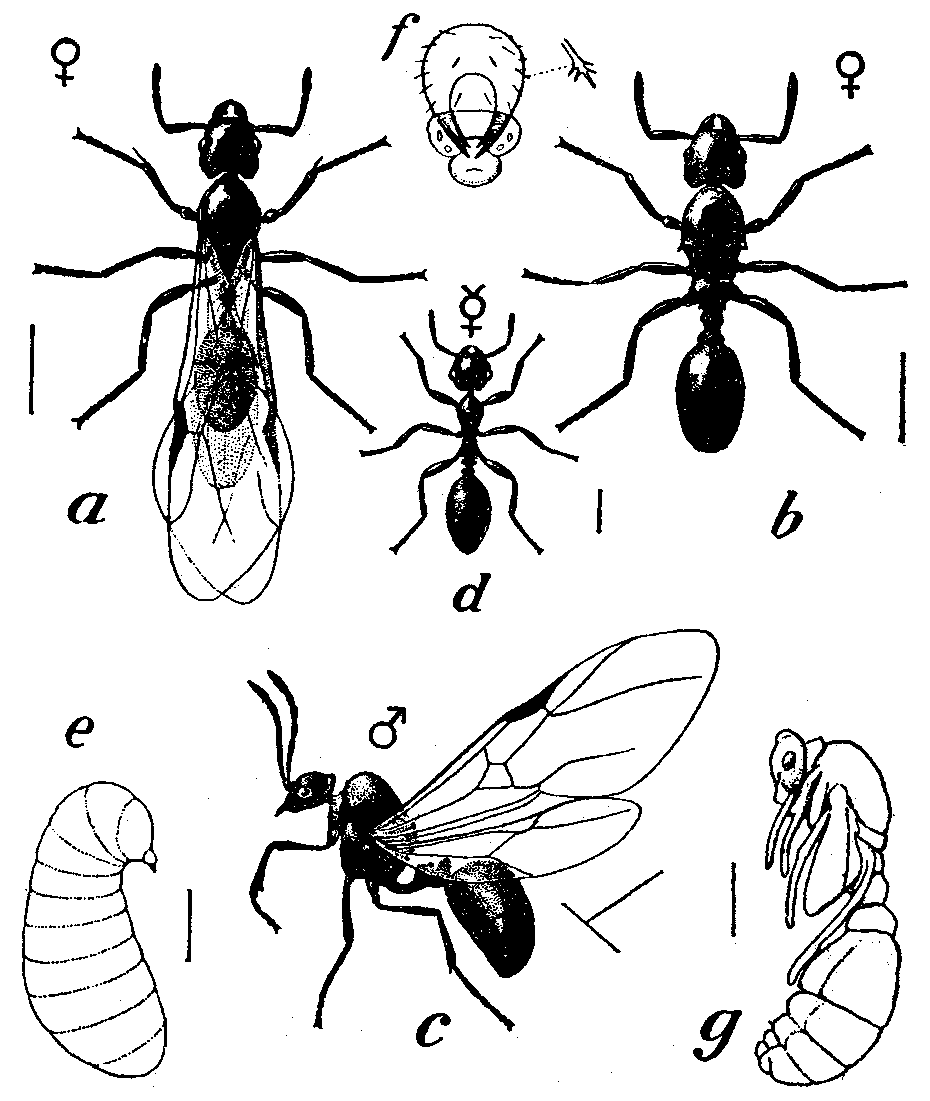
Diagram of the pavement ant. (a = queen; b = queen after loss of wings; c = male, d = worker, e = larva; g = pupa; f = head of larva more highly magnified)

Tetramorium nuptial flights occur in spring and summer; queens and drones leave the nest and find a mate. The drone's only job is to mate with the virgin queens. The dealate, or newly fertilized queen, sheds her wings, finds a suitable nesting location and digs a founding chamber called the clausteral chamber or cell. The queen must raise the first generation of young herself until they are old enough to forage for food. During this period she survives by metabolizing the proteins of her flight muscles. As the eggs hatch and the ants develop, they spend that time, about two to three months, tending to the queen of their colony; they will continue helping in the colony until they are a month old.

Older workers forage for food and defend the colony. They will eat almost anything, including other insects, seeds, honeydew, honey, bread, meats, nuts, ice cream, and other food like cheese. Although they do not usually nest inside buildings, they may become a minor nuisance to humans as they enter homes, attracted by food left out. They are also predators of codling moth larvae.

== Habitat and nests ==
Tetramorium immigrans creates nests that are shallow to moderately deep in pavement cracks, compacted soil, and other disturbed urban substrates. Multiple surveys have indicated that the nests occupy a surface area of between 1.2-4.8 m², with workers defending a surrounding area of approximately 43 m², but there is variation observed throughout colonies that are outside of this bracket. T. immigrans nests consist of an internal structure with many different interconnect chambers and galleries. The majority of nest volume can be found 30-50 cm below the surface and tunnels from 6-9 mm in diameter. In certain soils, shafts and isolated chambers may reach up to 60-90 cm in depth. Nests will frequently exhibit multiple entrance points that are characterized by crater-like mounds of excavated soil, which become particularly prominent in the warmer season during periods of increasing foraging.

=== Colony size and inter-colony interactions ===
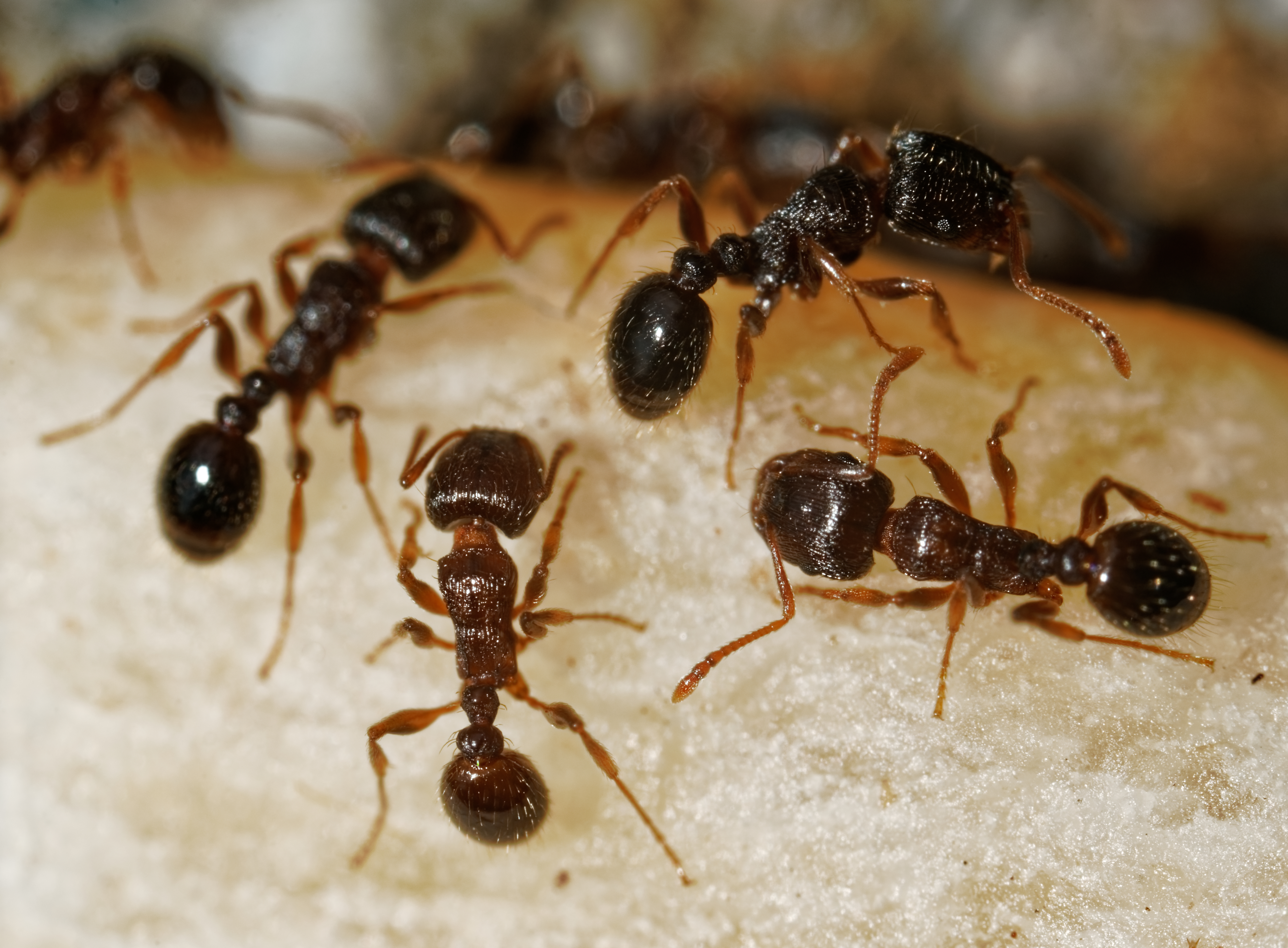
Tetramorium immigrans ants foraging, August 2022, Cincinnati, Ohio, US

Colonies of T. immigrans are relatively large when compared to the colonies of similar temperate ant species. Field observations have commonly reported colony sizes that range from a few thousand workers to over 10,000 individuals in nests that have been well-established. Rapid growth is possible for nests in the first 1-2 years of a colony being founded. A colony can be started by a single queen that is responsible for all reproduction for the lifetime of her colony. In some cases nests may occasionally have two or more queens.

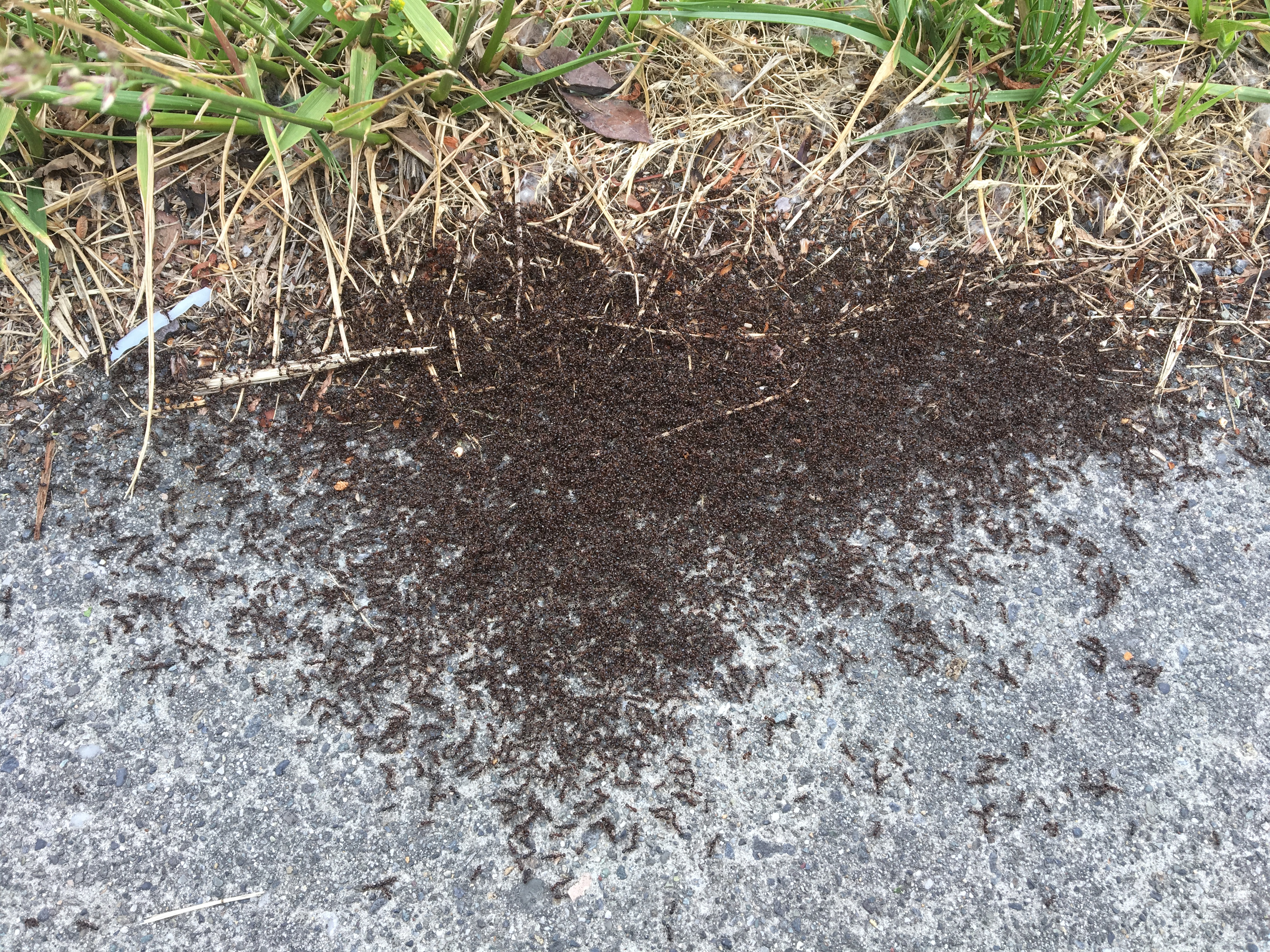
Battle between pavement ant colonies on sidewalk, May 2019, Mount Vernon, Washington, US

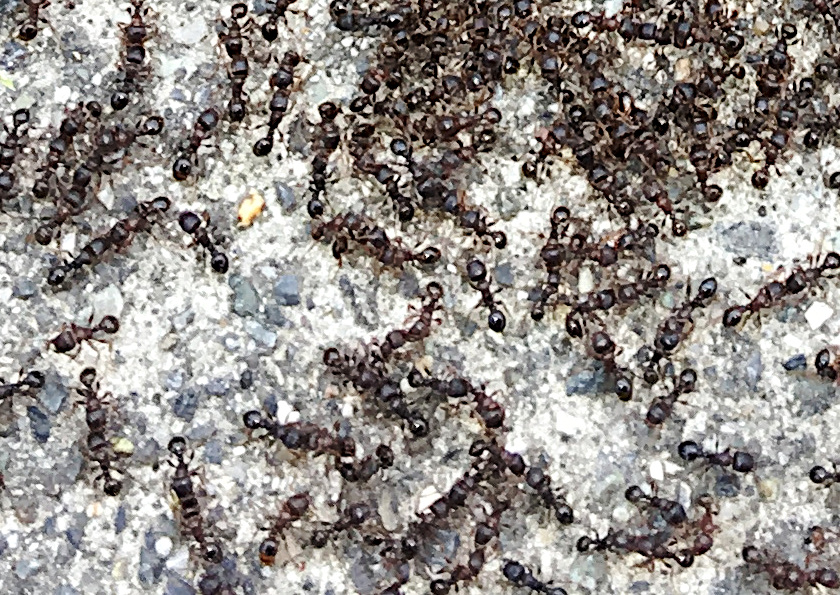
Closeup of battling ants in previous image. Workers can be seen in pairs head-to-head with mandibles locked on each other.

Neighboring, unrelated colonies of T. immigrans are highly territorial and will frequently engage in inter-colony fights that are known as "ant wars." These fights typically arise on colony borders, or when food is being contested, and will involve thousands of workers fighting on neutral battleground. The fighting is more ritualized (tugging, pulling and mass displays) than exactly lethal, since relatively few workers will die among the several thousand that participate in a prolonged fight. Recent observations have recorded complex interference behaviors during fights that include soil-dropping (blocking exits/entrances of rival nests using small debris) as a way to hinder the foraging of neighboring colonies. Colony recognition and the decision to fight are mediated via nestmate-recognition cues so that workers may respond aggressively to non-nestmates carrying different chemical signatures that do not belong to their nest.

== Parasite ==
T. immigrans serves as host to the ectoparasitic and workerless Tetramorium inquilinum ant. This parasitic ant spends its life clinging to the back of a pavement ant, particularly queens.

== Urban ecology ==
=== Urban distribution ===
T. immigrans prefers to settle in places with little to no vegetation. They are one of the few ant species that are seen to have a resurgence in population size after extensive urban development. Studies on ant diversity medians in New York City have found T. immigrans to be the most populous ant species, at upwards of 93%. They have been said to be established in approximately 39 states in the mainland U.S. and also 3 Canadian provinces. Their expansion increases readily across North America yearly.

=== Urban heat and physiological adaptations ===
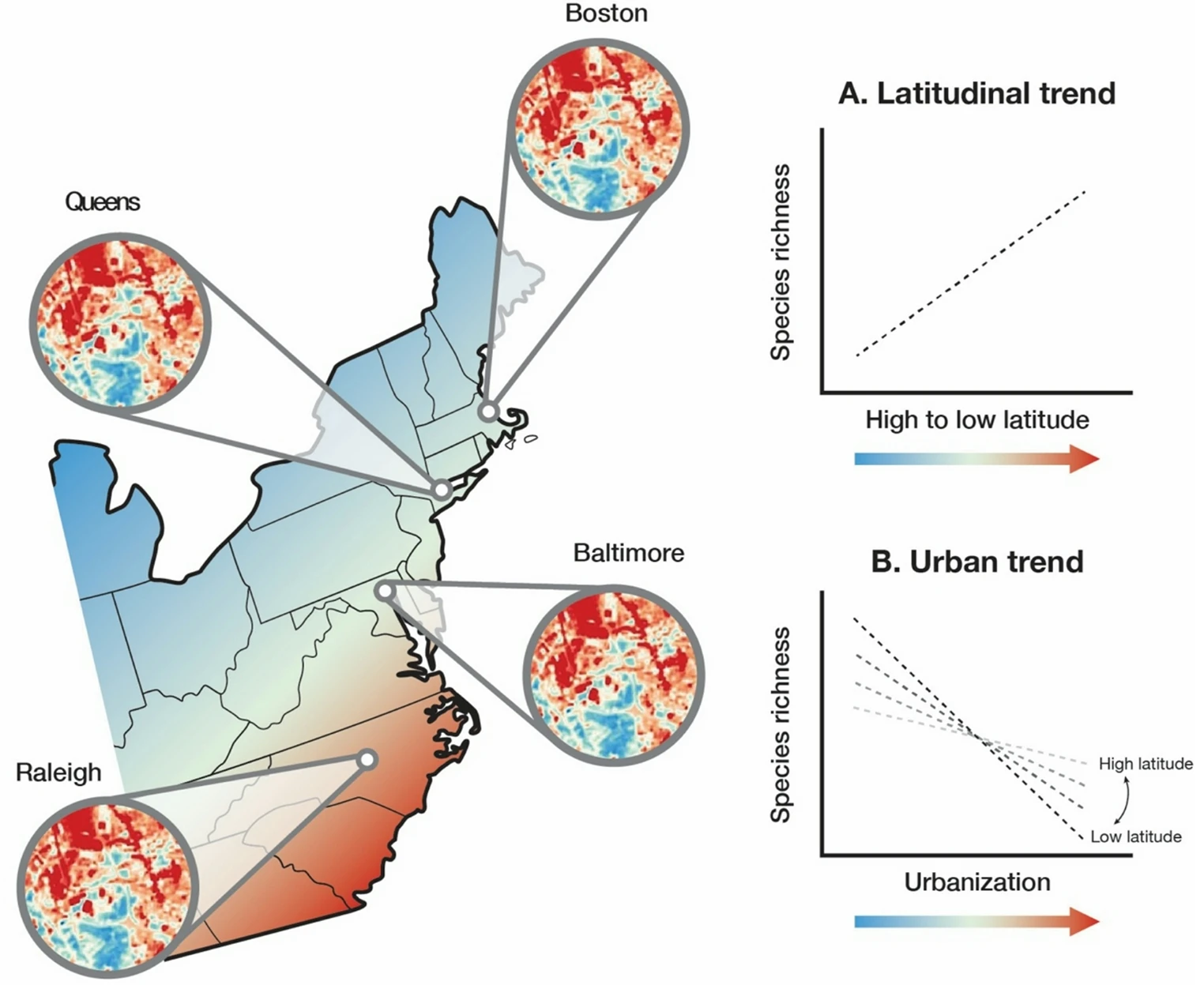
Latitudinal and urban temperature gradients among and within sampled cities

Tetramorium immigrans is tolerant of high surface temperatures that are representative of urban areas. Measurements of individuals sampled from an urban microhabitat in South Dakota observed worker ants alive at temperatures close to 46 °C. Studies of related ant species in similar urban habitats showed that prolonged exposure to city heat-island conditions lead to an increased thermal tolerance compared to rural colonies, demonstrating heat as a potential selective pressure on physiology. Individuals with traits that favor heat tolerance are more likely to survive and reproduce, forming colonies that are uniformly resistant to urban heat.

Surface temperatures in urban habitats also influence community structure and biodiversity. Surveys collected across multiple North American cities show that warmer and impervious urban landscapes support lower overall diversity, yet they favor heat and disturbance-tolerant species such as T. immigrans. This reduction in biodiversity may further reinforce the dominance of heat-adapted ants, and, over time, the effects of temperature-driven selection and simplified urban communities promotes adaptations that enhance T. immigrans’ success in warm, paved, and impervious environments.

=== Community effects and urban selection ===
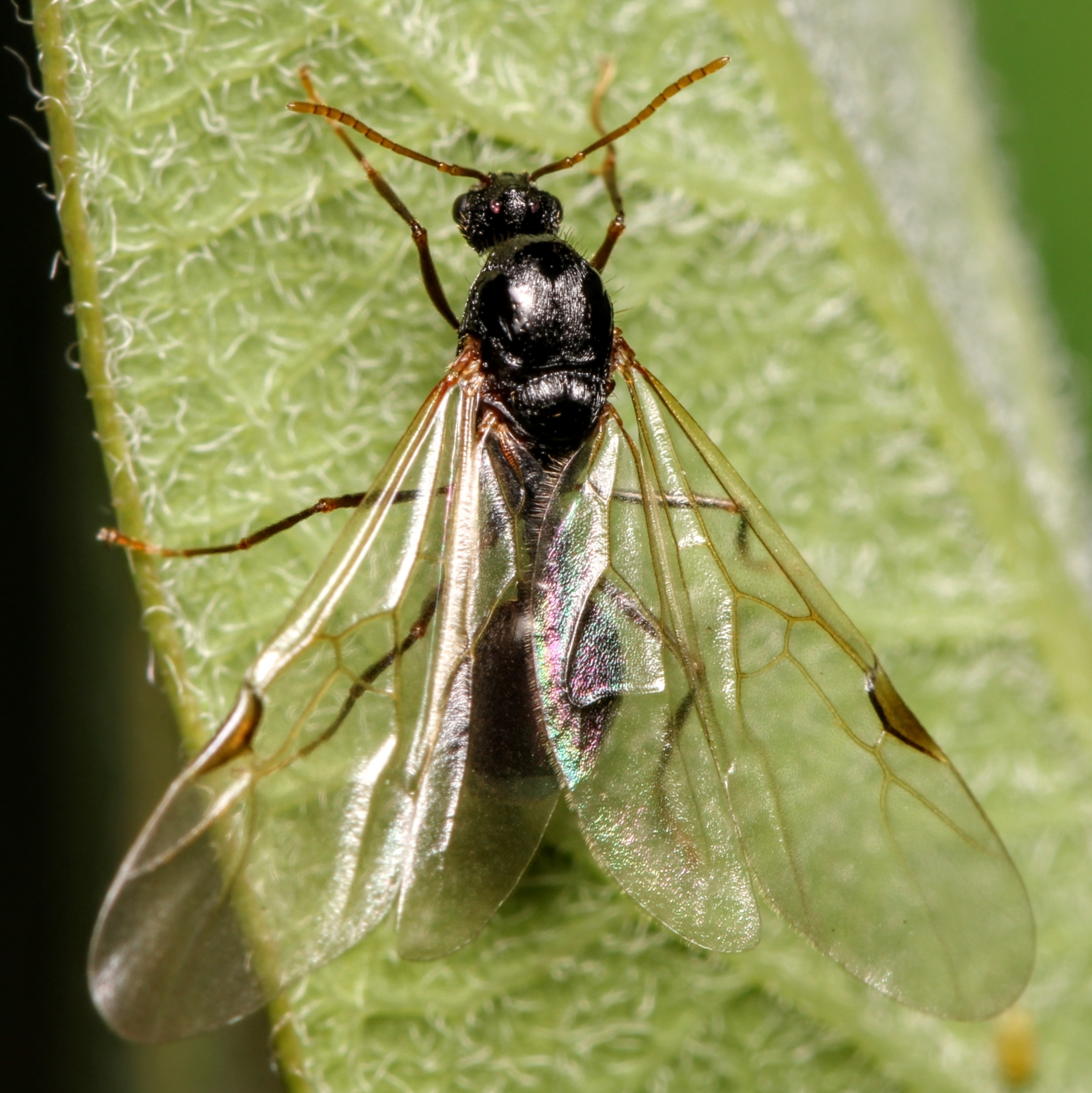
Winged T. immigrans worker

T. immigrans tends to prevail and dominate in the habitats in which it settles in. This is primarily caused by the flexible foraging strategies, generalist diet, and tolerance of human activity in the urban environments that it occupies. Colonies can be observed occupying pavement cracks, structural foundations, and compacted soil where temperature and moisture levels vary greatly. Additional observations show that T.immigrans exploits any food or nutrient source that can be found. When a source of food is discovered, a worker can quickly recruit other workers to the source of food far faster than any other competing native ant species.

Urbanization also has a major impact on influencing the community structures in T. immigrans. When studied across urban gradients, T. immigrans is found to be disproportionately associated with impervious areas such as pavements and sidewalks that are characteristic of urban microhabitats. T. immigrans abundance increases with the level of urbanization that can be found in a given area, which is in contrast with its close neighbors in the same area. Closely related ant species will tend to decrease in abundance and favor less disturbed areas that have not been subject to urbanization. This pattern demonstrates the dominance of T. immigrans in the impervious microhabitats that urbanization and human activity create, as other closely related ant species cannot tolerate the same conditions.

=== Range expansion and evolutionary dynamics ===
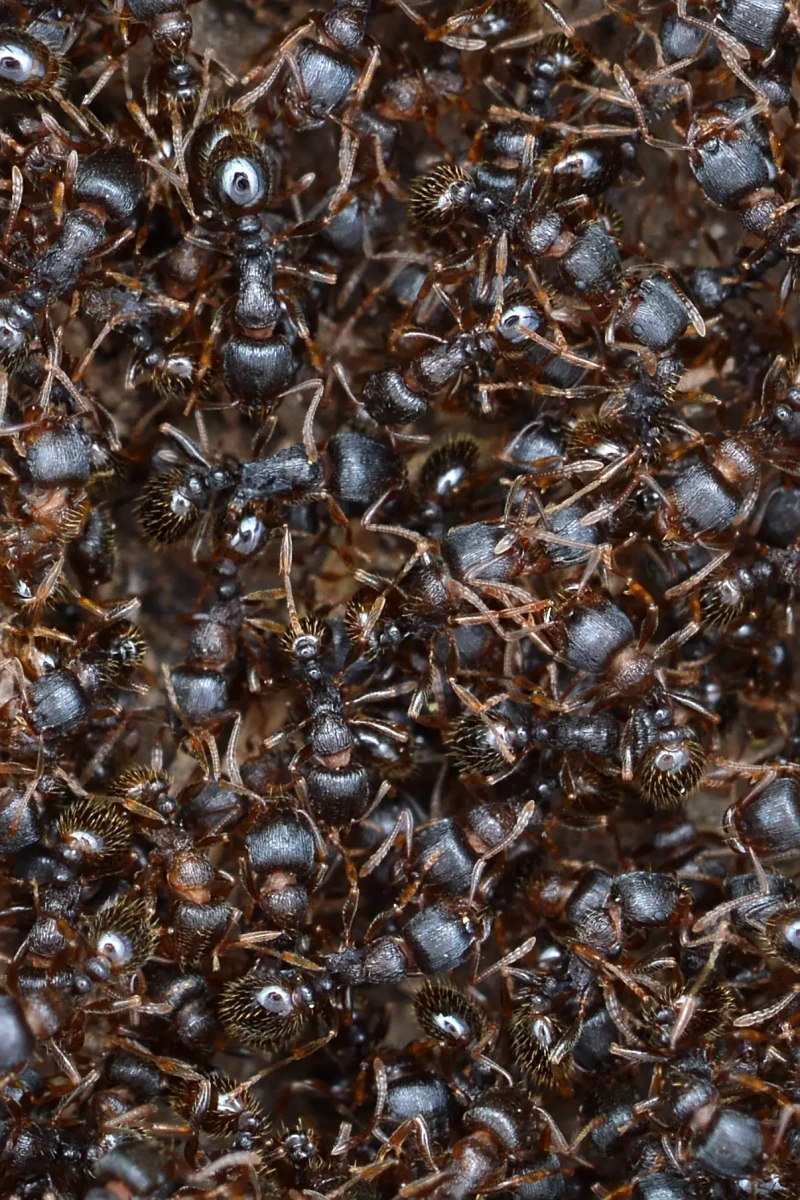
A mass of Tetramorium immigrans ants amongst each other.

In urban arenas, T. immigrans is better able to expand its range due to the altering climate conditions. Cities are great at trapping heat, so this allows the species to survive in a place that would normally be too cold and have increased fitness, expanding their realized niche. Genetic testing has also uncovered distinct genetic T. immigrans sub-clusters in distant locations. These sub-clusters, when tested, appeared to be unexpectedly genetically similar even though theoretically it should be the opposite. This indicates possible accidental human-mediated dispersal, which has inadvertently expanded the species's range.

Urbanization greatly influences cross-species contact. There are studies referencing hybridization between T. immigrans and T. caespitum. Urban areas act as ecological contact zones by removing natural barriers and concentrating species in places where they wouldn't normally meet. Human disturbance modifies evolutionary landscapes, creating novel selective pressures and more opportunities for gene flow. With more gene flow comes new alleles, which better help T. immigrans adapt to urban environments. Additionally, T. immigrans in North America have been found to have exceptionally low levels of genetic diversity, with researchers speculating they descend from a similar lineage around two centuries ago. However, there is no detection of inbreeding amongst the species, which is a typical attribute for an invasive ant species.

== Systematics ==
Tetramorium immigrans is a member of the Tetramorium caespitum complex, which includes 10 species of the genus:

- Tetramorium alpestre Steiner, Schlick-Steiner & Seifert, 2010
- Tetramorium breviscapus Wagner et al., 2017
- Tetramorium caespitum (Linnaeus, 1758)
- Tetramorium caucasicum Wagner et al., 2017
- Tetramorium fusciclava Consani & Zangheri, 1952
- Tetramorium hungaricum Röszler, 1935
- Tetramorium immigrans Santschi, 1927
- Tetramorium impurum (Foerster, 1850)
- Tetramorium indocile Santschi, 1927
- Tetramorium staerckei Kratochvíl, 1944

These species are native to Europe. In addition, Tetramorium immigrans is common and widespread in North America.

The low genetic diversity of Tetramorium immigrans across North America suggests that this population resulted from the establishment of one single, or a few closely related ant colonies, about 200 years ago.

The North American species of the pavement ants has formerly been considered Tetramorium caespitum, the subspecies Tetramorium caespitum immigrans, and species E. In 2017, the Tetramorium caespitum complex was revised, and the pavement ant commonly found in North America was determined to be Tetramorium immigrans. The species is also found in southern Europe, where it originated.
