= Sugar ant =

Sugar ant may refer to:

- Carpenter ant (Camponotus spp.), a genus of large ants with worldwide distribution
- Tapinoma sessile, a species of ant native to North America
- Tetramorium immigrans, a species native to Europe and introduced to North America
- Lepisiota capensis, a species of Old World ant
- Banded sugar ant, a species of ant from Australia
