= Tetramorium curvispinosum =

Scientific classification
- Kingdom: Animalia
- Phylum: Arthropoda
- Clade: Pancrustacea
- Class: Insecta
- Order: Hymenoptera
- Family: Formicidae
- Subfamily: Myrmicinae
- Genus: Tetramorium
- Species: T. curvispinosum

Binomial name
- Tetramorium curvispinosum Mayr, 1897

Species of ant

Tetramorium curvispinosum is a species of ant in the subfamily Myrmicinae. It is found in Sri Lanka.
