= Tetramorium transversarium =

Scientific classification
- Kingdom: Animalia
- Phylum: Arthropoda
- Clade: Pancrustacea
- Class: Insecta
- Order: Hymenoptera
- Family: Formicidae
- Subfamily: Myrmicinae
- Genus: Tetramorium
- Species: T. transversarium

Binomial name
- Tetramorium transversarium Roger, 1863

Species of ant

Tetramorium transversarium, is a species of ant in the subfamily Myrmicinae. It is found in Sri Lanka.
