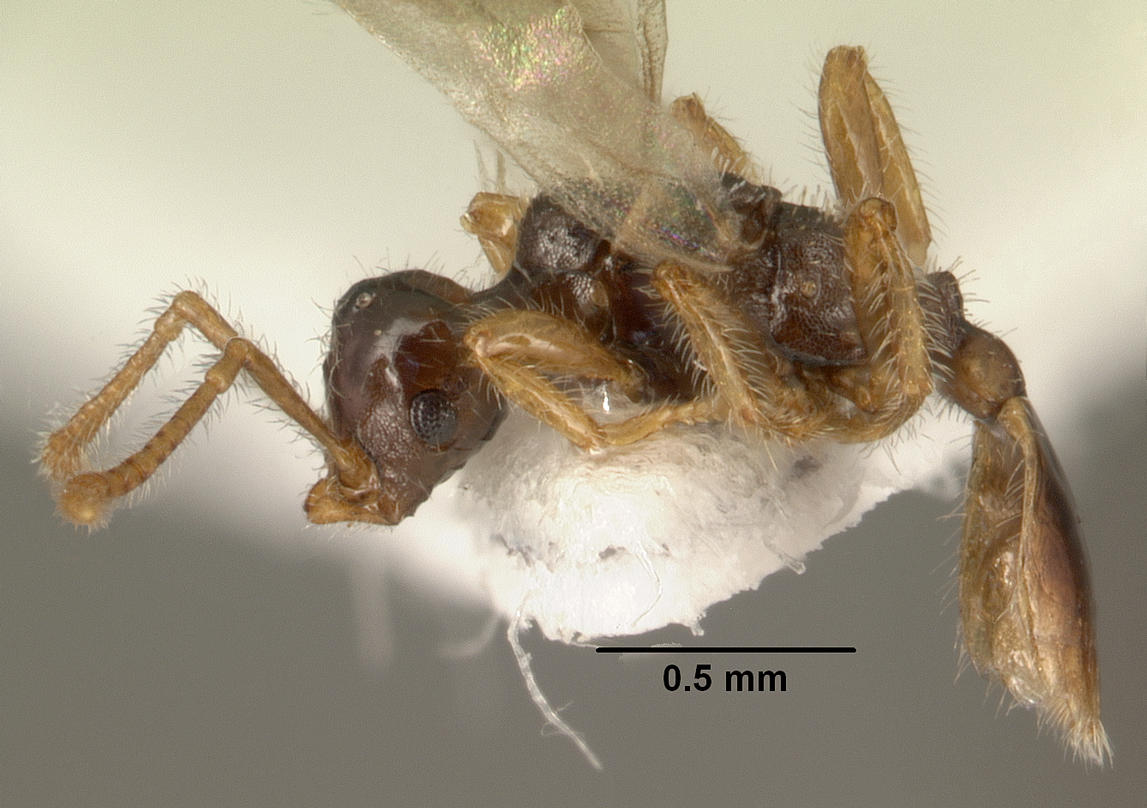
- T. inquilinum alate queen from France

Conservation status
- Vulnerable (IUCN 2.3)

Scientific classification
- Kingdom: Animalia
- Phylum: Arthropoda
- Class: Insecta
- Order: Hymenoptera
- Family: Formicidae
- Subfamily: Myrmicinae
- Genus: Tetramorium
- Species: T. inquilinum

Binomial name
- Tetramorium inquilinum Ward, Brady, Fisher & Schultz, 2015

Synonyms
- Teleutomyrmex schneideri Kutter, 1950

= Tetramorium inquilinum =

Species of ant

Tetramorium inquilinum is an ectoparasitic ant found in Europe. It was discovered by Swiss myrmecologist Heinrich Kutter. The species is unusual for lacking a worker caste, the queens and males living entirely off the care of the pavement ant. It has been called "the 'ultimate' parasitic ant" by myrmecologists Edward O. Wilson and Bert Hölldobler.

== Taxonomy ==
Kutter described the species in 1950, naming it Teleutomyrmex schneideri and designating it the type species of its newly-circumscribed genus. He named it after his teacher and friend Otto Schneider-Orelli. Kutter discovered the holotype himself; the species's type locality is Saas-Fee, Valais, Switzerland. The genus name, "Teleutomyrmex", meant "last" or "final" ant.

In a 2015 revision of the subfamily Myrmicinae, Philip S. Ward, Seán G. Brady, Brian L. Fisher, and Ted R. Schultz classified the genus Teleutomyrmex as a junior synonym of Tetramorium. They created a nomen novum for this species, T. inquilinum, due to the presence of a senior homonym: Tetramorium schneideri Emery, 1898; Carlo Emery had named this species after a different individual, Oskar Schneider, who had collected the holotype. Ward and colleagues' replacement specific epithet refers to the species's inquiline behavior (Latin: inquilīnus, lit. 'inhabitant, tenant'). This synonymy is contested in one paper, on the basis of the monophyly of the Teleutomyrmex complex and its very specific biology.

== Distribution ==
This species has been found in the Swiss Alps, the French Alps, the French Pyrenees, Spain, and Turkmenistan.

== Morphology ==
The body shape of Tetramorium inquilinum is specifically adapted. The queens average 2.5 mm in length, and have a concave form and large pads and claws. Tetramorium inquilinum is frail and unable to care for itself: its mandibles are too small and weak to handle anything but liquid food, its sting and poison glands are small, and glands that produce food for larvae and protection against bacteria are completely absent. Its exoskeleton is thin and its brain and central nerve cord are small and simplified.

== Behavior ==
Tetramorium inquilinum constantly sends chemical signals that trick host ants into accepting them as full members of the colony. Being ectoparasitic, Tetramorium inquilinum spends most of its adult life clinging to the backs of its hosts, especially queens. As many as eight have been observed piggy-backing onto a single host queen, leaving her immobile.

== Diet ==
Tetramorium inquilinum lives entirely on food regurgitated by its hosts, even the liquid meant for the host queen.

== Reproduction ==
Nourished and nurtured well by its hosts, Tetramorium inquilinum has high fecundity. Older individuals lay an average of two eggs every minute.
