= Tetramorium yerburyi =

Scientific classification
- Kingdom: Animalia
- Phylum: Arthropoda
- Clade: Pancrustacea
- Class: Insecta
- Order: Hymenoptera
- Family: Formicidae
- Subfamily: Myrmicinae
- Genus: Tetramorium
- Species: T. yerburyi

Binomial name
- Tetramorium yerburyi Forel, 1902

Species of ant

Tetramorium yerburyi is a species of ant in the subfamily Myrmicinae. It is found in Sri Lanka and China.
