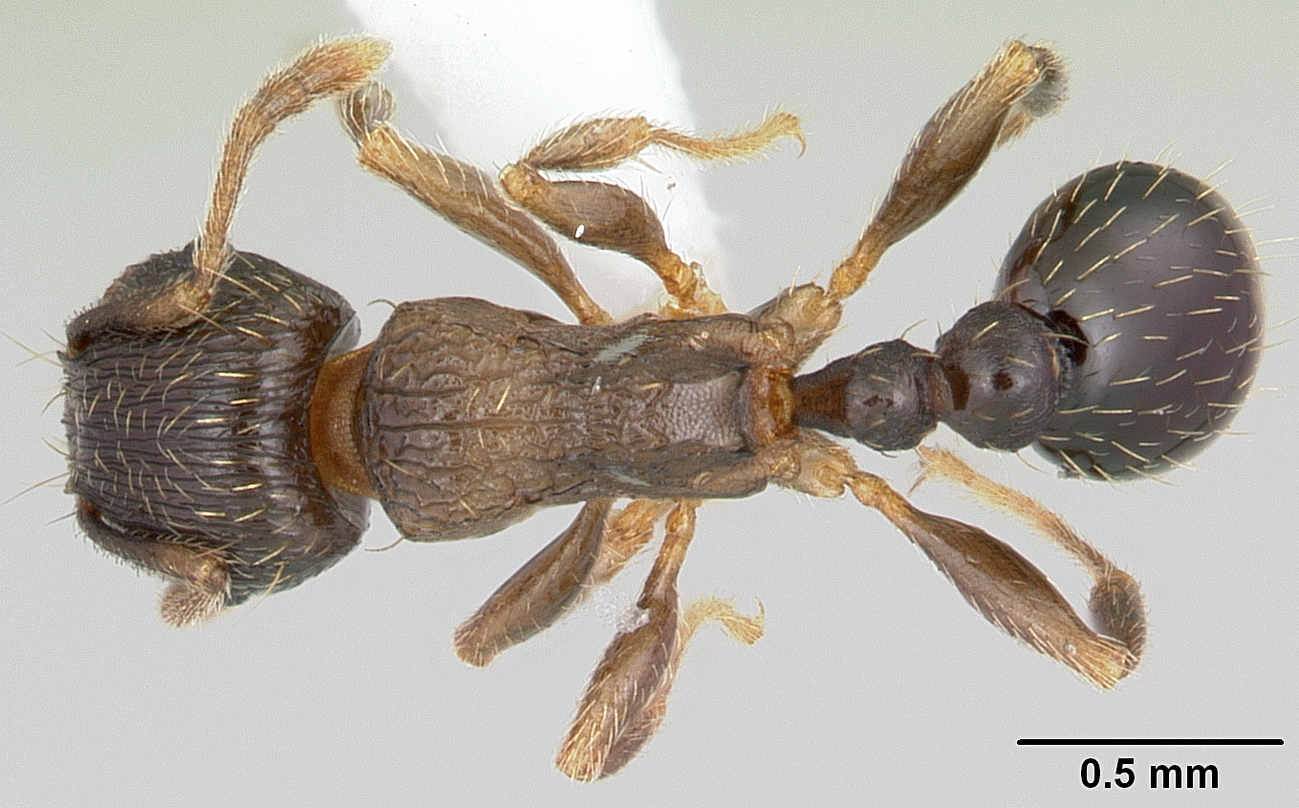

Scientific classification
- Kingdom: Animalia
- Phylum: Arthropoda
- Clade: Pancrustacea
- Class: Insecta
- Order: Hymenoptera
- Family: Formicidae
- Subfamily: Myrmicinae
- Genus: Tetramorium
- Species: T. tsushimae

Binomial name
- Tetramorium tsushimae Emery, 1925

= Tetramorium tsushimae =

Species of ant

Tetramorium tsushimae, the Japanese pavement ant, is a species of ant in the family Formicidae.

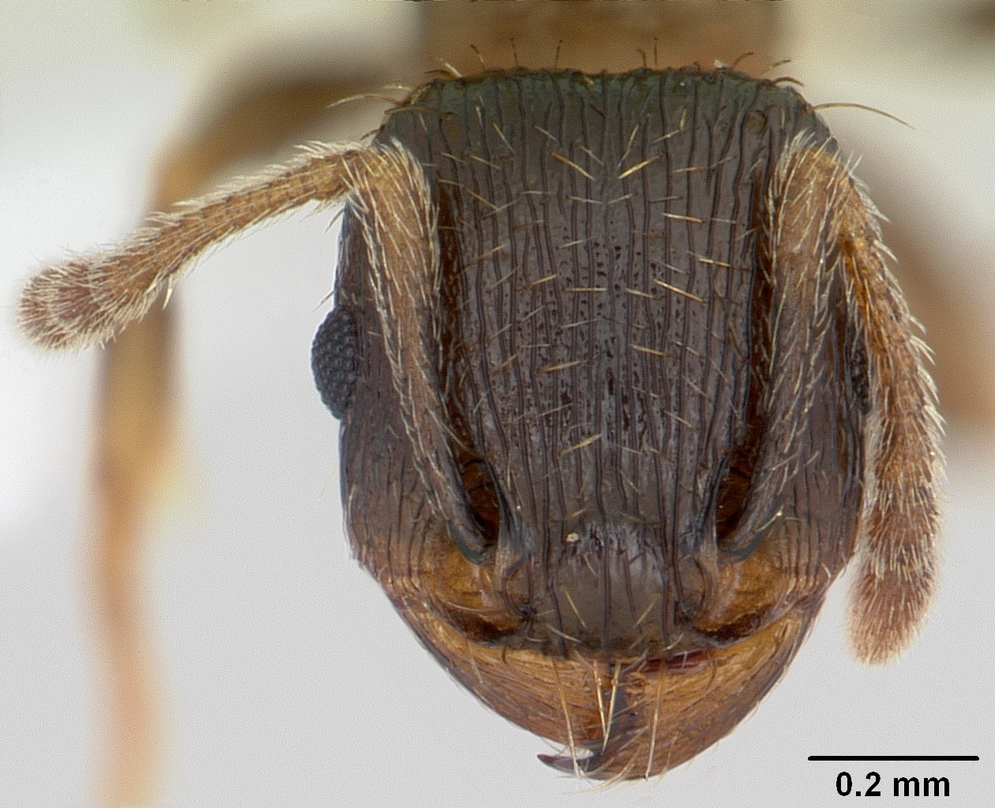
Japanese pavement ant, Tetramorium tsushimae

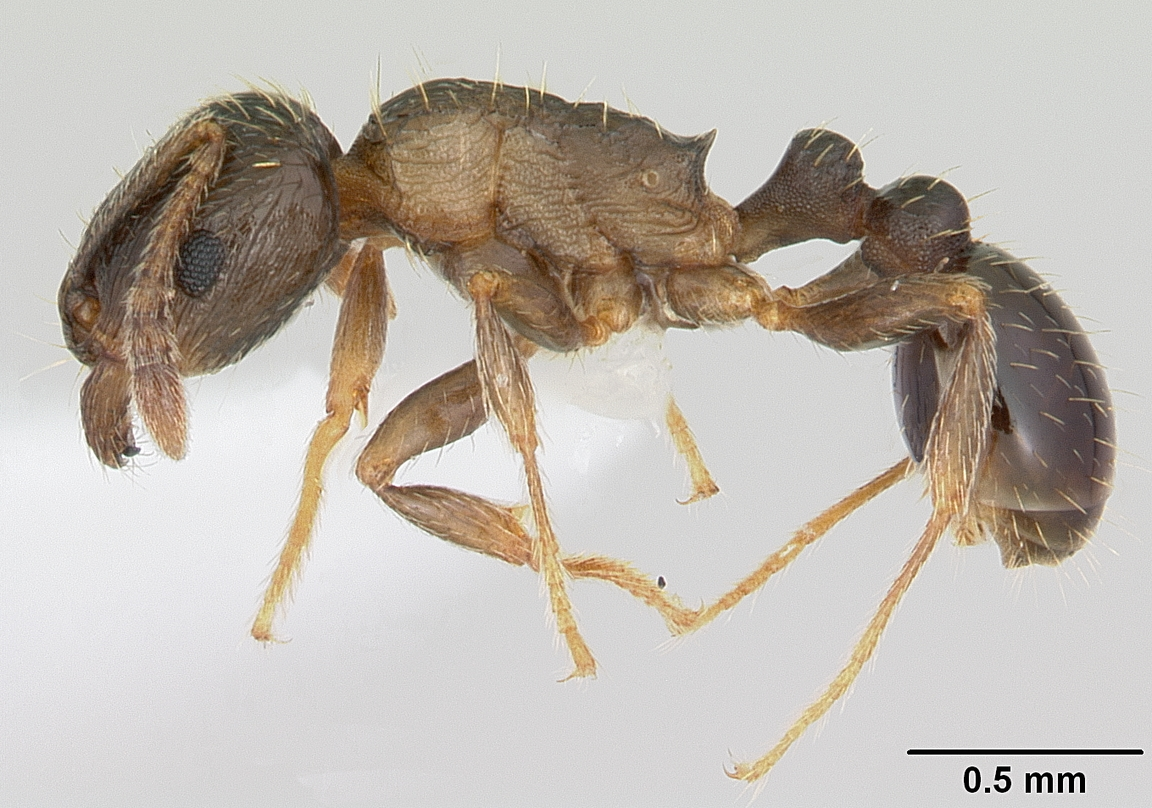
Japanese pavement ant, Tetramorium tsushimae

== Genomics ==
A chromosome-level genome assembly of Tetramorium tsushimae was published in 2026, providing the first reference genome for the species. The genome is approximately 259.2 Mb in size and comprises 13 chromosomes. The assembly has a BUSCO completeness of 98.4% and contains 34,352 predicted protein-coding genes.
