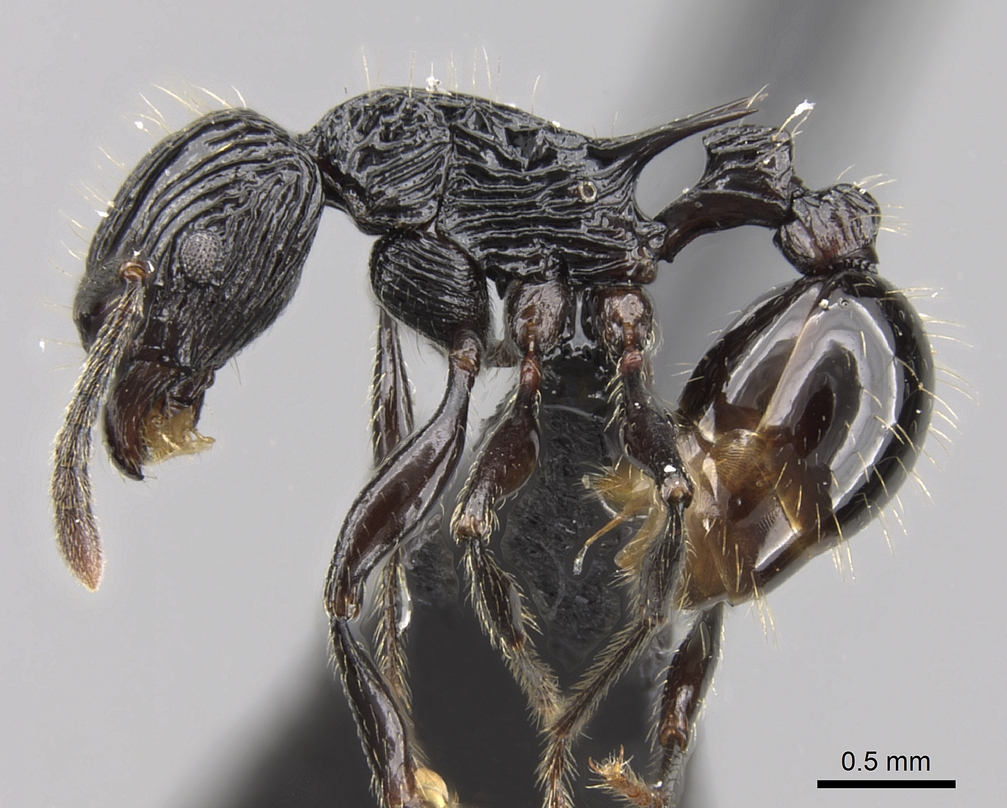
- Tetramorium smaug worker

Scientific classification
- Domain: Eukaryota
- Kingdom: Animalia
- Phylum: Arthropoda
- Class: Insecta
- Order: Hymenoptera
- Family: Formicidae
- Subfamily: Myrmicinae
- Genus: Tetramorium
- Species: T. smaug

Binomial name
- Tetramorium smaug Hita Garcia & Fisher, 2012

= Tetramorium smaug =

Species of ant

Tetramorium smaug is a species of myrmicine ant native to Ambatovy, Amber Mountain National Park, and Ivohibe in Madagascar. It was found in montane rainforests around elevations of 900–1,300 metres (3,000–4,300 ft). It is believed to live in vegetation as opposed to on the forest floor. Coloration is dark brown or black. The head and mesosoma have rough surfaces while the gaster is smooth. The head has a large number of hairs, but the amount of hair decreases on each segment posteriorly. The species has long propodeal spines with a broad base. It was named after the dragon Smaug from J. R. R. Tolkien's novel The Hobbit.
