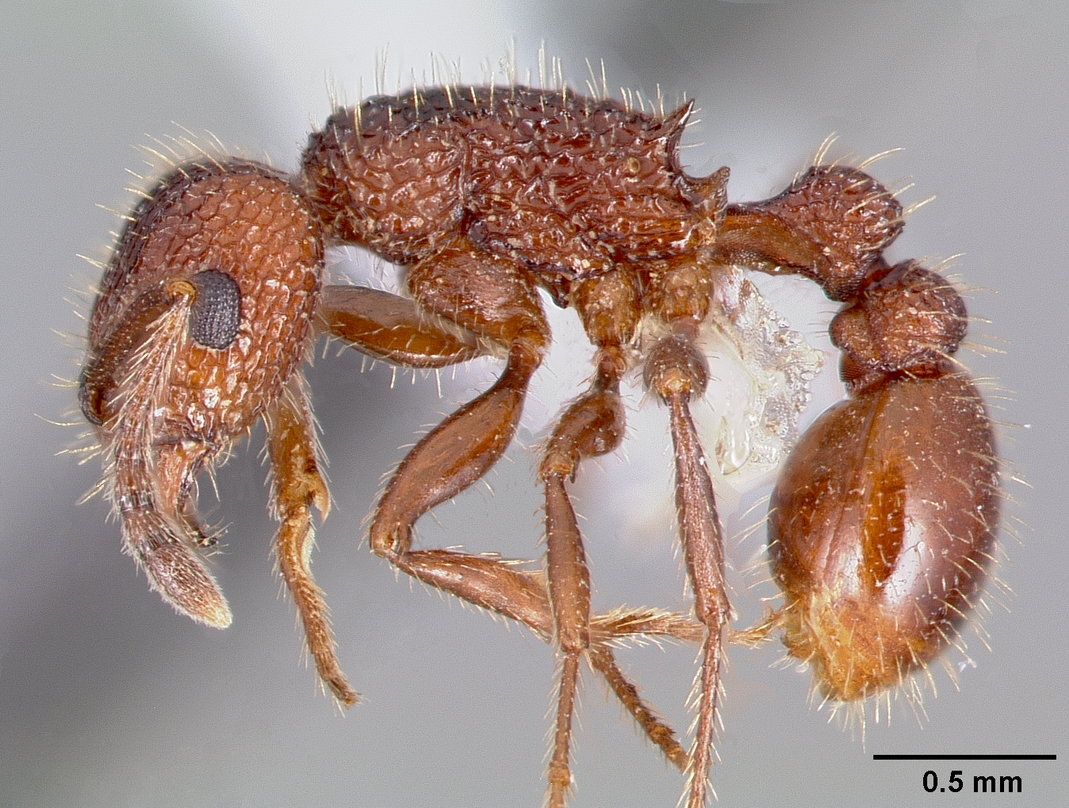

Scientific classification
- Kingdom: Animalia
- Phylum: Arthropoda
- Clade: Pancrustacea
- Class: Insecta
- Order: Hymenoptera
- Family: Formicidae
- Subfamily: Myrmicinae
- Genus: Tetramorium
- Species: T. hispidum

Binomial name
- Tetramorium hispidum (Wheeler, 1915)

= Tetramorium hispidum =

Species of ant

Tetramorium hispidum is a species of ant in the subfamily Myrmicinae. Tetramorium hispidum differs from similar ants in the Myrmicinae subfamily by the structure surrounding the ant's antennal insertions. Short, stubble-like hairs exist on the pronotum and frontal carinae. The antenna of Tetramorium hispidum contains 11 segments.

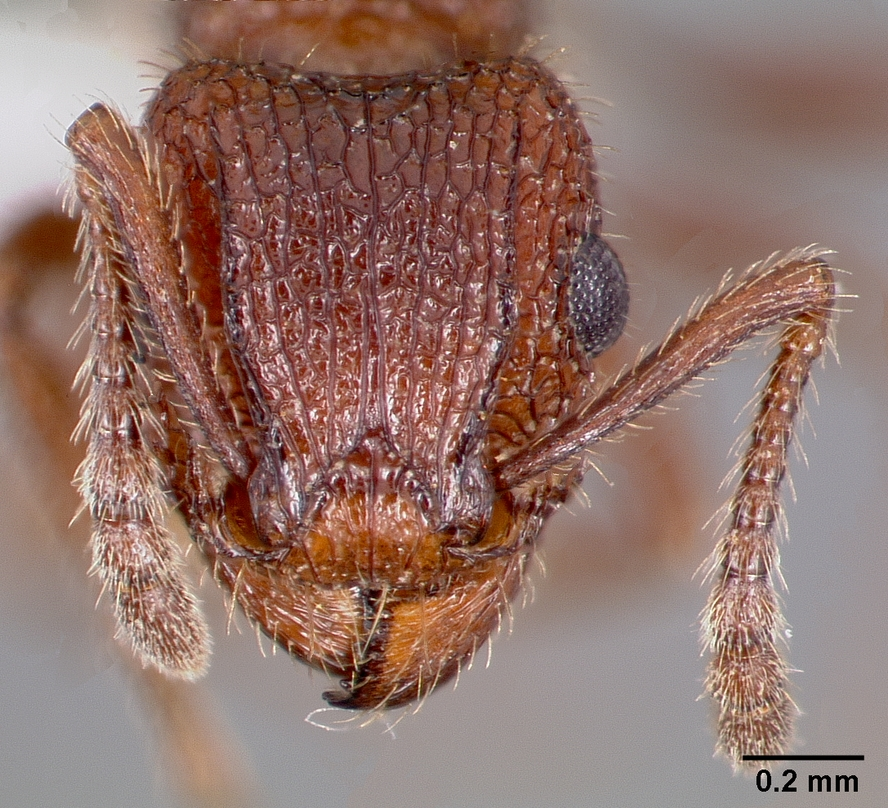

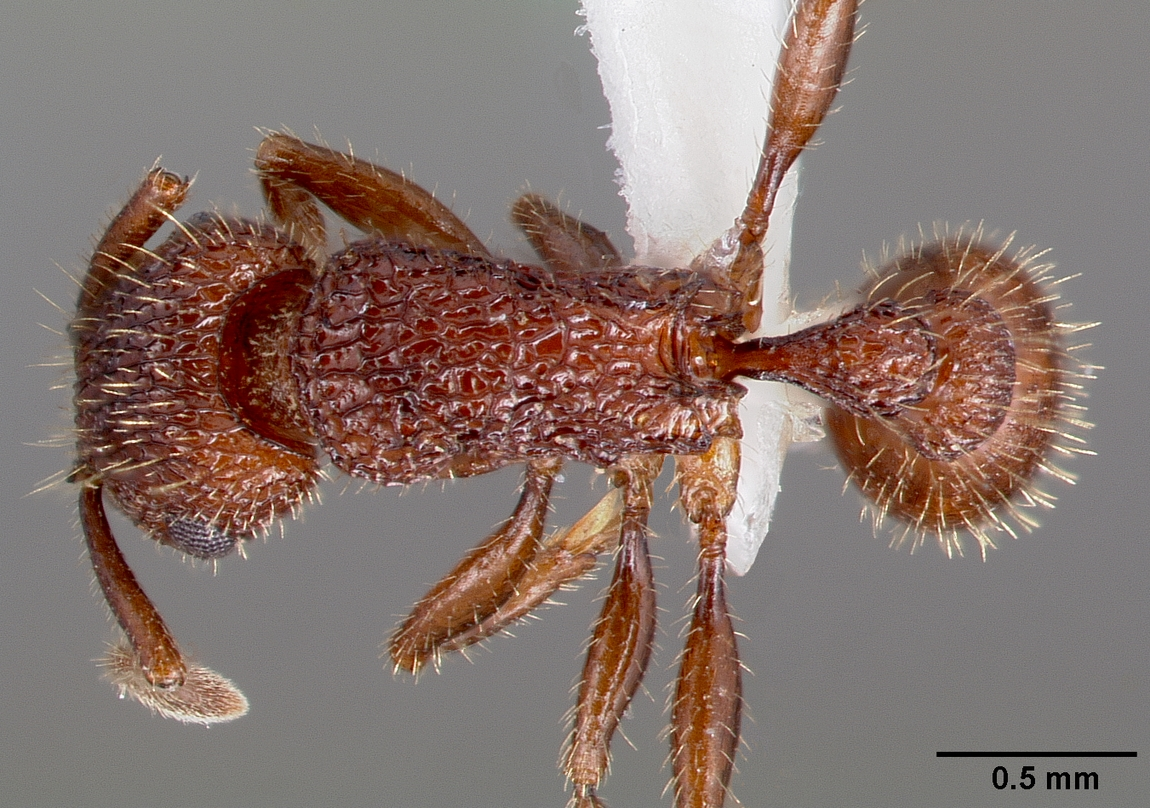
