= Tetramorium flinex =

Conservation status
- Vulnerable (IUCN 2.3)

Scientific classification
- Kingdom: Animalia
- Phylum: Arthropoda
- Class: Insecta
- Order: Hymenoptera
- Family: Formicidae
- Subfamily: Myrmicinae
- Genus: Tetramorium
- Species: T. flinex

Binomial name
- Tetramorium flinex Fisher, 2025

Species of ant

Tetramorium flinex is a species of ant in the genus Tetramorium. It is endemic to Spain.
