= Tetramorium pilosum =

Scientific classification
- Kingdom: Animalia
- Phylum: Arthropoda
- Clade: Pancrustacea
- Class: Insecta
- Order: Hymenoptera
- Family: Formicidae
- Subfamily: Myrmicinae
- Genus: Tetramorium
- Species: T. pilosum

Binomial name
- Tetramorium pilosum Emery, 1893

Species of ant

Tetramorium pilosum, is a species of ant in the subfamily Myrmicinae. It is found in Sri Lanka, and China.
