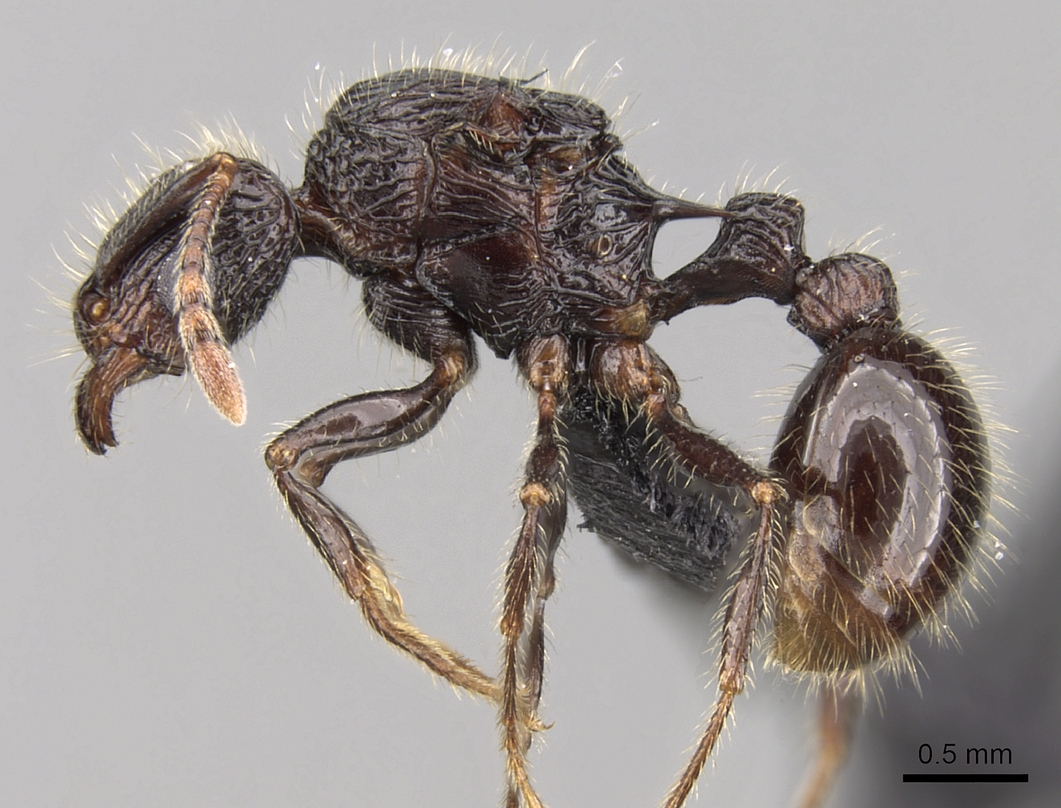
- Tetramorium nazgul dealate queen

Scientific classification
- Domain: Eukaryota
- Kingdom: Animalia
- Phylum: Arthropoda
- Class: Insecta
- Order: Hymenoptera
- Family: Formicidae
- Subfamily: Myrmicinae
- Genus: Tetramorium
- Species: T. nazgul

Binomial name
- Tetramorium nazgul Hita Garcia & Fisher, 2012

= Tetramorium nazgul =

Species of ant

Tetramorium nazgul is a species of Myrmicine ant native to Analalava, Ambohijanahary, and the Zombitse-Vohibasia National Park, Madagascar. The species is characterized by long, thin, propodeal spines. Its body is covered in a multitude of long hairs. General coloration is dark brown or black, with lighter coloration on the legs. The species is commonly found in leaf litter in tropical dry forests and montane rainforests, typically around elevations of 700 to 1,100 meters (2,300 to 3,600 ft). It was named after the Nazgûl from J. R. R. Tolkien's The Lord of the Rings.
