= Tetramorium tortuosum =

Scientific classification
- Kingdom: Animalia
- Phylum: Arthropoda
- Clade: Pancrustacea
- Class: Insecta
- Order: Hymenoptera
- Family: Formicidae
- Subfamily: Myrmicinae
- Genus: Tetramorium
- Species: T. tortuosum

Binomial name
- Tetramorium tortuosum Roger, 1863

Synonyms
- Tetramorium tortuosum bellii Forel, 1902; Tetramorium tortuosum ethica Forel, 1911

Species of ant

Tetramorium tortuosum, is a species of ant in the subfamily Myrmicinae. It is found in Philippine, India, and Sri Lanka.
