= Tetramorium renae =

Scientific classification
- Kingdom: Animalia
- Phylum: Arthropoda
- Clade: Pancrustacea
- Class: Insecta
- Order: Hymenoptera
- Family: Formicidae
- Subfamily: Myrmicinae
- Genus: Tetramorium
- Species: T. renae

Binomial name
- Tetramorium renae Hita Garcia, Fischer & Peters, 2010
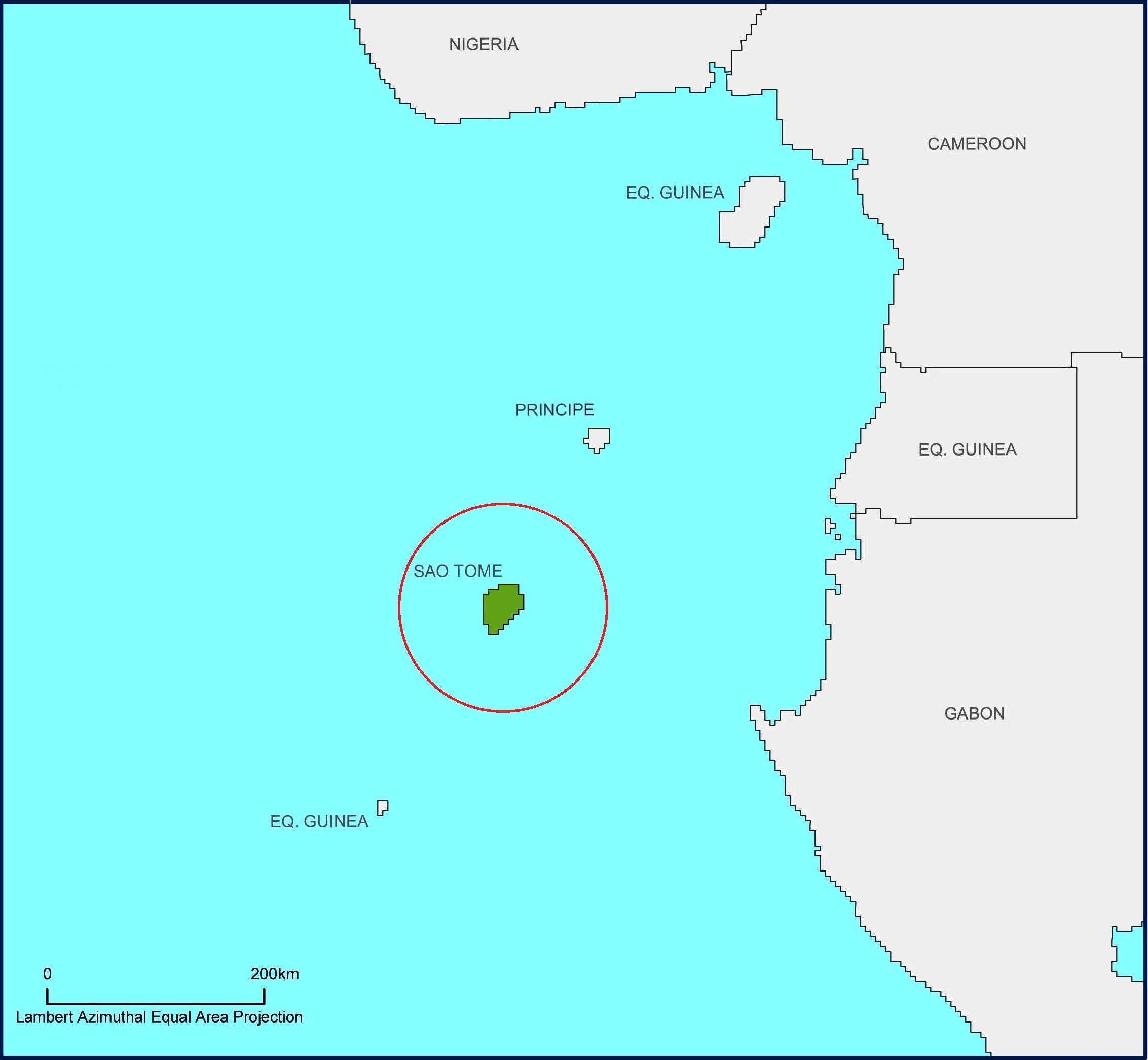
- range

Species of ant

Tetramorium renae is an ant in the family Formicidae. It occurs in São Tomé and Príncipe. The holotype was collected on São Tomé Island, at 1350 m elevation. It was first described in 2010 by Hita Garcia, Fischer & Peters.
