= Tetramorium plumosum =

Scientific classification
- Kingdom: Animalia
- Phylum: Arthropoda
- Clade: Pancrustacea
- Class: Insecta
- Order: Hymenoptera
- Family: Formicidae
- Subfamily: Myrmicinae
- Genus: Tetramorium
- Species: T. plumosum

Binomial name
- Tetramorium plumosum Bolton, 1980

Species of ant

Tetramorium plumosum is a species of ant in the subfamily Myrmicinae. This species was described by Bolton in 1980. It is currently only known from Eswatini (Swaziland).
