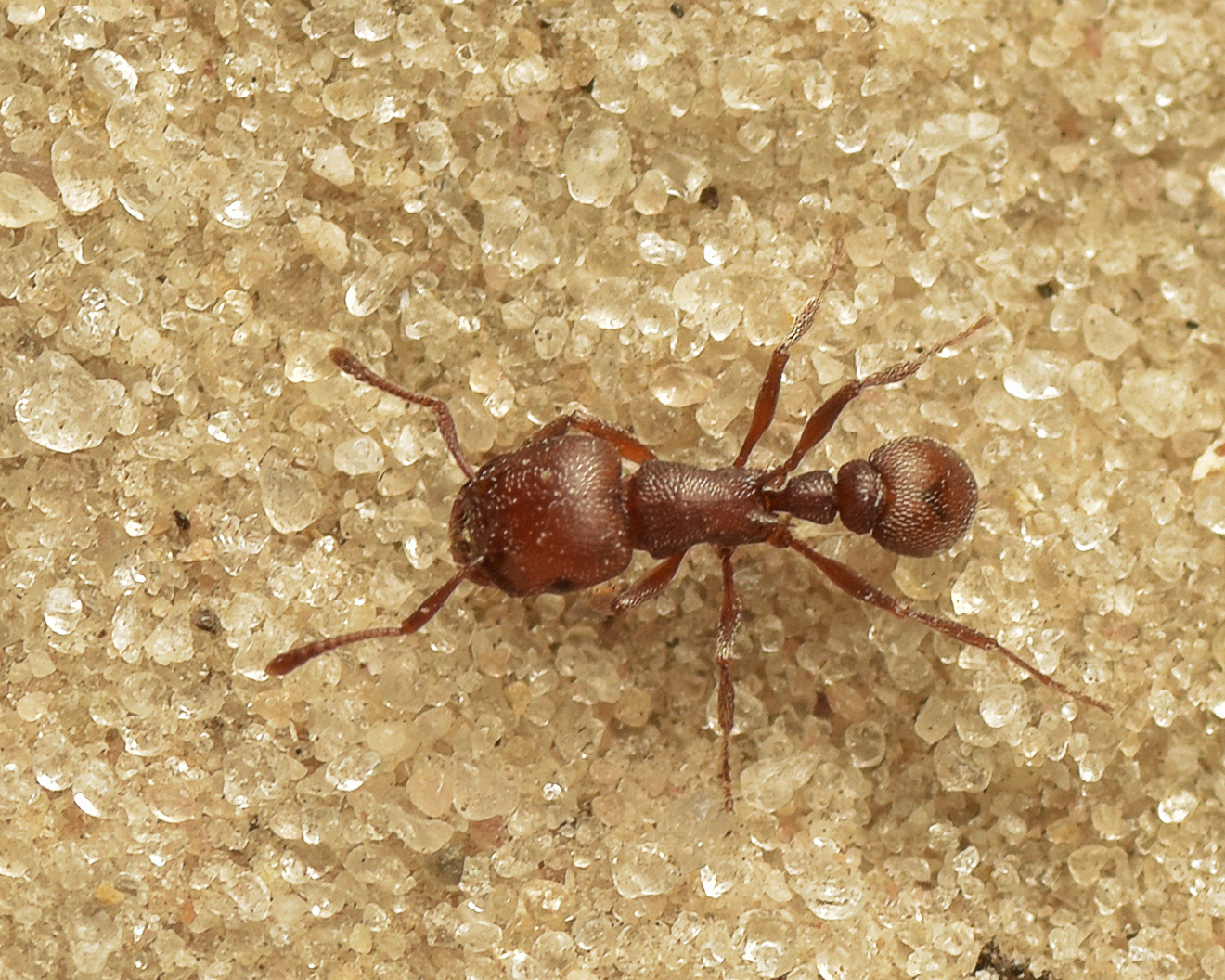
- Tetramorium setuliferum, Botswana

Scientific classification
- Kingdom: Animalia
- Phylum: Arthropoda
- Class: Insecta
- Order: Hymenoptera
- Family: Formicidae
- Subfamily: Myrmicinae
- Genus: Tetramorium
- Species: T. setuliferum

Binomial name
- Tetramorium setuliferum Emery, 1895

= Tetramorium setuliferum =

Species of ants

Tetramorium setuliferum is a species of myrmicine ant in the family Formicidae, found in southern Africa.

== Subspecies ==
These two subspecies belong to the species Tetramorium setuliferum:

- Tetramorium setuliferum cluna
- Tetramorium setuliferum setuliferum
