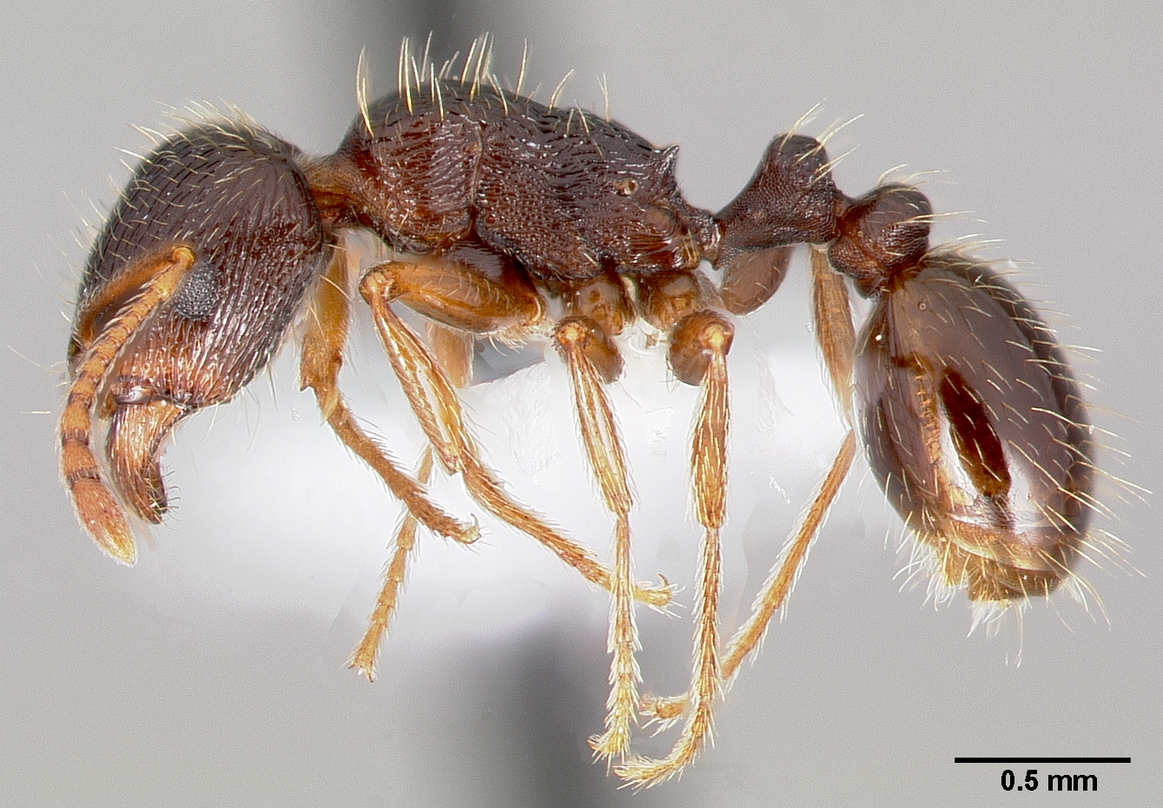
- Tetramorium caespitum worker

Scientific classification
- Kingdom: Animalia
- Phylum: Arthropoda
- Clade: Pancrustacea
- Class: Insecta
- Order: Hymenoptera
- Family: Formicidae
- Subfamily: Myrmicinae
- Tribe: Crematogastrini
- Alliance: Carebara genus group
- Genus: Tetramorium; Mayr, 1855

Diversity
- 596 species

Synonyms
- Acidomyrmex Emery, 1915; Anergates Forel, 1874; Apomyrmex Calilung, 2000; Atopula Emery, 1912; Decamorium Forel, 1913; Gonepimyrma Bernard, 1948; Hagioxenus Forel, 1910; Ireneella Donisthorpe, 1941; Lobomyrmex Kratochvíl, 1941; Macromischoides Wheeler, 1920; Rhoptromyrmex Mayr, 1901; Tetrogmus Roger, 1857; Triglyphothrix Forel, 1890; Xiphomyrmex Forel, 1887; Teleutomyrmex Kutter, 1950

= Tetramorium =

Genus of ants

Tetramorium is a genus of ants in the subfamily Myrmicinae that includes more than 520 species. These ants are also known as pavement ants.

== Taxonomy and phylogeny ==
Tetramorium was first described by Gustav Mayr in 1855 in the same publication as Monomorium.

Revision within the genus by Wagner et al. in 2017 recognized a complex of 10 cryptic species, 3 of which were raised from subspecies classifications and 2 of which were newly described. This revision also elevated the pavement ant introduced to North America as the species T. immigrans rather than the previous designation as a subspecies of T. caespitum. These 10 species in the T. caespitum complex are as follows:

- Tetramorium alpestre Steiner, Schlick-Steiner & Seifert, 2010
- Tetramorium breviscapus Wagner et al., 2017
- Tetramorium caespitum (Linnaeus, 1758)
- Tetramorium caucasicum Wagner et al., 2017
- Tetramorium fusciclava Consani & Zangheri, 1952
- Tetramorium hungaricum Röszler, 1935
- Tetramorium immigrans Santschi, 1927
- Tetramorium impurum (Foerster, 1850)
- Tetramorium indocile Santschi, 1927
- Tetramorium staerckei Kratochvíl, 1944

== Description ==
Workers of most species have a ridged clypeus, an appendaged stinger, mandibles with 3 or 4 teeth, and antennae with 11 or 12 segments or with 3-segmented clubs on the tips. The genus is divided into several species groups defined by various characters.

== Distribution ==
Most species are distributed throughout the Afrotropical and Indomalayan realms. Ten species have been recorded from Japan. One species of pavement ant, T. immigrans, is native to Europe and was probably introduced to North America starting in the 18th century.

== Biology ==
Most known species nest in the soil, in decaying wood, or in leaf litter. Some live in trees or in termite nests.

== Species ==
As of February 2026, the genus contains 596 valid species.

- Tetramorium aculeatum (Mayr, 1866)
- Tetramorium adamsi Hita Garcia & Fisher, 2012
- Tetramorium adelphon Bolton, 1979
- Tetramorium adpressum (Bolton, 1976)
- Tetramorium aegeum Radchenko, 1992
- Tetramorium africanum (Mayr, 1866)
- Tetramorium agile Arnold, 1960
- Tetramorium agna (Santschi, 1935)
- Tetramorium aherni Hita Garcia & Fisher, 2012
- Tetramorium aisha Mbanyana et al., 2018
- Tetramorium akengense (Wheeler, 1922)
- Tetramorium akermani Arnold, 1926
- Tetramorium ala Hita Garcia & Fisher, 2012
- Tetramorium albenae Salata et al., 2023
- Tetramorium alii Akbar et al., 2023
- Tetramorium alperti Hita Garcia & Fisher, 2014
- Tetramorium alpestre Steiner et al., 2010
- Tetramorium alternans Santschi, 1929
- Tetramorium altivagans Santschi, 1914
- Tetramorium amalae Sharaf & Aldawood, 2012
- Tetramorium amatongae Bolton, 1980
- Tetramorium amaurum Bolton, 1980
- Tetramorium ambanizana Hita Garcia & Fisher, 2012
- Tetramorium ambatovy Hita Garcia & Fisher, 2012
- Tetramorium amentete Bolton, 1980
- Tetramorium amissum Bolton, 1980=
- Tetramorium anatolicum Csősz & Schulz, 2007
- Tetramorium andohahela Hita Garcia & Fisher, 2012
- Tetramorium andrei Forel, 1892
- Tetramorium andrynicum Bolton, 1977
- Tetramorium angulinode Santschi, 1910
- Tetramorium ankarana Hita Garcia & Fisher, 2012
- Tetramorium annectens Pisarski, 1969
- Tetramorium anodontion Bolton, 1979
- Tetramorium antennatum (Mann, 1919)
- Tetramorium antipodum Wheeler, 1927
- Tetramorium antrema (Bolton, 1976)
- Tetramorium anxium Santschi, 1914
- Tetramorium aptum Bolton, 1977
- Tetramorium argenteopilosum Arnold, 1926
- Tetramorium argentirubrum Dietrich, 2004
- Tetramorium armatum Santschi, 1927
- Tetramorium arnoldi (Forel, 1913)
- Tetramorium artemis Hita Garcia & Fisher, 2012
- Tetramorium arzi Thome, 1969
- Tetramorium asetyum Bolton, 1980
- Tetramorium aspersum (Smith, 1865)
- Tetramorium aspina Wagner et al., 2018
- Tetramorium aspis Hita Garcia & Fisher, 2014
- Tetramorium ataxium Bolton, 1980
- Tetramorium atlante Cagniant, 1970
- Tetramorium atratulum (Schenck, 1852)
- Tetramorium avaratra Hita Garcia & Fisher, 2012
- Tetramorium avium Bolton, 1980
- Tetramorium azcatltontlium Marques et al., 2011
- Tetramorium barbigerum Bolton, 1980
- Tetramorium barryi Mathew, 1981
- Tetramorium basum Bolton, 1977
- Tetramorium baufra (Bolton, 1976)
- Tetramorium beesoni (Mukerjee, 1934)
- Tetramorium belgaense Forel, 1902
- Tetramorium bellerophoni Salata & Borowiec, 2017
- Tetramorium bellicosum Bolton, 1980
- Tetramorium bendai Hita Garcia et al., 2010
- Tetramorium bequaerti Forel, 1913
- Tetramorium berbiculum Bolton, 1980
- Tetramorium bessonii Forel, 1891
- Tetramorium bevisi Arnold, 1958
- Tetramorium bicarinatum (Nylander, 1846)
- Tetramorium bicolor Viehmeyer, 1914
- Tetramorium bicolorum Vásquez-Bolaños, 2007
- Tetramorium binghami Akbar et al., 2023
- Tetramorium biskrense Forel, 1904
- Tetramorium boehmei Hita Garcia et al., 2010
- Tetramorium boltoni Hita Garcia et al., 2010
- Tetramorium bonibony Hita Garcia & Fisher, 2012
- Tetramorium bothae Forel, 1910
- Tetramorium bressleri Hita Garcia & Fisher, 2014
- Tetramorium brevicorne Bondroit, 1918
- Tetramorium brevidentatum (Kutter, 1932)
- Tetramorium breviscapus Wagner et al., 2017
- Tetramorium brevispinosum (Stitz, 1910)
- Tetramorium brigitteae Mbanyana et al., 2018
- Tetramorium browni Bolton, 1980
- Tetramorium bulawayense Forel, 1913
- Tetramorium buschingeri (Lapeva-Gjonova, 2017)
- Tetramorium buthrum Bolton, 1980
- Tetramorium caespitum (Linnaeus, 1758)
- Tetramorium caldarium (Roger, 1857)
- Tetramorium calidum Forel, 1907
- Tetramorium calinum Bolton, 1980
- Tetramorium camelliae Hita Garcia & Fisher, 2014
- Tetramorium camerunense Mayr, 1895
- Tetramorium candidum Bolton, 1980
- Tetramorium capense Mayr, 1865
- Tetramorium capillosum Bolton, 1980
- Tetramorium capitale (McAreavey, 1949)
- Tetramorium cardiocarenum Xu & Zheng, 1994
- Tetramorium carinatum (Smith, 1859)
- Tetramorium caritum (Bolton, 1986)
- Tetramorium caucasicum Wagner et al., 2017
- Tetramorium cavernicola Hita Garcia & Fisher, 2015
- Tetramorium centum Bolton, 1977
- Tetramorium chapmani Bolton, 1977
- Tetramorium chefketi Forel, 1911
- Tetramorium chepocha (Bolton, 1976)
- Tetramorium chloe (Santschi, 1920)
- Tetramorium christiei Forel, 1902
- Tetramorium ciliatum Bolton, 1977
- Tetramorium clunum Forel, 1913
- Tetramorium cognatum Bolton, 1979
- Tetramorium coillum Bolton, 1979
- Tetramorium coloreum Mayr, 1901
- Tetramorium concaviceps Bursakov, 1984
- Tetramorium confusum Bolton, 1977
- Tetramorium constanciae Arnold, 1917
- Tetramorium convexum Bolton, 1980
- Tetramorium coonoorense Forel, 1902
- Tetramorium cordatum Sheela & Narendran, 1998
- Tetramorium crepum Wang & Wu, 1988
- Tetramorium cristatum Stitz, 1910
- Tetramorium critchleyi (Bolton, 1976)
- Tetramorium crypticum (Bolton, 1976)
- Tetramorium cuneinode Bolton, 1977
- Tetramorium curtulum Emery, 1895
- Tetramorium curvispinosum Mayr, 1897
- Tetramorium cyclolobium Xu & Zheng, 1994
- Tetramorium cynicum Bolton, 1977
- Tetramorium dalek Hita Garcia & Fisher, 2014
- Tetramorium davidi Forel, 1911
- Tetramorium decamerum (Forel, 1902)
- Tetramorium decem Forel, 1913
- Tetramorium deceptum Bolton, 1977
- Tetramorium dedefra (Bolton, 1976)
- Tetramorium degener Santschi, 1911
- Tetramorium delagoense Forel, 1894
- Tetramorium densopilosum Radchenko & Arakelian, 1990
- Tetramorium depressiceps Menozzi, 1933
- Tetramorium depressum Forel, 1892
- Tetramorium desertorum (Forel, 1910)
- Tetramorium dichroum Santschi, 1932
- Tetramorium difficile Bolton, 1977
- Tetramorium diligens (Smith, 1865)
- Tetramorium diomandei Bolton, 1980
- Tetramorium diomedeum Emery, 1908
- Tetramorium distinctum (Bolton, 1976)
- Tetramorium do Forel, 1914
- Tetramorium dogieli Karavaiev, 1931
- Tetramorium dolichosum Bolton, 1980
- Tetramorium dominum Bolton, 1980
- Tetramorium doriae Emery, 1881
- Tetramorium drunex Fisher, 2025
- Tetramorium dumezi Menozzi, 1942
- Tetramorium duncani Mbanyana et al., 2018
- Tetramorium dunhuangense Chang & He, 2001
- Tetramorium dysalum Bolton, 1979
- Tetramorium dysderke Bolton, 1980
- Tetramorium edouardi Forel, 1894
- Tetramorium eleates Forel, 1913
- Tetramorium electrum Bolton, 1979
- Tetramorium elf Hita Garcia & Fisher, 2012
- Tetramorium elidisum Bolton, 1980
- Tetramorium elisabethae Forel, 1904
- Tetramorium emeryi Mayr, 1901
- Tetramorium eminii (Forel, 1894)
- Tetramorium enkidu Hita Garcia & Fisher, 2014
- Tetramorium epimyrmoide Báthori et al., 2024
- Tetramorium erectum Emery, 1895
- Tetramorium ericae Arnold, 1917
- Tetramorium etiolatum Bolton, 1977
- Tetramorium exasperatum Emery, 1891
- Tetramorium exile Csősz & Radchenko, 2007
- Tetramorium fenix Fisher, 2025
- Tetramorium fergusoni Forel, 1902
- Tetramorium ferox Ruzsky, 1903
- Tetramorium feroxoides Dlussky & Zabelin, 1985
- Tetramorium fezzanense Bernard, 1948
- Tetramorium flabellum Bolton, 1980
- Tetramorium flagellatum Bolton, 1977
- Tetramorium flaviceps Arnold, 1960
- Tetramorium flavidulum Santschi, 1910
- Tetramorium flavipes Emery, 1893
- Tetramorium flavithorax (Santschi, 1914)
- Tetramorium flavocostatum Salata et al., 2024
- Tetramorium flinex Fisher, 2025
- Tetramorium forte Forel, 1904
- Tetramorium frenchi Forel, 1914
- Tetramorium freya Hita Garcia & Fisher, 2014
- Tetramorium frigidum Arnold, 1926
- Tetramorium fulviceps (Emery, 1897)
- Tetramorium furtivum (Arnold, 1956)
- Tetramorium fusciclavum Consani & Zangheri, 1952
- Tetramorium fuscipes (Viehmeyer, 1925)
- Tetramorium gabonense (Andre, 1892)
- Tetramorium galaticum Menozzi, 1936
- Tetramorium galoasanum Santschi, 1910
- Tetramorium gambogecum (Donisthorpe, 1941)
- Tetramorium gazense Arnold, 1958
- Tetramorium gegaimi Forel, 1916
- Tetramorium geminatum Bolton, 1980
- Tetramorium gestroi (Menozzi, 1933)
- Tetramorium ghindanum Forel, 1910
- Tetramorium gilgamesh Hita Garcia & Fisher, 2014
- Tetramorium glabratum Stitz, 1923
- Tetramorium gladius Hita Garcia & Fisher, 2014
- Tetramorium gladstonei Forel, 1913
- Tetramorium globulinode (Mayr, 1901)
- Tetramorium gollum Hita Garcia & Fisher, 2014
- Tetramorium goniommoide Poldi, 1979
- Tetramorium gracile Forel, 1894
- Tetramorium grandinode Santschi, 1913
- Tetramorium granulatum Bolton, 1980
- Tetramorium grassii Emery, 1895
- Tetramorium guangxiense Zhou & Zheng, 1997
- Tetramorium guineense (Bernard, 1953)
- Tetramorium hapale Bolton, 1980
- Tetramorium hasinae Yamane & Jaitrong, 2011
- Tetramorium hecate Hita Garcia & Fisher, 2013
- Tetramorium hector Hita Garcia & Fisher, 2012
- Tetramorium hippocrate Agosti & Collingwood, 1987
- Tetramorium hirsutum Collingwood & van Harten, 2005
- Tetramorium hispidum (Wheeler, 1915)
- Tetramorium hitagarciai Akbar et al., 2023
- Tetramorium hobbit Hita Garcia & Fisher, 2014
- Tetramorium hortorum Arnold, 1958
- Tetramorium humbloti Forel, 1891
- Tetramorium hungaricum Röszler, 1935
- Tetramorium ibycterum Bolton, 1979
- Tetramorium ictidum Bolton, 1980
- Tetramorium imbelle (Emery, 1915)
- Tetramorium immigrans Santschi, 1927
- Tetramorium impressum (Viehmeyer, 1925)
- Tetramorium impurum (Foerster, 1850)
- Tetramorium incruentatum Arnold, 1926
- Tetramorium indicum Forel, 1913
- Tetramorium indocile Santschi, 1927
- Tetramorium indosinense Wheeler, 1927
- Tetramorium inerme Mayr, 1877
- Tetramorium inezulae (Forel, 1914)
- Tetramorium infraspinosum Karavaiev, 1935
- Tetramorium infraspinum Forel, 1905
- Tetramorium inglebyi Forel, 1902
- Tetramorium inquilinum Ward et al., 2015
- Tetramorium insolens (Smith, 1861)
- Tetramorium intextum Santschi, 1914
- Tetramorium intonsum Bolton, 1980
- Tetramorium invictum Bolton, 1980
- Tetramorium isectum Bolton, 1979
- Tetramorium isipingense Forel, 1914
- Tetramorium isoelectrum Hita Garcia & Fisher, 2012
- Tetramorium jarawa Agavekar et al., 2017
- Tetramorium jauresi Forel, 1914
- Tetramorium jedi Hita Garcia & Fisher, 2012
- Tetramorium jejunum Arnold, 1926
- Tetramorium jizani Collingwood, 1985
- Tetramorium jordani Santschi, 1937
- Tetramorium juba Collingwood, 1985
- Tetramorium judas Wheeler & Mann, 1916
- Tetramorium jugatum Bolton, 1980
- Tetramorium kabulistanicum Pisarski, 1967
- Tetramorium kakamega Hita Garcia et al., 2010
- Tetramorium kali Hita Garcia & Fisher, 2012
- Tetramorium karthala Hita Garcia & Fisher, 2014
- Tetramorium katypum (Bolton, 1976)
- Tetramorium kelleri Forel, 1887
- Tetramorium kephalosi Salata & Borowiec, 2017
- Tetramorium keralense Sheela & Narendran, 1998
- Tetramorium kestrum Bolton, 1980
- Tetramorium kheperra (Bolton, 1976)
- Tetramorium khnum Bolton, 1977
- Tetramorium khyarum Bolton, 1980
- Tetramorium kieti Roncin, 2002
- Tetramorium kisilkumense Dlussky, 1990
- Tetramorium kraepelini Forel, 1905
- Tetramorium krishnani Agavekar et al., 2017
- Tetramorium krynitum Bolton, 1980
- †Tetramorium kulickae Radchenko & Dlussky, 2015
- Tetramorium kydelphon Bolton, 1979
- Tetramorium laevithorax Emery, 1895
- Tetramorium lanuginosum Mayr, 1870
- Tetramorium laparum Bolton, 1977
- Tetramorium laticephalum Bolton, 1977
- Tetramorium latinode Collingwood & Agosti, 1996
- Tetramorium latreillei Forel, 1895
- Tetramorium legone Bolton, 1980
- Tetramorium lerouxi Mbanyana et al., 2018
- Tetramorium lobulicorne Santschi, 1916
- Tetramorium longicorne Forel, 1907
- Tetramorium longoi Forel, 1915
- Tetramorium lucayanum Wheeler, 1905
- Tetramorium lucidulum Menozzi, 1933
- Tetramorium lucyae Sorger, 2011
- Tetramorium luteipes Santschi, 1910
- Tetramorium luteolum Arnold, 1926
- Tetramorium mackae Hita Garcia & Fisher, 2012
- Tetramorium magnificum Bolton, 1980
- Tetramorium mahafaly Hita Garcia & Fisher, 2011
- Tetramorium mai Wang, 1993
- Tetramorium malabarense Sheela & Narendran, 1998
- Tetramorium malagasy Hita Garcia & Fisher, 2012
- Tetramorium mallenseana Hita Garcia & Fisher, 2012
- Tetramorium manni Bolton, 1985
- Tetramorium manobo (Calilung, 2000)
- Tetramorium marginatum Forel, 1895
- Tetramorium margueriteae Mbanyana et al., 2018
- Tetramorium marojejy Hita Garcia & Fisher, 2012
- Tetramorium mars Hita Garcia & Fisher, 2014
- Tetramorium matopoense Arnold, 1926
- Tetramorium maurum Santschi, 1918
- Tetramorium mayri (Mann, 1919)
- Tetramorium megalops Bolton, 1977
- Tetramorium meghalayense Bharti, 2011
- Tetramorium melanogyna Mann, 1919
- Tetramorium melleum Emery, 1897
- Tetramorium menkaura (Bolton, 1976)
- Tetramorium meressei Forel, 1916
- Tetramorium meridionale Emery, 1870
- Tetramorium merina Hita Garcia & Fisher, 2014
- Tetramorium meshena Bolton, 1976
- Tetramorium metactum Bolton, 1980
- Tetramorium mexicanum Bolton, 1979
- Tetramorium microgyna Santschi, 1918
- Tetramorium microps (Mayr, 1901)
- Tetramorium minimum (Bolton, 1976)
- Tetramorium minusculum (Santschi, 1914)
- Tetramorium miserabile Santschi, 1918
- Tetramorium mixtum Forel, 1902
- Tetramorium mkomazi Hita Garcia et al., 2010
- Tetramorium monardi (Santschi, 1937)
- Tetramorium monticola Hita Garcia & Fisher, 2014
- Tetramorium moravicum Kratochvíl, 1941
- Tetramorium mossamedense Forel, 1901
- Tetramorium mpala Hita Garcia & Fischer, 2014
- Tetramorium muralti Forel, 1910
- Tetramorium muscorum Arnold, 1926
- Tetramorium mutatum Bolton, 1985
- Tetramorium myops Bolton, 1977
- Tetramorium myrmidon Hita Garcia & Fisher, 2014
- Tetramorium nacta (Bolton, 1976)
- Tetramorium naganum Bolton, 1979
- Tetramorium nama Hawkes, 2020
- Tetramorium nassonowii Forel, 1892
- Tetramorium nautarum Santschi, 1918
- Tetramorium navum Bolton, 1977
- Tetramorium nazgul Hita Garcia & Fisher, 2012
- Tetramorium nefassitense Forel, 1910
- Tetramorium nify Hita Garcia & Fisher, 2012
- Tetramorium nigrum Forel, 1907
- Tetramorium nipponense Wheeler, 1928
- Tetramorium nitidissimum Pisarski, 1967
- Tetramorium nodiferum (Emery, 1901)
- Tetramorium noeli Hita Garcia & Fisher, 2012
- Tetramorium noratum Bolton, 1977
- Tetramorium norvigi Hita Garcia & Fisher, 2012
- Tetramorium nosybe Hita Garcia & Fisher, 2012
- Tetramorium notiale Bolton, 1980
- Tetramorium notomelanum Vásquez-Bolaños et al., 2011
- Tetramorium nube Weber, 1943
- Tetramorium nursei Bingham, 1903
- Tetramorium obesum Andre, 1887
- Tetramorium obiwan Hita Garcia & Fisher, 2014
- Tetramorium obtusidens Viehmeyer, 1916
- Tetramorium occidentale (Santschi, 1916)
- Tetramorium ochrothorax Chang & He, 2001
- Tetramorium ocothrum Bolton, 1979
- Tetramorium oculatum Forel, 1913
- Tetramorium olana Hita Garcia & Fisher, 2012
- Tetramorium opacum (Emery, 1909)
- Tetramorium orc Hita Garcia & Fisher, 2012
- Tetramorium orientale Forel, 1895
- Tetramorium ornatum Emery, 1897
- Tetramorium osiris (Bolton, 1976)
- Tetramorium pacificum Mayr, 1870
- Tetramorium palaense Bolton, 1979
- †Tetramorium paraarmatum Radchenko & Dlussky, 2015
- Tetramorium parasiticum Bolton, 1980
- Tetramorium parvispinum (Emery, 1893)
- Tetramorium parvum Bolton, 1977
- Tetramorium pauper Forel, 1907
- Tetramorium pelagium Poldi, 1995
- Tetramorium peringueyi Arnold, 1926
- Tetramorium perlongum Santschi, 1923
- Tetramorium persignatum Bolton, 1995
- Tetramorium petersi Forel, 1910
- Tetramorium petiolatum Sheela & Narendran, 1998
- Tetramorium peutli Forel, 1916
- Tetramorium phasias Forel, 1914
- Tetramorium philippwagneri Hita Garcia et al., 2010
- Tetramorium pialtum Bolton, 1980
- Tetramorium pilosum Emery, 1893
- Tetramorium pinnipilum Bolton, 1980
- Tetramorium pisarskii Radchenko & Scupola, 2015
- Tetramorium placidum Bolton, 1979
- Tetramorium platynode Bolton, 1980
- Tetramorium pleganon Bolton, 1979
- Tetramorium plesiarum Bolton, 1979
- Tetramorium plumosum Bolton, 1980
- Tetramorium pnyxis Bolton, 1976
- Tetramorium pogonion Bolton, 1980
- Tetramorium politum Emery, 1897
- Tetramorium polymorphum Yamane & Jaitrong, 2011
- Tetramorium popell Hita Garcia & Fisher, 2012
- Tetramorium postpetiolatum Santschi, 1919
- Tetramorium poweri Forel, 1914
- Tetramorium praetextum Bolton, 1980
- Tetramorium proximum Bolton, 1979
- Tetramorium pseudogladius Hita Garcia & Fisher, 2014
- Tetramorium psymanum Bolton, 1980
- Tetramorium pulchellum Emery, 1897
- Tetramorium pulcherrimum (Donisthorpe, 1945)
- Tetramorium pullulum Santschi, 1924
- Tetramorium punctatum Santschi, 1927
- Tetramorium punctiventre Emery, 1887
- Tetramorium punicum (Smith, 1861)
- Tetramorium pusillum Emery, 1895
- Tetramorium pylacum Bolton, 1980
- Tetramorium pyrenaeicum Roeszler, 1937
- Tetramorium quadridentatum Stitz, 1910
- Tetramorium qualarum Bolton, 1980
- Tetramorium quasirum Bolton, 1979
- Tetramorium rala Hita Garcia & Fisher, 2014
- Tetramorium ranarum Forel, 1895
- Tetramorium raptor Hita Garcia, 2014
- Tetramorium rawlinsoni (Taylor, 1992)
- Tetramorium regulare Bolton, 1980
- Tetramorium rekhefe Bolton, 1979
- Tetramorium renae Hita Garcia et al., 2010
- Tetramorium repentinum Arnold, 1926
- Tetramorium repletum Wang & Xiao, 1988
- Tetramorium reptana Bolton, 1976
- Tetramorium reticuligerum Bursakov, 1984
- Tetramorium rhetidum Bolton, 1980
- Tetramorium rhodium Emery, 1924
- Tetramorium rigidum Bolton, 1977
- Tetramorium rimytyum Bolton, 1980
- Tetramorium rinatum Bolton, 1977
- Tetramorium robertsoni Hita Garcia et al., 2010
- Tetramorium robitika Hita Garcia & Fisher, 2012
- Tetramorium rogatum Bolton, 1980
- Tetramorium rossi (Bolton, 1976)
- Tetramorium rothschildi (Forel, 1907)
- Tetramorium rotundatum (Santschi, 1924)
- Tetramorium rubrum Hita Garcia et al., 2010
- Tetramorium rufescens (Stitz, 1923)
- Tetramorium rugigaster Bolton, 1977
- Tetramorium rumo Hita Garcia & Fisher, 2014
- Tetramorium ryanphelanae Hita Garcia & Fisher, 2012
- Tetramorium sabatinellii Radchenko & Scupola, 2015
- Tetramorium sabatra Hita Garcia & Fisher, 2012
- Tetramorium sada Hita Garcia & Fisher, 2012
- Tetramorium saginatum Bolton, 1980
- Tetramorium sahlbergi Finzi, 1936
- Tetramorium salomo Mann, 1919
- Tetramorium salvatum Forel, 1902
- Tetramorium salwae Mohamed et al., 2001
- Tetramorium sanetrai Schulz & Csősz, 2007
- Tetramorium sargina Hita Garcia & Fisher, 2012
- Tetramorium saudiae (Collingwood & Agosti, 1996)
- Tetramorium saudicum Sharaf, 2013
- Tetramorium scabrosum (Smith, 1859)
- Tetramorium scabrum Mayr, 1879
- Tetramorium schaufussii Forel, 1891
- Tetramorium schmidti Forel, 1904
- Tetramorium schmitzi (Forel, 1910)
- Tetramorium schneideri Emery, 1898
- Tetramorium schoutedeni Santschi, 1924
- Tetramorium schultzei Forel, 1910
- Tetramorium sculptatum Bolton, 1977
- Tetramorium scutum Hita Garcia & Fisher, 2014
- Tetramorium scytalum Bolton, 1979
- Tetramorium securis Roncin, 2002
- Tetramorium seiferti (Kiran & Karaman, 2017)
- Tetramorium semilaeve Andre, 1883
- Tetramorium semireticulatum Arnold, 1917
- Tetramorium seneb Bolton, 1977
- Tetramorium sentosum Sheela & Narendran, 1998
- Tetramorium sepositum Santschi, 1918
- Tetramorium sepultum Bolton, 1980
- Tetramorium sericeiventre Emery, 1877
- Tetramorium sericeum Arnold, 1926
- Tetramorium setigerum Mayr, 1901
- Tetramorium setuliferum Emery, 1895
- Tetramorium severini (Emery, 1895)
- Tetramorium shamshir Hita Garcia & Fisher, 2012
- Tetramorium shensiense Bolton, 1977
- Tetramorium shilohense Forel, 1913
- Tetramorium shirlae Sharaf, 2007
- Tetramorium shivalikense Bharti & Kumar, 2012
- Tetramorium sibiricum Seifert, 2021
- Tetramorium sigillum Bolton, 1980
- Tetramorium signatum Emery, 1895
- Tetramorium sikorae Forel, 1892
- Tetramorium silvicola Hita Garcia & Fisher, 2012
- Tetramorium simillimum (Smith, 1851)
- Tetramorium simulator Arnold, 1917
- Tetramorium sinensis Zhang et al., 2025
- Tetramorium singletonae Hita Garcia & Fisher, 2012
- Tetramorium sitefrum Bolton, 1980
- Tetramorium sjostedti Forel, 1915
- Tetramorium smaug Hita Garcia & Fisher, 2012
- Tetramorium smithi Mayr, 1879
- Tetramorium snellingi Hita Garcia et al., 2010
- Tetramorium solidum Emery, 1886
- Tetramorium solomonense Ward et al., 2015
- Tetramorium somniculosum Arnold, 1926
- Tetramorium spininode Bolton, 1977
- Tetramorium spinosum (Pergande, 1896)
- Tetramorium splendens Ruzsky, 1902
- Tetramorium splendidior (Viehmeyer, 1925)
- Tetramorium squaminode Santschi, 1911
- Tetramorium staerckei Kratochvíl, 1944
- Tetramorium steinheili Forel, 1892
- Tetramorium striabdomen Chang & He, 2001
- Tetramorium striativentre Mayr, 1877
- Tetramorium strictum Bolton, 1977
- Tetramorium striolatum Viehmeyer, 1914
- Tetramorium subcoecum Forel, 1907
- Tetramorium sudanense (Weber, 1943)
- Tetramorium sulcinode Santschi, 1927
- Tetramorium surrogatum Bolton, 1985
- Tetramorium susannae Hita Garcia et al., 2010
- Tetramorium syriacum Emery, 1922
- Tetramorium tabarum Bolton, 1980
- Tetramorium talpa (Bolton, 1976)
- Tetramorium tanaense Hita Garcia et al., 2010
- Tetramorium tanakai Bolton, 1977
- Tetramorium tantillum Bolton, 1979
- Tetramorium taueret Bolton, 1995
- Tetramorium taylori Bolton, 1985
- Tetramorium tenebrosum Arnold, 1926
- Tetramorium tenuicrine (Emery, 1914)
- Tetramorium tenuinode Hita Garcia & Fisher, 2014
- Tetramorium termitobium Emery, 1908
- Tetramorium thalidum Bolton, 1977
- Tetramorium thoth (Bolton, 1976)
- Tetramorium titus Forel, 1910
- Tetramorium tonganum Mayr, 1870
- Tetramorium tortuosum Roger, 1863
- Tetramorium tosii Emery, 1899
- Tetramorium traegaordhi Santschi, 1914
- Tetramorium trafo Hita Garcia & Fisher, 2012
- Tetramorium transformans Santschi, 1914
- Tetramorium transversarium Roger, 1863
- Tetramorium transversinode (Mayr, 1901)
- Tetramorium triangulatum Bharti & Kumar, 2012
- Tetramorium tricarinatum Viehmeyer, 1914
- Tetramorium trimeni (Emery, 1895)
- Tetramorium trirugosum Hita Garcia et al., 2010
- Tetramorium tsingy Hita Garcia & Fisher, 2012
- Tetramorium tsushimae Emery, 1925
- Tetramorium turneri Forel, 1902
- Tetramorium tychadion Bolton, 1980
- Tetramorium tylinum Bolton, 1977
- Tetramorium typhlops Bolton, 1980
- Tetramorium tyrion Hita Garcia & Fisher, 2012
- Tetramorium ubangense Santschi, 1937
- Tetramorium uelense Santschi, 1923
- Tetramorium ultor Forel, 1913
- Tetramorium umtaliense Arnold, 1926
- Tetramorium undatium Chang & He, 2001
- Tetramorium unicum Bolton, 1980
- Tetramorium urbanii Bolton, 1977
- Tetramorium validiusculum Emery, 1897
- Tetramorium valky Hita Garcia & Fisher, 2012
- Tetramorium vandalum Bolton, 1977
- Tetramorium venator Hita Garcia & Fisher, 2014
- Tetramorium vernicosum Radchenko, 1992
- Tetramorium versiculum Bolton, 1980
- Tetramorium vertigum Bolton, 1977
- Tetramorium vexator Arnold, 1926
- Tetramorium viehmeyeri Forel, 1907
- Tetramorium viticola Weber, 1943
- Tetramorium voasary Hita Garcia & Fisher, 2012
- Tetramorium vohitra Hita Garcia & Fisher, 2012
- Tetramorium vombis (Bolton, 1976)
- Tetramorium vony Hita Garcia & Fisher, 2012
- Tetramorium wadje Bolton, 1980
- Tetramorium wagneri Viehmeyer, 1914
- Tetramorium walshi (Forel, 1890)
- Tetramorium wardi Hita Garcia & Fisher, 2012
- Tetramorium warreni Arnold, 1926
- Tetramorium weitzeckeri Emery, 1895
- Tetramorium wroughtonii (Forel, 1902)
- Tetramorium xanthogaster Santschi, 1911
- Tetramorium xuthum Bolton, 1980
- Tetramorium yammer Hita Garcia & Fisher, 2012
- Tetramorium yarthiellum Bolton, 1976
- Tetramorium yemene Collingwood & Agosti, 1996
- Tetramorium yerburyi Forel, 1902
- Tetramorium youngi Bolton, 1980
- Tetramorium yulongense Xu & Zheng, 1994
- Tetramorium zambezium Santschi, 1939
- Tetramorium zapyrum Bolton, 1980
- Tetramorium zenatum Bolton, 1979
- Tetramorium zonacaciae (Weber, 1943)
- Tetramorium zypidum Bolton, 1977

== Gallery ==
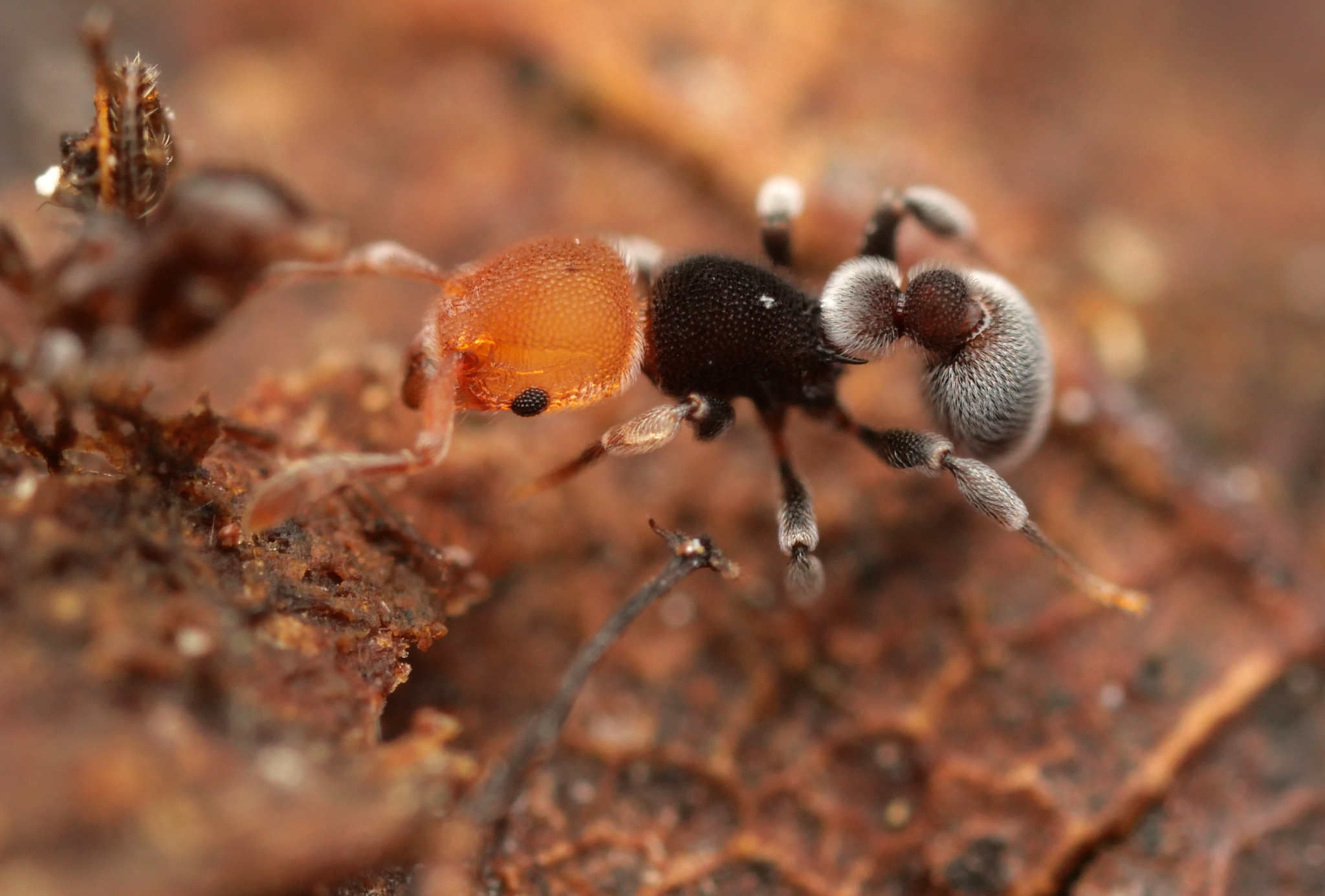
Tetramorium fulviceps

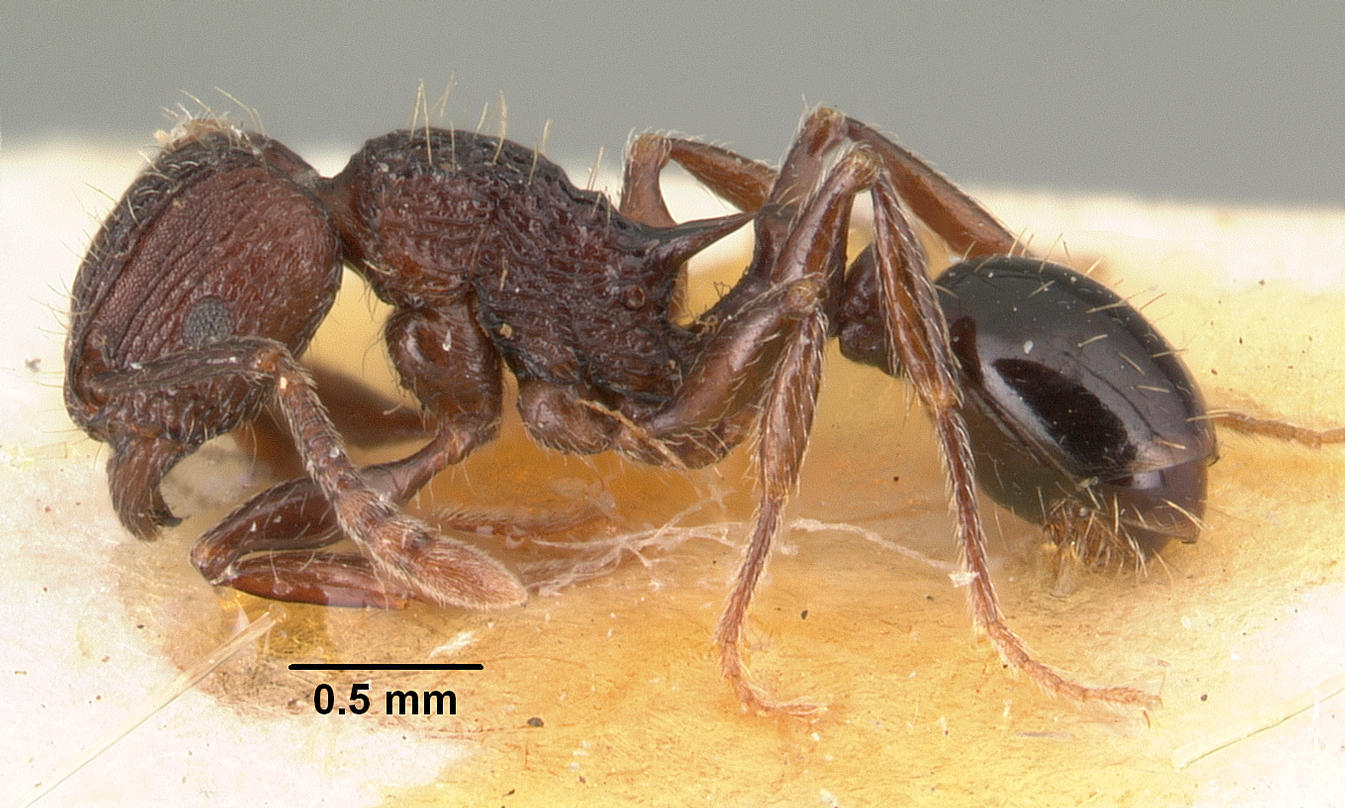
Tetramorium guineense

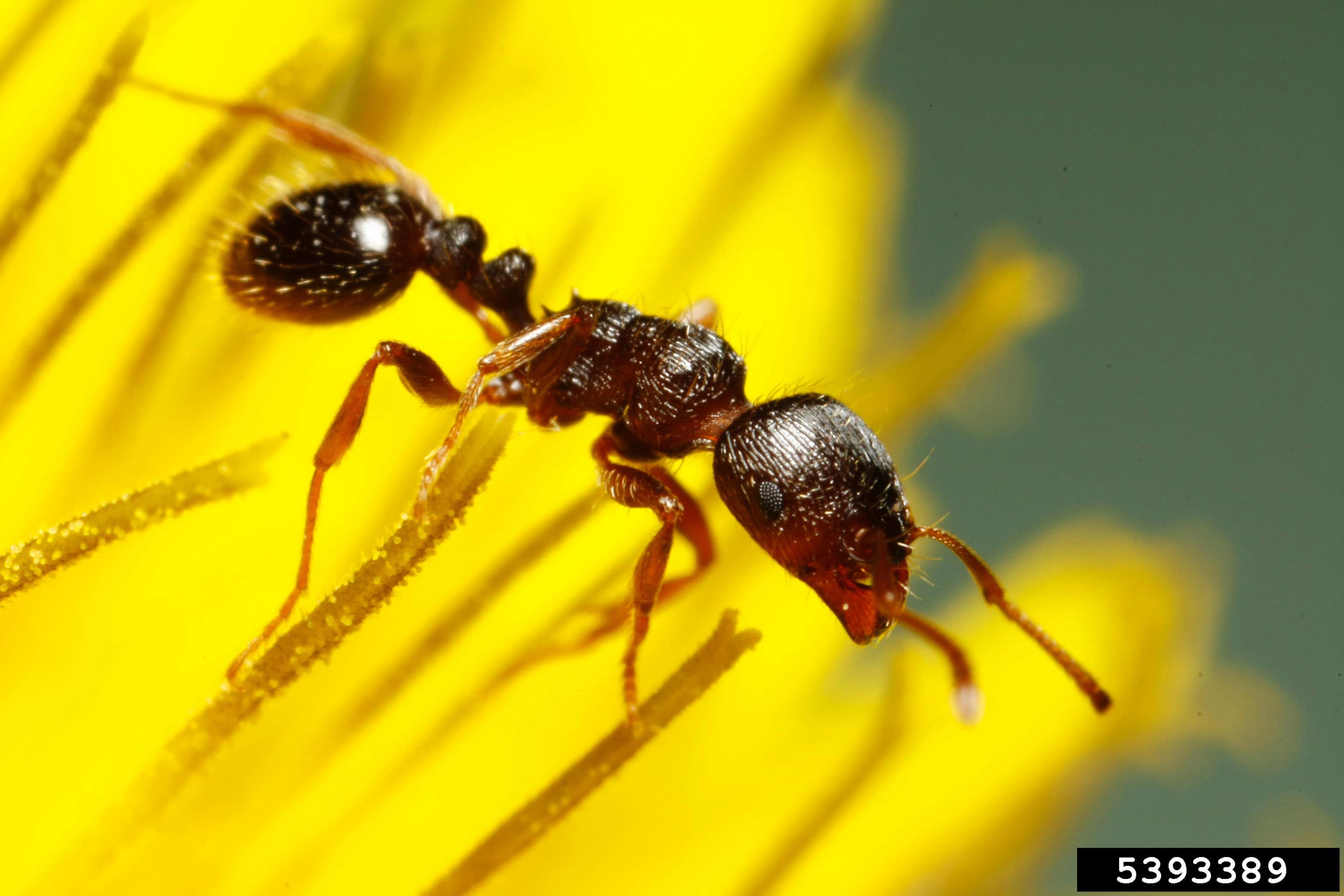
Tetramorium immigrans

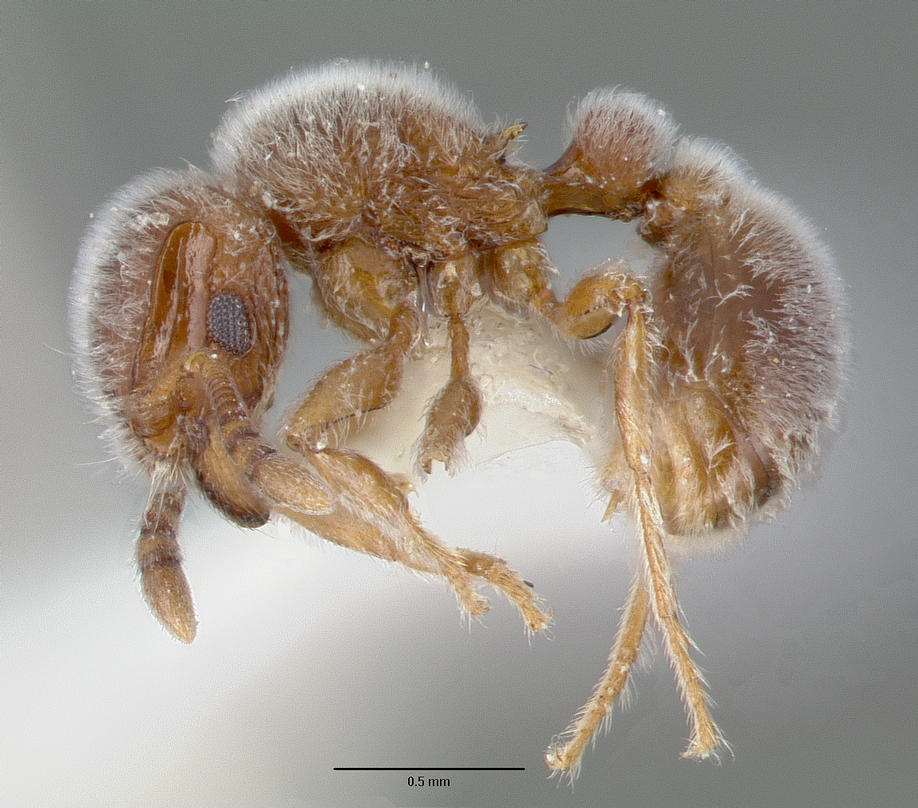
Tetramorium reptana

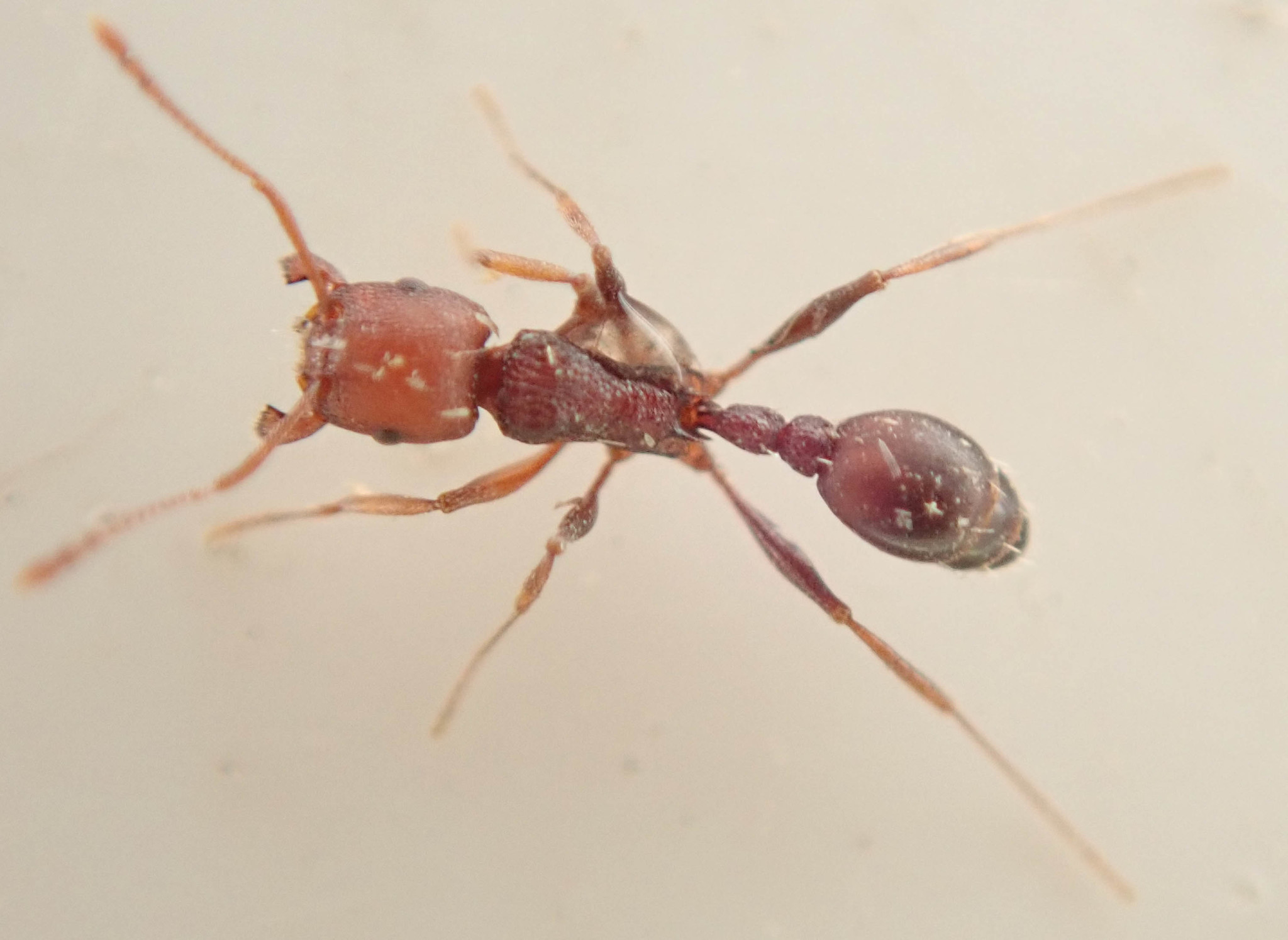
T. sericeiventre
