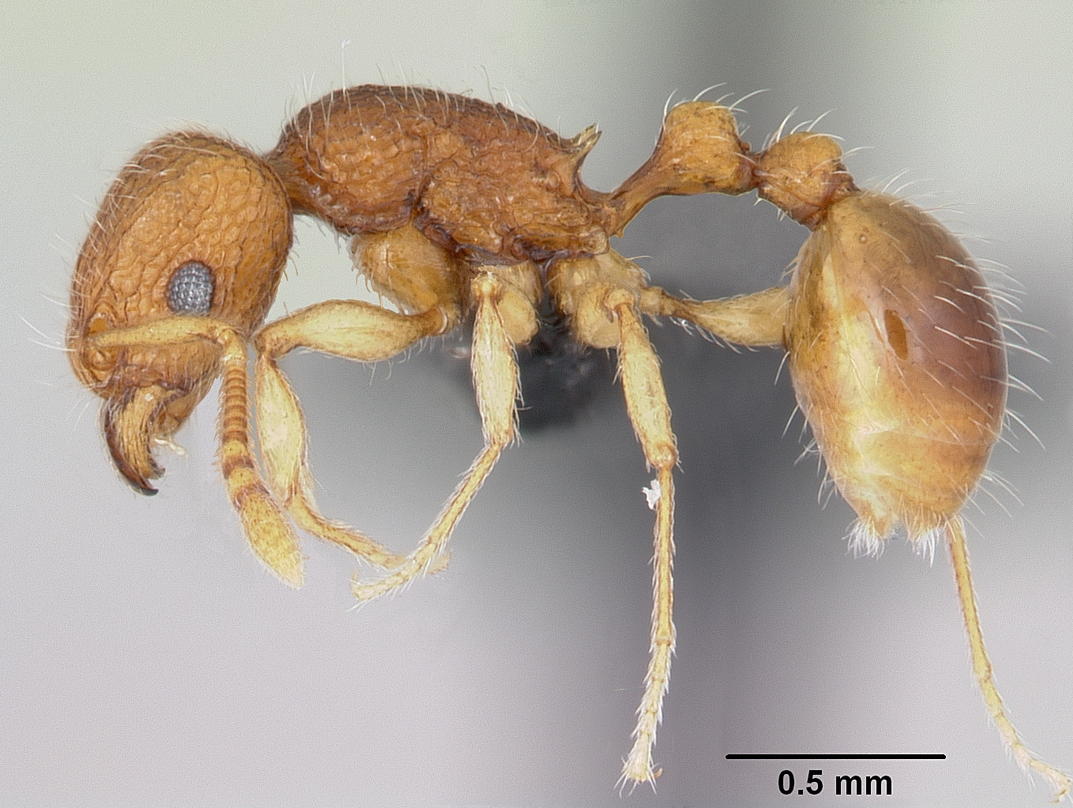

Scientific classification
- Kingdom: Animalia
- Phylum: Arthropoda
- Clade: Pancrustacea
- Class: Insecta
- Order: Hymenoptera
- Family: Formicidae
- Subfamily: Myrmicinae
- Genus: Tetramorium
- Species: T. tonganum

Binomial name
- Tetramorium tonganum Mayr, 1870

Synonyms
- Tetramorium magitae Forel, 1911

= Tetramorium tonganum =

Species of ant

Tetramorium tonganum is a species of ant in the subfamily Myrmicinae. It is found in Australasian, Indo-Australian, Oriental, and Palaearctic regional countries.
