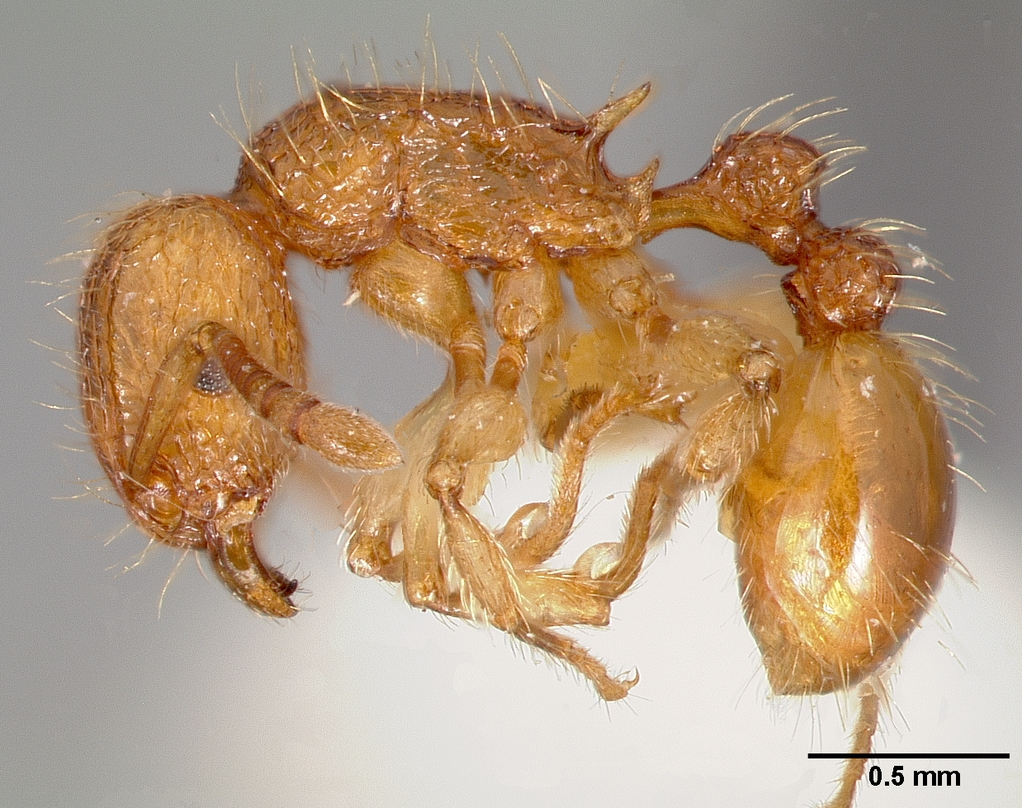
- Tetramorium insolens worker

Scientific classification
- Kingdom: Animalia
- Phylum: Arthropoda
- Clade: Pancrustacea
- Class: Insecta
- Order: Hymenoptera
- Family: Formicidae
- Subfamily: Myrmicinae
- Genus: Tetramorium
- Species: T. insolens

Binomial name
- Tetramorium insolens (Smith, 1861)

= Tetramorium insolens =

Species of ant

Tetramorium insolens is a species of ant in the genus Tetramorium. It is a medium-sized orange ant that is mainly seen on vegetation, has a monomorphic work caste with 12-segmented antennae, three-segmented antennal club, short antennal scapes that do not surpass the posterior margin of the head, a gradually sloped mesosoma, and strong propodeal spines. It has two waist segments and a gaster with a stinger.

The species lives primarily and natively in the Pacific Island region, with an invasive and non-native yet established presence recorded in Austria, Hungary, France, and the Netherlands.
