= Tetramorium microgyna =

Conservation status
- Vulnerable (IUCN 2.3)

Scientific classification
- Kingdom: Animalia
- Phylum: Arthropoda
- Class: Insecta
- Order: Hymenoptera
- Family: Formicidae
- Subfamily: Myrmicinae
- Genus: Tetramorium
- Species: T. microgyna

Binomial name
- Tetramorium microgyna Santschi, 1918

Species of ant

Tetramorium microgyna is a species of ant in the genus Tetramorium. It is found in South Africa and Zimbabwe.
