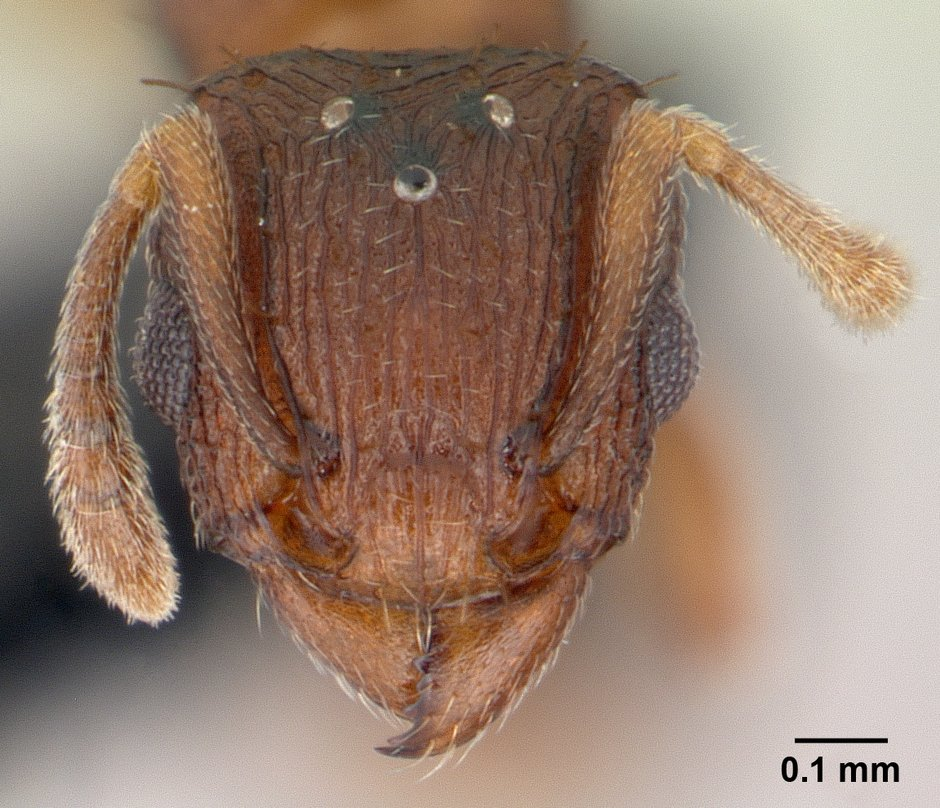

Scientific classification
- Kingdom: Animalia
- Phylum: Arthropoda
- Clade: Pancrustacea
- Class: Insecta
- Order: Hymenoptera
- Family: Formicidae
- Subfamily: Myrmicinae
- Genus: Tetramorium
- Species: T. simillimum

Binomial name
- Tetramorium simillimum (Smith, F., 1851)

Synonyms
- Myrmica parallela Smith, F., 1859; Tetramorium pusillum bantouana Santschi, 1910; Tetramorium pusillum exoleta Santschi, 1914; Tetramorium pygmaeum Emery, 1877; Tetramorium simillimum denticulatum Forel, 1902; Tetramorium simillimum insulare Santschi, 1928; Tetramorium simillimum opacior Forel, 1913; Wasmannia auropunctata brevispinosa Borgmeier, 1928

= Tetramorium simillimum =

Species of ant

Tetramorium simillimum, is a species of ant in the subfamily Myrmicinae. It is a small pale colored widespread species that can be found in almost all the continents.
