= Tetramorium parasiticum =

Conservation status
- Vulnerable (IUCN 2.3)

Scientific classification
- Kingdom: Animalia
- Phylum: Arthropoda
- Class: Insecta
- Order: Hymenoptera
- Family: Formicidae
- Subfamily: Myrmicinae
- Genus: Tetramorium
- Species: T. parasiticum

Binomial name
- Tetramorium parasiticum Bolton, 1980

Species of ant

Tetramorium parasiticum is a species of ant in the genus Tetramorium. It is endemic to South Africa.
