= Tetramorium schmitzi =

Conservation status
- Vulnerable (IUCN 2.3)

Scientific classification
- Kingdom: Animalia
- Phylum: Arthropoda
- Class: Insecta
- Order: Hymenoptera
- Family: Formicidae
- Subfamily: Myrmicinae
- Genus: Tetramorium
- Species: T. schmitzi

Binomial name
- Tetramorium schmitzi (Forel, 1910)

Species of ant

Tetramorium schmitzi is a species of ant in the genus Tetramorium. It is endemic to Israel.
