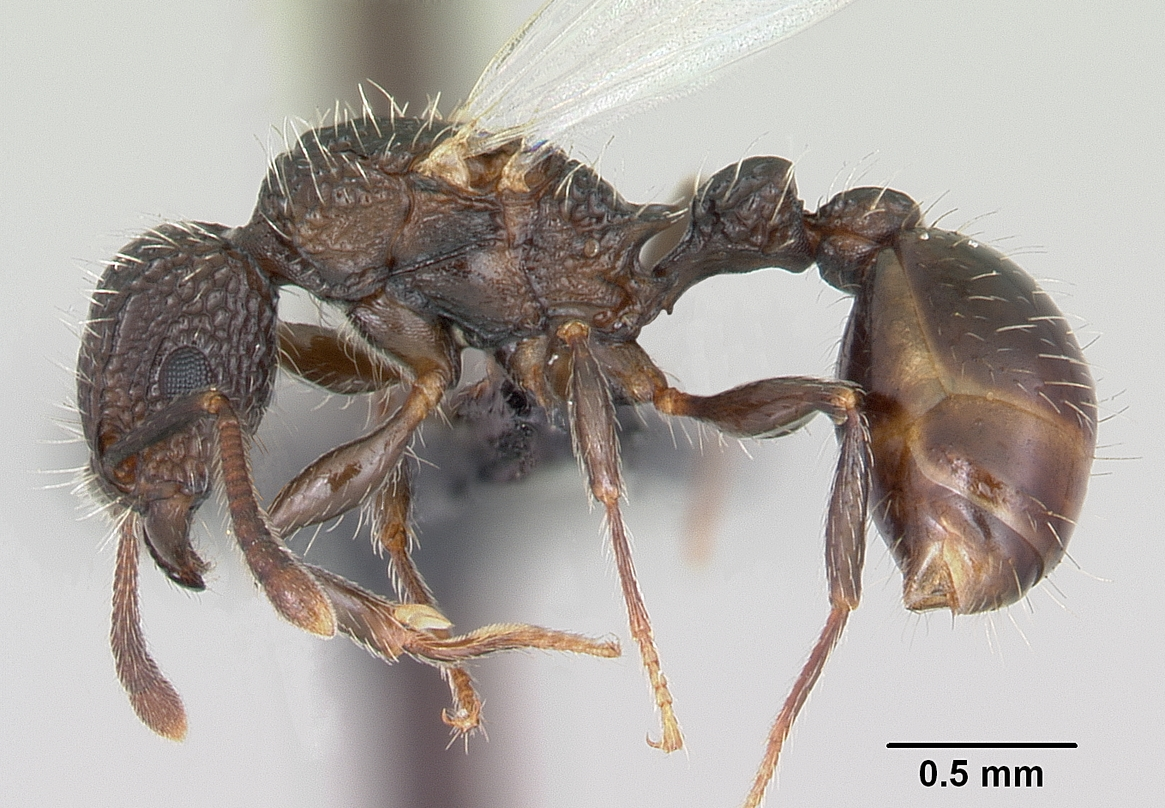

Scientific classification
- Kingdom: Animalia
- Phylum: Arthropoda
- Clade: Pancrustacea
- Class: Insecta
- Order: Hymenoptera
- Family: Formicidae
- Subfamily: Myrmicinae
- Genus: Tetramorium
- Species: T. pacificum

Binomial name
- Tetramorium pacificum Mayr, 1870

Synonyms
- Tetramorium pacificum subscabrum Emery, 1893

= Tetramorium pacificum =

Species of ant

Tetramorium pacificum, is a species of ant in the subfamily Myrmicinae. It is found in many countries.
