= Tetramorium hungaricum =

Scientific classification
- Kingdom: Animalia
- Phylum: Arthropoda
- Clade: Pancrustacea
- Class: Insecta
- Order: Hymenoptera
- Family: Formicidae
- Subfamily: Myrmicinae
- Genus: Tetramorium
- Species: T. hungaricum

Binomial name
- Tetramorium hungaricum Röszler, 1935

Species of ant

Tetramorium hungaricum is a species of ant in the family Formicidae found in Hungary, eastern Austria and Transylvania, Central Europe. It occurs in grasslands of dry, south-exposed limestone or dolomitic slopes, also on sandy grasslands. Colonies tend to contain few to several (rarely up to few hundred) queens.

== Sources ==
- Csősz S, Markó B 2004. Redescription of Tetramorium hungaricum Röszler, 1935, a related species of T. caespitum (Linnaeus, 1758) (Hymenoptera: Formicidae) Myrmecologische Nachrichten 6: 49–59..
