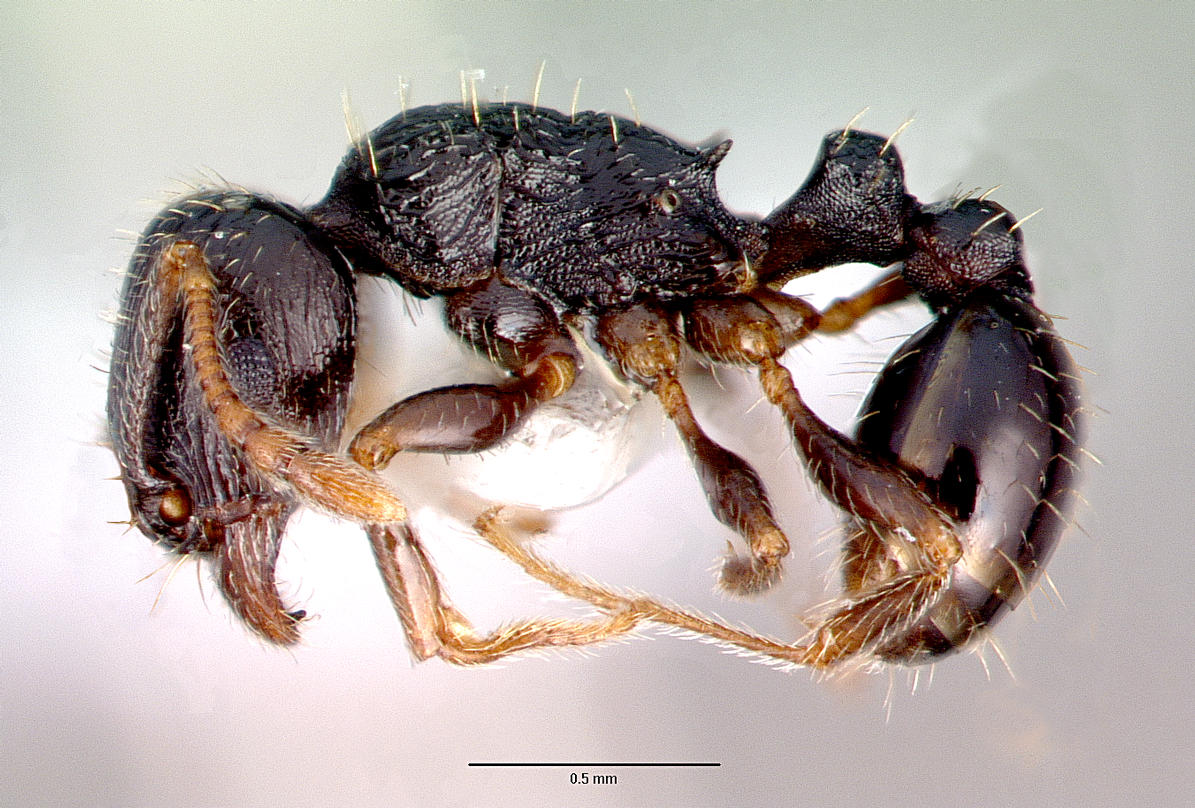
- T. caespitum worker

Scientific classification
- Kingdom: Animalia
- Phylum: Arthropoda
- Clade: Pancrustacea
- Class: Insecta
- Order: Hymenoptera
- Family: Formicidae
- Subfamily: Myrmicinae
- Genus: Tetramorium
- Species: T. caespitum

Binomial name
- Tetramorium caespitum (Linnaeus, 1758)

= Tetramorium caespitum =

Species of Tetramorium ant found in Europe

Tetramorium caespitum, also known as the red pavement ant, is a species of Myrmicine ant native to Europe, Morocco, and western Asia, but now found on many other continents as a tramp species.

== Etymology ==
The species is commonly known as the "pavement ant" because workers are commonly found in pavements or roads, usually searching for food. There are also some Tetramorium species found in North America, although scientists are unsure whether or not T. caespitum is the species found, so they are often called Tetramorium sp..
